= Bavaria statue =

Statue in Munich

Bavaria
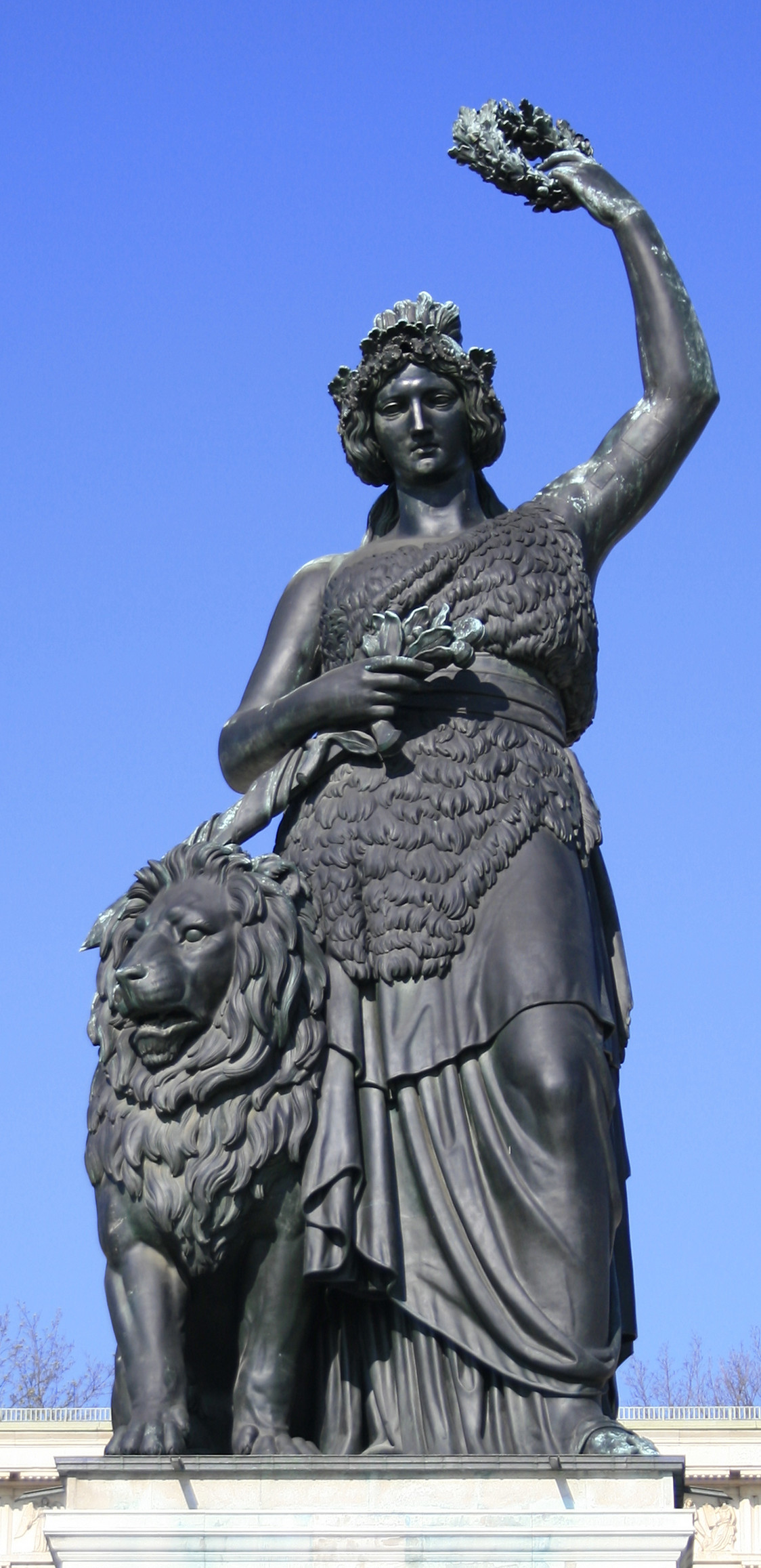
- Bavaria statue and lion after renovation in 2001–2002
- Artist: Ludwig Michael Schwanthaler
- Medium: Bronze
- Subject: Bavaria
- Dimensions: 18.52 m (729 in)
- Weight: 87.36 tons
- Location: Munich; 48°07′50″N 11°32′45″E

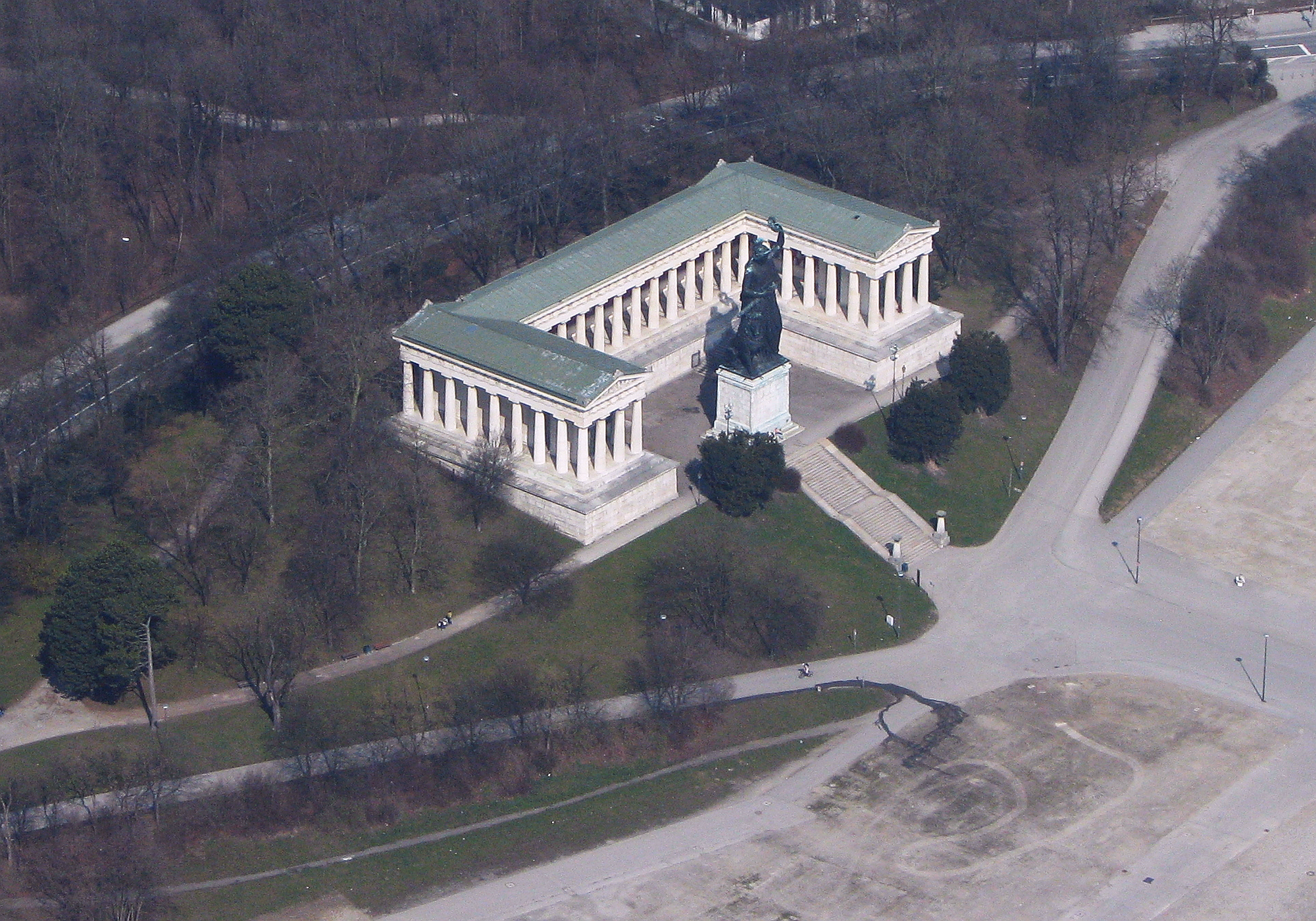
Aerial photograph: Ruhmeshalle and Bavaria monument (2009)

Bavaria is the name given to a monumental, bronze sand-cast 19th-century statue in Munich, southern Germany. It is a female personification of the Bavarian homeland, and by extension its strength and glory.

The statue is part of an ensemble which also includes a hall of fame (Ruhmeshalle) and a stairway. It was commissioned by Ludwig I of Bavaria, with the specific design being chosen by competition. It was cast at the Munich foundry of J.B. Stiglmair between 1844 and 1850 and is the first colossal statue since Classical Antiquity to consist entirely of cast bronze. It was and is up to the present day considered a technological masterpiece. Because of its size it had to be produced in several parts; it is 18.52 metres (60 ft. 9 in.) high and weighs about 87.36 tons. It rests on a stone base which is 8.92 (28 ft.) metres high.

An internal circular staircase leads up to a platform in the head, where four openings in the helmet provide a view of the Theresienwiese and downtown Munich.

== The Hall of Fame ==
Because it forms a logical and artistic unit together with the Bavaria statue, a brief description of the historical background and construction of the Hall of Fame follows.

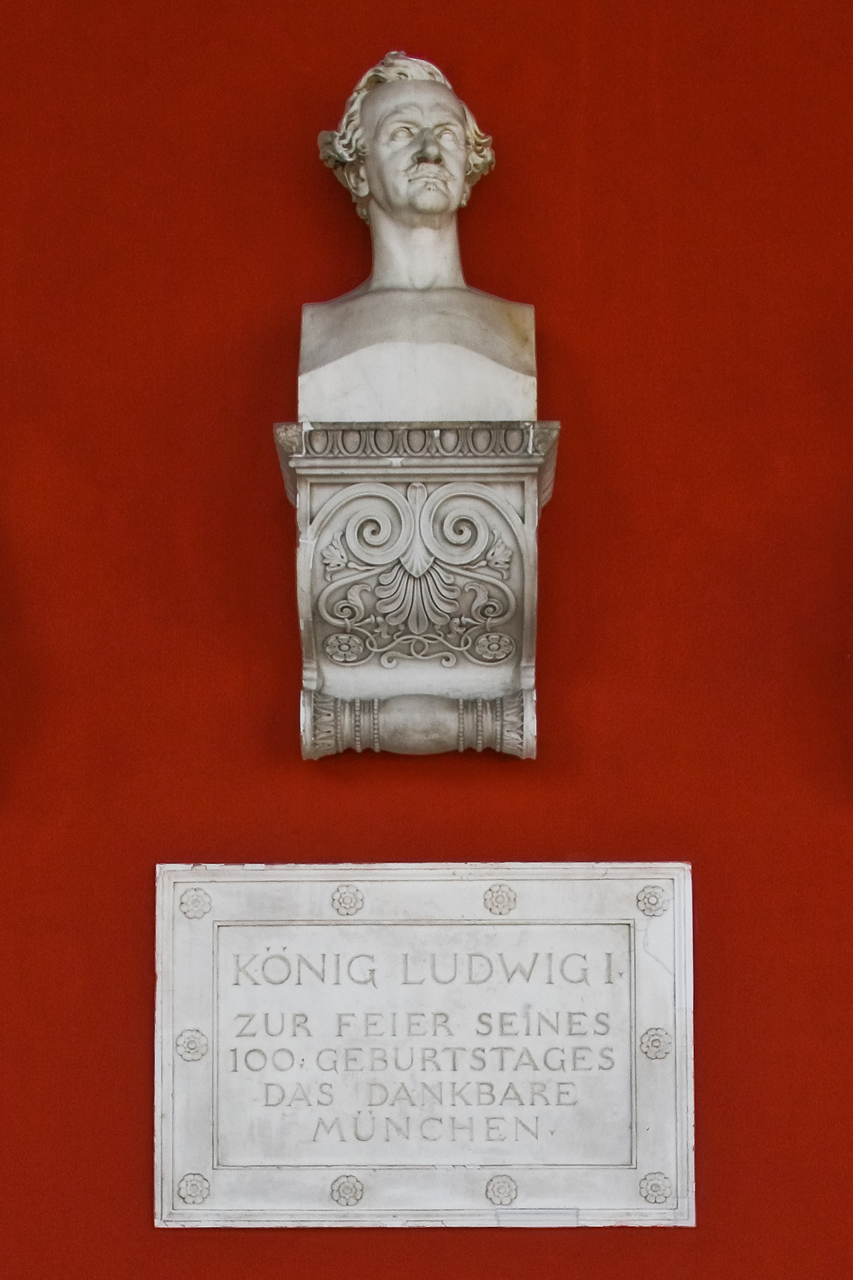
Bust of Ludwig I in the Hall of Fame

=== Historical background ===
The childhood of Ludwig I was marked by the claims to power of Napoleon on the one hand, and Austria on the other. At that time the venerable House of Wittelsbach which he represented had been reduced to a plaything for the ambitions of these two major powers. Up until 1805, when Napoleon “freed” Munich in the War of the Second Coalition and made Ludwig's father, Maximilian, king of Bavaria, that nation had repeatedly been a theater of war and had suffered the disastrous consequences. Only after Napoleon's defeat in the Battle of Leipzig in 1813 did Bavaria enjoy a period of peace.

This history prompted Ludwig already when he was crown prince to think in terms of a “Bavaria comprising all tribes” and of a “great German nation”. These goals motivated him in following years to undertake several projects involving the construction of national monuments like the pillar commemorating the Bavarian constitution of 1818 in Gaibach, the Walhalla temple on an imposing platform overlooking the Danube river and the town of Donaustauf east of Regensburg, the Hall of Fame in Munich (1853) and the Befreiungshalle (“Hall of Liberation”) near Kelheim (1863), all of which were privately financed by the king. In their design and contents, purpose and reception they convey an artistic and political harmony unique in Germany, despite their inner contradictions.

Ludwig, who acceded to the throne upon the death of his father in 1825, felt a spiritual closeness to Greece, was an enthusiastic admirer of Ancient Greece, and wanted to turn his capital city of Munich into an “Athens on the Isar River”. Ludwig's second born son Otto was proclaimed King of Greece in 1832.

=== Construction ===
Already as crown prince Ludwig had the plan to erect a patriotic monument in his royal capital of Munich. He consequently had lists drawn up of “great” Bavarians from all walks of life. In 1833 he launched a competition which was intended to collect preliminary ideas for the design of a hall of fame and thus only specified the project's key features: the hall was to be erected above the Theresienwiese and provide space for about 200 busts. The only requirement was, “... that the building should not duplicate the Walhalla; as many Doric temples as there were, none of them was a copy of the Parthenon ....”

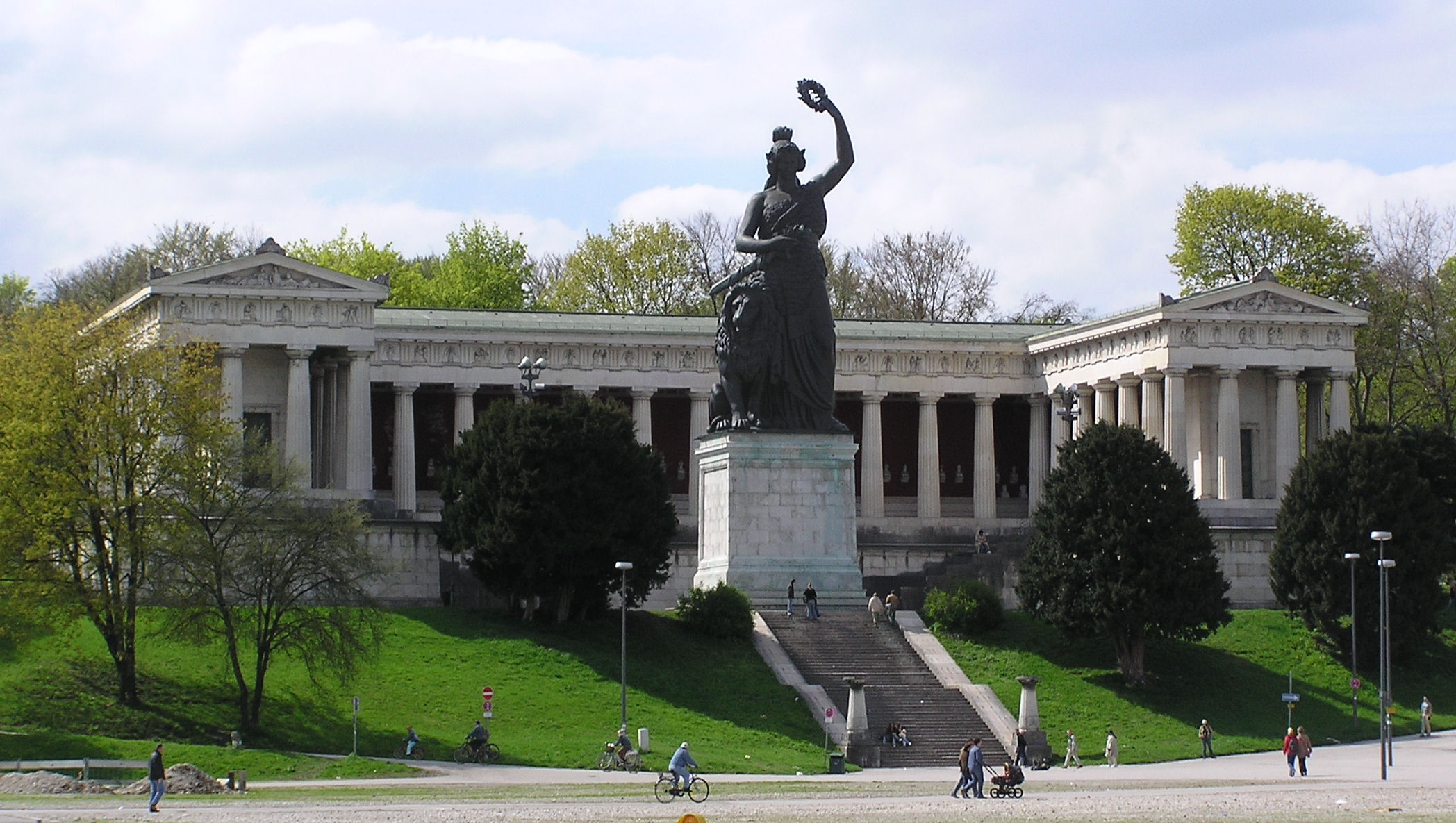
Front view of the ensemble of the Bavaria statue and the Hall of Fame (Ruhmeshalle)

The regulations did not exclude a building in the style of the Classicists as in the Walhalla, a parallel construction project, but it can be assumed that the architects were free to submit other architectural styles. Since the proposals of all four participants have survived to a large extent, they provide an interesting glimpse at the construction history of the Hall of Fame at a time of ideological artistic disputes between the Classicists on the one side, who were inspired by the aesthetics of Antique Greece and Rome, and the Romanticists on the other side, whose artistic manifestations were expressed in Medieval terms. Thus the proposals submitted for the design of the Hall of Fame reflected not only artistic and architectural differences, but these ideological disputes as well. Ludwig finally decided in March 1834, primarily for reasons of expense, against the proposals of Friedrich von Gärtner, Joseph Daniel Ohlmüller and Friedrich Ziebland, and commissioned Leo von Klenze to construct the Hall of Fame. He was undoubtedly influenced by the colossal statue in Klenze's design, since such a huge statue had not been erected since Classical Antiquity. Flattered by the idea of erecting a statue which would be as imposing as those commissioned by the rulers of antiquity, after deciding in favor of Klenze's design Ludwig I wrote, “Only Nero and I can produce such giant statues....”

== History ==
=== Iconography ===
==== Leo von Klenze’s proposals ====
Leo von Klenze, court architect of Bavarian King Ludwig I, first proposed in 1824 a design for the Bavaria statue in the form of a “Greek amazon”, his inspiration being such monumental statues as the Colossus of Rhodes, the Statue of Zeus at Olympia. and especially Phidias’ Athena Parthenos, which survived in numerous small Roman copies.

After the competition to design the Hall of Fame was decided in favor of Klenze, he drew up several proposals for the Bavaria statue in addition to his detailed drawings of the intended Hall.

These sketches show a Bavaria statue influenced by classical representations of an Amazon. She wore a double girdled chiton and high laced sandals. With her right hand she crowned a multiheaded Herma whose four faces symbolize the ideal qualities of a ruler, of a warrior, the arts, and science. In her left hand she held at arm's length at hip level a wreath which she symbolically bestowed on honored personalities. A lion crouched at her left side.

With this suggestion Klenze created a new type of national allegory. For a long time previously there had been personifications of Bavaria, but whereas, for example, the attributes of Tellus Bavarica on the Hofgartentempel represented the material wealth of the nation, Klenze gave his Bavaria attributes of culture and statesmanship. Klenze's design reflected a new understanding of the ideal state as virtuous and enlightened, replacing traditional agrarian symbolism.

In another proposal dating from 1834, Klenze planned the Bavaria statue as an exact copy of the Athena Promachos which once stood in front of the Acropolis. She was provided with a helmet, shield and raised spear.

On May 28, 1837 a contract to produce the Bavaria statue was signed by Ludwig I, Klenze, the sculptor Ludwig Michael Schwanthaler and the metal founder Johann Baptist Stiglmaier and his nephew, Ferdinand von Miller. Ludwig I and the participating artists were certainly aware of the plans for Arminius statues in Teutoburg Forest dating from the 1820s, although these were carried out after the Bavaria statue.

==== Schwanthaler’s proposals ====
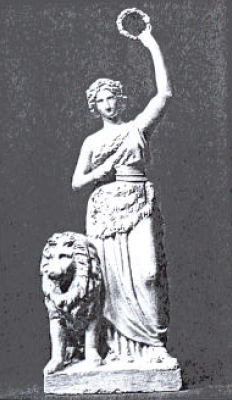
Schwanthaler's plaster model of 1840

In contrast to Klenze, who was influenced by Classical Antiquity, Schwanthaler was a disciple of the Romantic Movement and a member of several Munich medieval circles, all of which were enthusiastic about anything “patriotic” and rejected foreign impulses, especially those from Classical Antiquity. It was apparently part of Ludwig's strategy to combine these contrary artistic conceptions in a single patriotic monument, thereby uniting the opposing camps under one national ideal. His attempt at a synthesis of Classical and Romano-Gothic styles is often referred to in the literature as “Romantic Classicism” or the “Ludovician Style”.

At first Schwanthaler adhered to the specifications of Klenze's plan. But he soon began to come up with his own variations of the Bavaria statue. He made the fundamental decision not to follow Classical models but rather to clothe her in a “Germanic” style: her floor length shirt dress was draped in a simpler way, and bound up together with a bearskin it gave the figure a typical “German” character according to Schwanthaler.

Schwanthaler went a step further in a plaster model dated 1840. He decorated the head with a wreath of entwined oak leaves, and the wreath in the raised left hand, which in the Klenze version was made of laurel leaves, became another oak leaf wreath, the oak being considered an intrinsically German tree. These modifications to the Bavaria statue occurred at the time of the so-called Rhine Crisis of 1840/41, which involved border disputes between France and the German Confederation and led to a surge of patriotic outbursts against the “archenemy” France. For Schwanthaler, who was in any case an enthusiastic patriot, this crisis seems to have been the motivation for portraying his Bavaria statue as emphatically fit to fight and armed with a drawn sword.

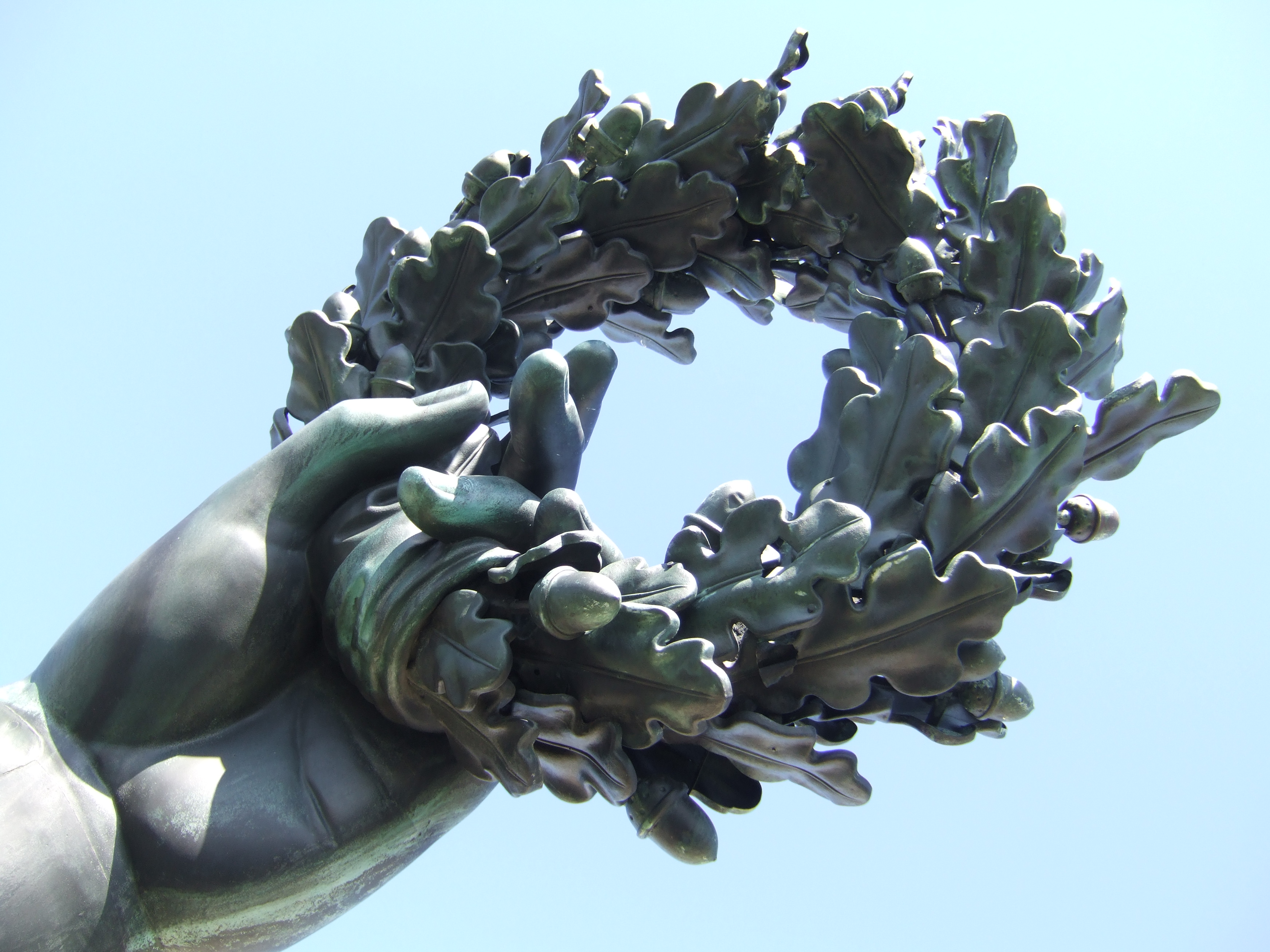
Left hand holding a wreath of oak leaves

The Bavaria statue's attributes of bearskin, oak wreath and sword can be relatively easily interpreted as a consequence of the political and art history context of its genesis, but an interpretation of the lion is more problematic. Although it is natural to regard the animal simply as a symbol of Bavaria, this does not really reflect the intention of Klenze and Schwanthaler. The lion always had a firm place in heraldry for the rulers of Bavaria, as Counts of the Rhine Palatinate the House of Wittelsbach had included it in its coat of arms since the High Middle Ages. In addition, two rampant lions served as supporters in the Bavarian coat of arms from the earliest times.

The art historian Manfred F. Fischer is, however, of the opinion that the lion next to the Bavaria statue is not only conceived as Bavaria's heraldic animal, but along with the drawn sword is meant to be a symbol of defensive potential.

But the most important attribute of the Bavaria statue remains the oak-leaf wreath in her left hand. The wreath signifies an honorary award for those whose busts are to be positioned inside the Hall of Fame.

=== Construction ===
The bronze statue was sand-cast using a process resulting in four major parts (head, bust, hips, lower half with lion) and a number of smaller pieces which were attached later.

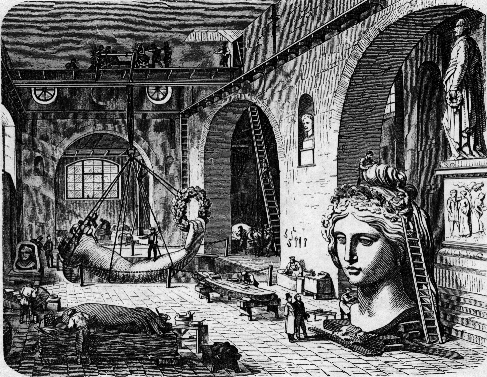
Interior scene of the metal foundry in Munich where the Bavaria statue was produced, showing the head and left arm castings

Klenze proposed that the huge statue be cast in bronze. Ever since Classical Antiquity this alloy had been an esteemed material, valued for its long-lasting qualities, and Ludwig, who wanted to create an enduring legacy, strongly favored bronze. The king therefore supported the Munich metal founder Johann Baptist Stiglmaier and his nephew Ferdinand von Miller and revived the long tradition of bronze casting in Munich by setting up a new foundry, the Royal Metal Foundry (Königliche Erzgießerei), which went into operation on Munich's Nymphenburger Strasse in 1825.

From the end of 1839 on, Schwanthaler and numerous assistants were engaged in producing a full-sized plaster model of the Bavaria statue. In 1844 an initial, four meter high auxiliary model had been completed. In late summer 1843 the finished full-size model could be dismantled in preparation for using the pieces as models for the castings. Stiglmaier died before this work could begin in 1844 and Miller took over leadership of the project. On September 11, 1844 the head of the Bavaria statue was cast using metal from bronze Turkish cannon salvaged from the 1827 naval Battle of Navarino (modern-day Pylos on the west coast of the Peloponnese peninsula). These cannon had been sold in Europe as recycling material under the then Greek King Otto, son of Ludwig I, and a number of them had reached Bavaria. In January and March 1845 the arms were cast and on October 11, 1845 the bust. The hip section was cast the following year and in July 1848 the entire upper portion of the statue was finished. The last major casting, for the lower section, took place on December 1, 1849.

On March 20, 1848 Ludwig I was forced to abdicate the throne in favor of his son Maximilian, which had consequences for the continuation of the monument project since the Bavaria statue and the Hall of Honor, as with all of Ludwig's national monuments, were carried out and financed privately. Although Maximilian obligated himself to continue the project, only 9,000 guilders per year were allocated for it in his budget, which was completely inadequate. Miller, who had advanced the costs for the casting from his own resources, got into serious financial difficulties. Only when Ludwig agreed to privately finance the completion of the Bavaria statue could it be finished. In all, the Hall of Fame cost the king 614,000 guilders, the Bavaria statue 286,346 guilders and the property on which they stood 13,784 guilders. Miller was never recompensed for part of the costs, but the beneficial advertising effects for the foundry turned out to be so great that his expenses could be more than recovered from the many orders the company subsequently received, and the later privatized foundry remained in business until up into the 1930s. Over one hundred other major bronze works of art located worldwide were produced in this foundry, including Klenze's obelisk on Munich's Karolinenplatz, Bertel Thorvaldsen’s statue of Friedrich Schiller on Stuttgart’s Schillerplatz, and Christian Daniel Rauch’s statue of Maximilian I of Bavaria in front of the National Theater in Munich.

=== Assembly and dedication in 1850 ===
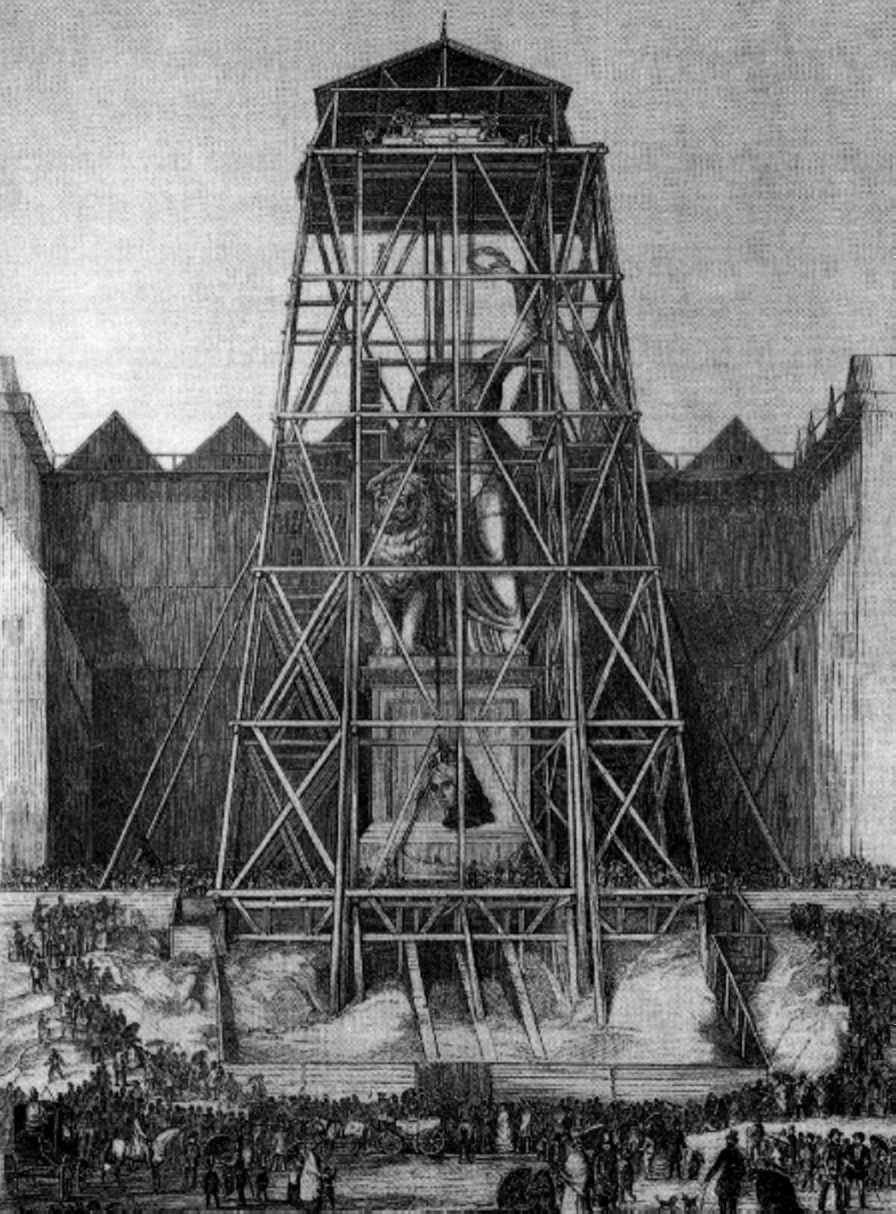
Final assembly of the statue in 1850

The formal unveiling of the Bavaria statue was originally planned for the Oktoberfest in 1850, which would have been the 25th year of Ludwig’s reign. Before any celebrations were held featuring a king who had meanwhile abdicated, government concerns first had to be dispelled that such an event could be interpreted as a demonstration against the ruling monarch, Maximilian II.

Between June and August the separate pieces of the Bavaria statue were transported to the place of installation on especially constructed wagons, each drawn by 20 horses. On August 7, 1850 the last piece, the head, was escorted to the Theresienhöhe in a festive procession through Munich. The official unveiling took place on October 9 after a procession including all involved trades and guilds and, as expected, turned into a tribute for the king who had abdicated. The artists whom the king had greatly supported in the years of his reign and provided with commissions thanks to his extensive construction program paid special homage to Ludwig. After the unveiling of the Bavaria statue, the speaker for the occasion expressed on behalf of the Munich art world, “the gratitude and praise of the present time and times to come—Bavaria’s bronze oak leaf wreath belongs especially to King Ludwig, patron of the arts” (translation)

The Hall of Fame had not been completed at the time of the Bavaria statue unveiling; scaffolding and wooden roofing obscured large portions of the building. Only in 1853 could it be dedicated as part of a far more modest celebration.

== The Bavaria ensemble during the Drittem Reich ==
The Nazis had an ambivalent and cynical relationship to the Hall of Fame and the Bavaria statue. On the one hand, the various plans they developed to redesign the fairgrounds on the Theresienwiese including the Bavaria and the Hall of Fame betrayed a total lack of respect for the location and the intention of their founders. For example, in 1934 they considered demolishing the Hall of Fame behind the Bavaria statue to make space for exhibition grounds, and the Theresienwiese was to be fragmented by avenues for large parades. In 1935 another plan was presented to eliminate the Bavaria statue as well, and in its place to erect a huge congress hall with a memorial for heroes. According to plans from 1938, the Bavaria and Hall of Fame were to be retained, but framed by enormous monumental buildings. The Theresienwiese was to be modified.

On the other hand, the open space of the Theresienwiese and the existing imposing and symbolic architecture were readily used for propagandistic staging, for example for the mass events connected with the pompous May Day celebrations which took place until the outbreak of World War II, as is evident in accounts written by the tightly controlled press.

== Renovation ==
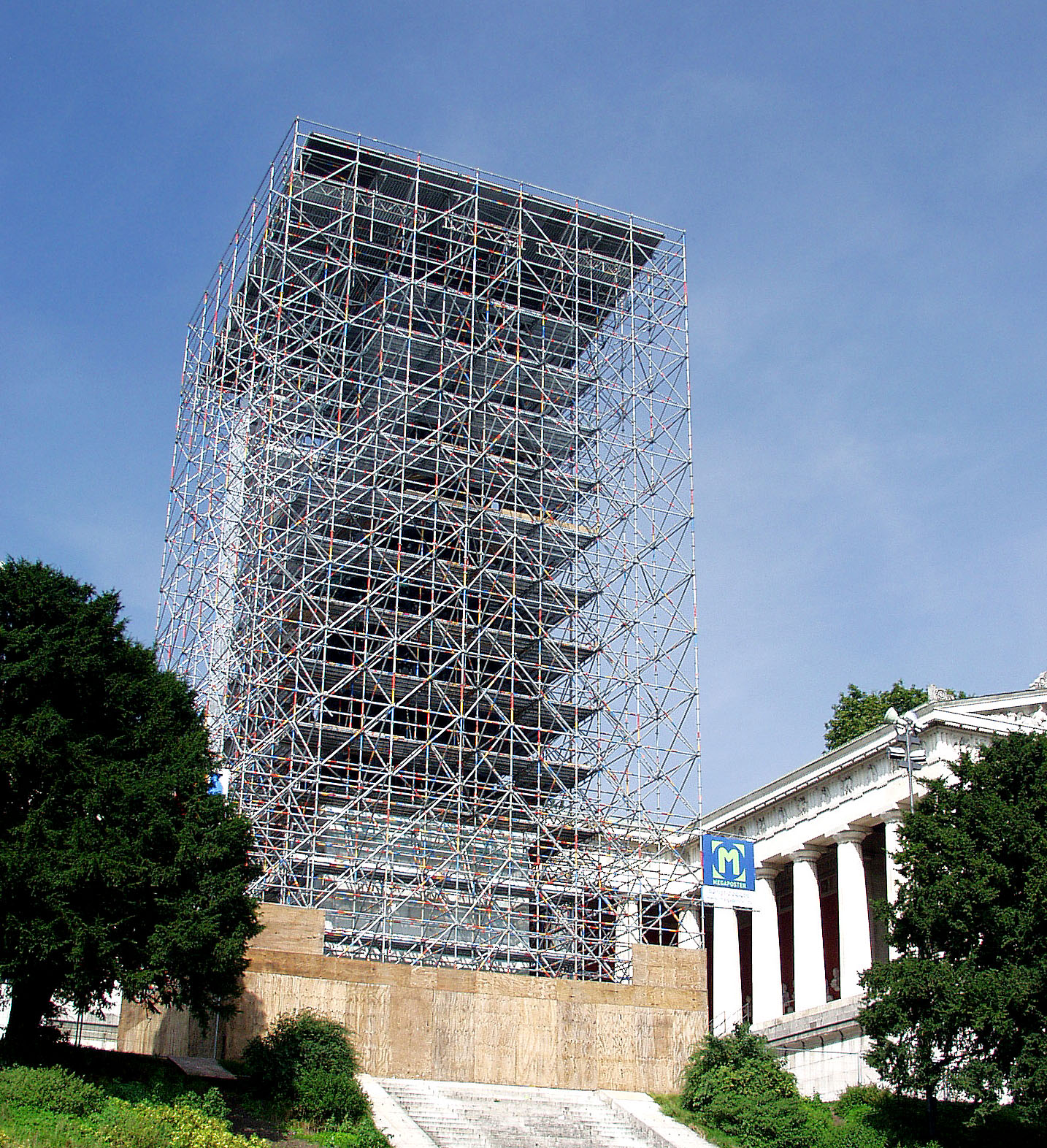
The scaffolded Bavaria statue during renovation, August 2002

An investigation of the Bavaria statue by experts revealed such serious damage that the statue had to be closed to visitors in 2001. In all, over 30 separate flaws were detected.

In the course of the renovation work which was immediately initiated and cost some one million euros, the raised arm was stabilized and the entire outside surface was cleaned, polished and sealed. A completely new inner circular stairway was built.

In order to help finance the renovation work, replicas in various scales were made based on the one model which had been produced by Schwanthaler, the tip of the small finger, including one that could be used as a drinking vessel, as well as other objects of craftsmanship, all of which, as well as a publication, were sold. Work on the statue continued until the beginning of the Oktoberfest in September 2002.

During the entire period of repair, the statue was hidden under a scaffold, whose outside surfaces were made available for advertising. The base of the statue was not renovated at the time and continues to be in need of repair.

== Subsequent casts ==
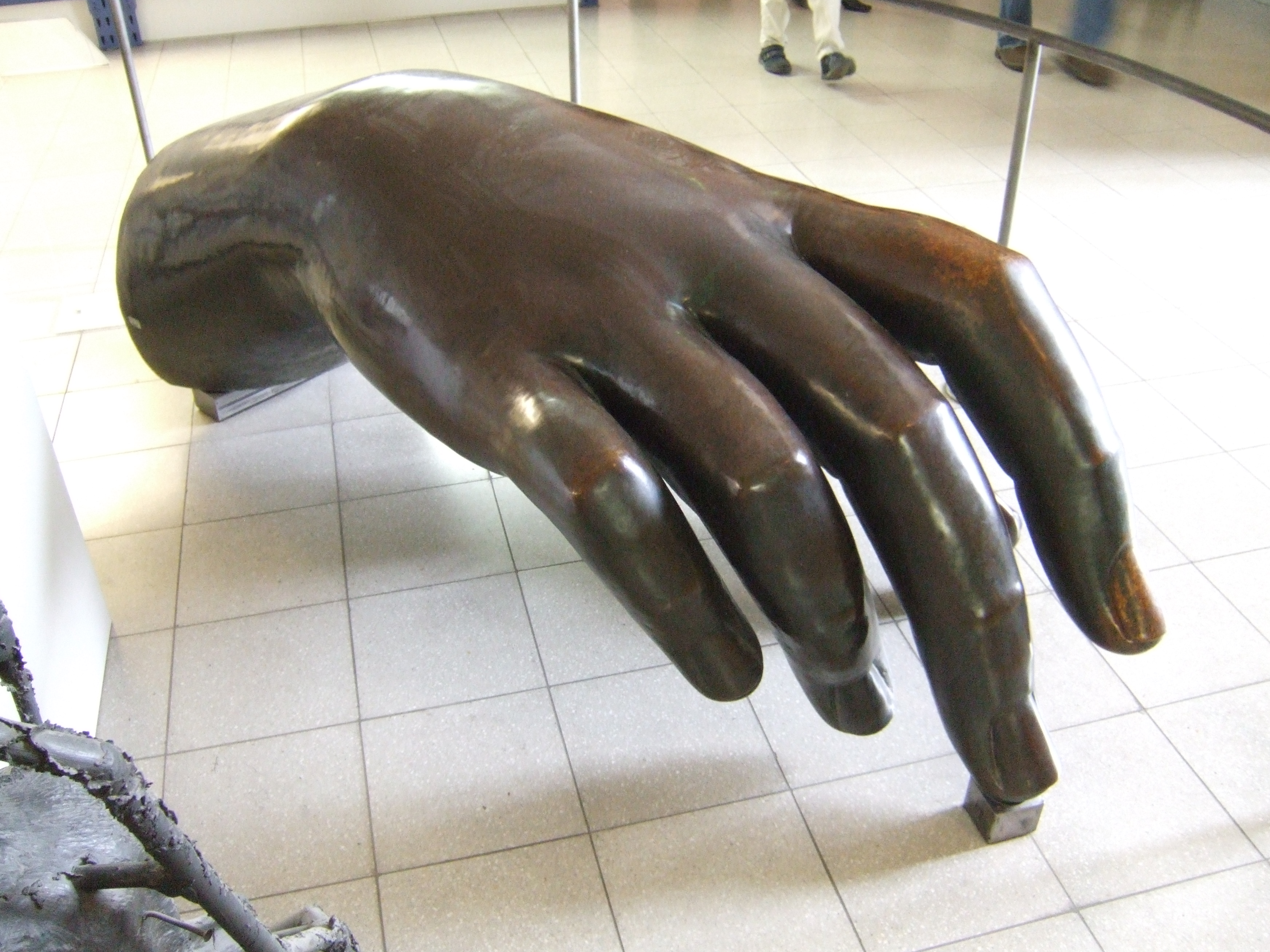
Recast of the right hand, in the Deutsches Museum

In 1907, Oskar von Miller, son of Ferdinand von Millers and founder of the Deutsches Museum in Munich, arranged to have a full-size casting made of the right hand of the Bavaria statue.

It was produced at the Royal Metal Foundry Ferdinand von Miller, consists of the same material as the original (92% copper, 5% zinc, 2% tin, 1% lead), has a wall thickness of 4–8 millimeters, and weighs 420 kilograms.

This copy has been on display ever since in the metallurgy collection of the Deutsches Museum.

== Additional views ==
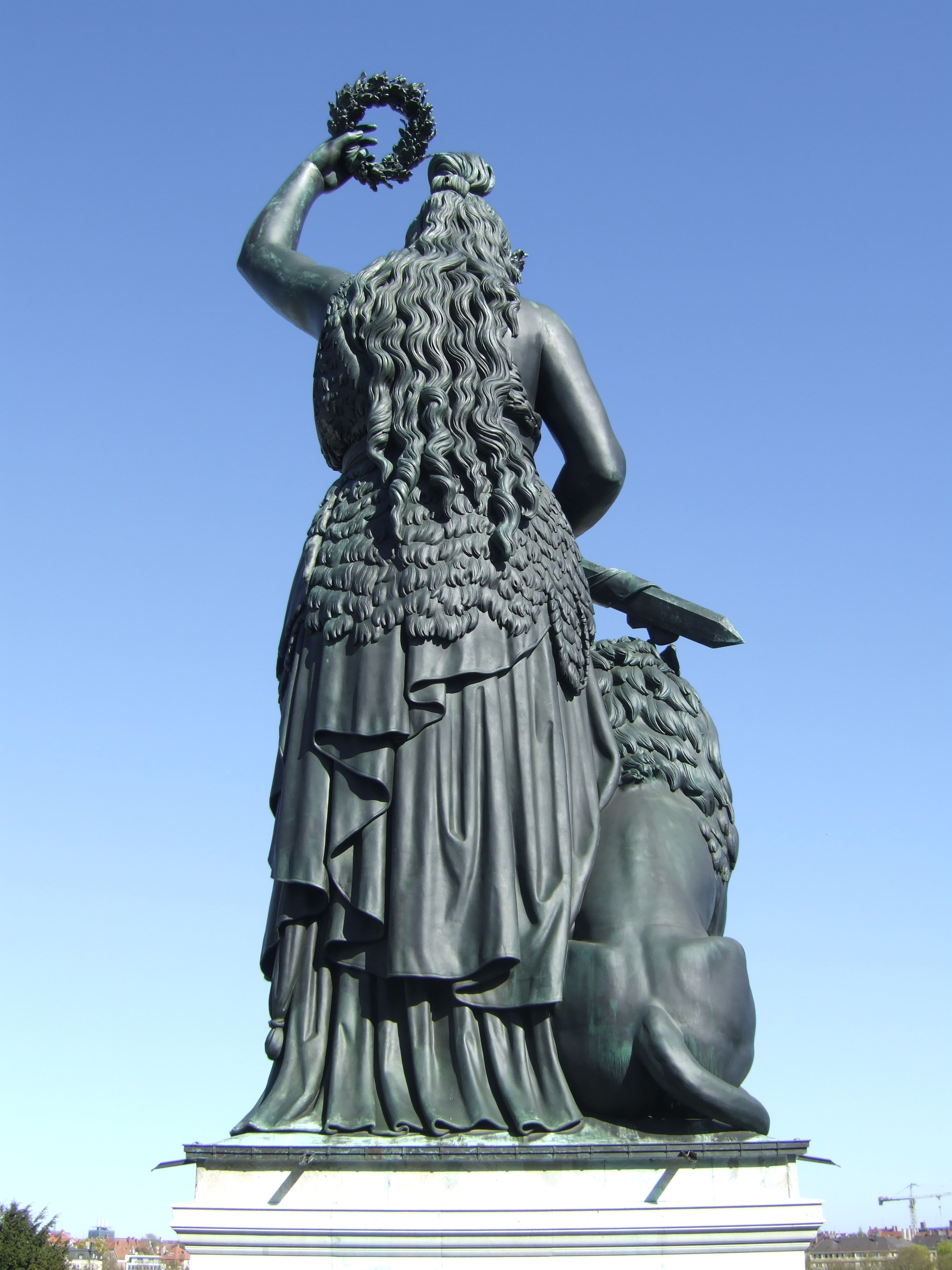
Rear view

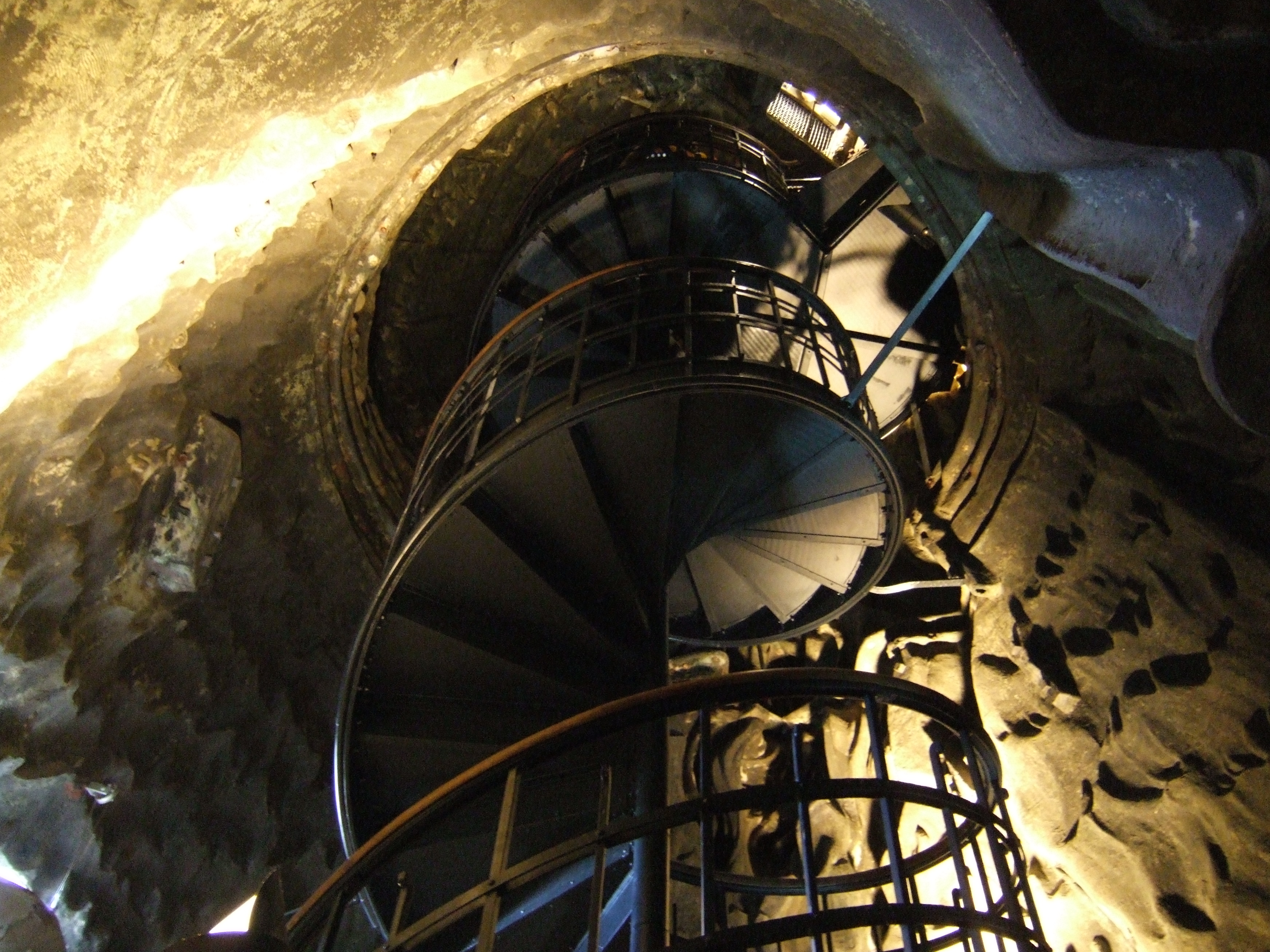
Spiral staircase inside the statue

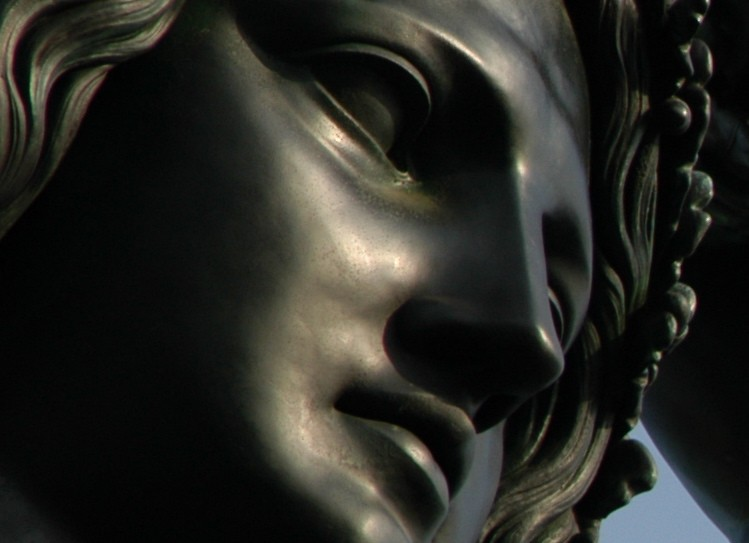
Face

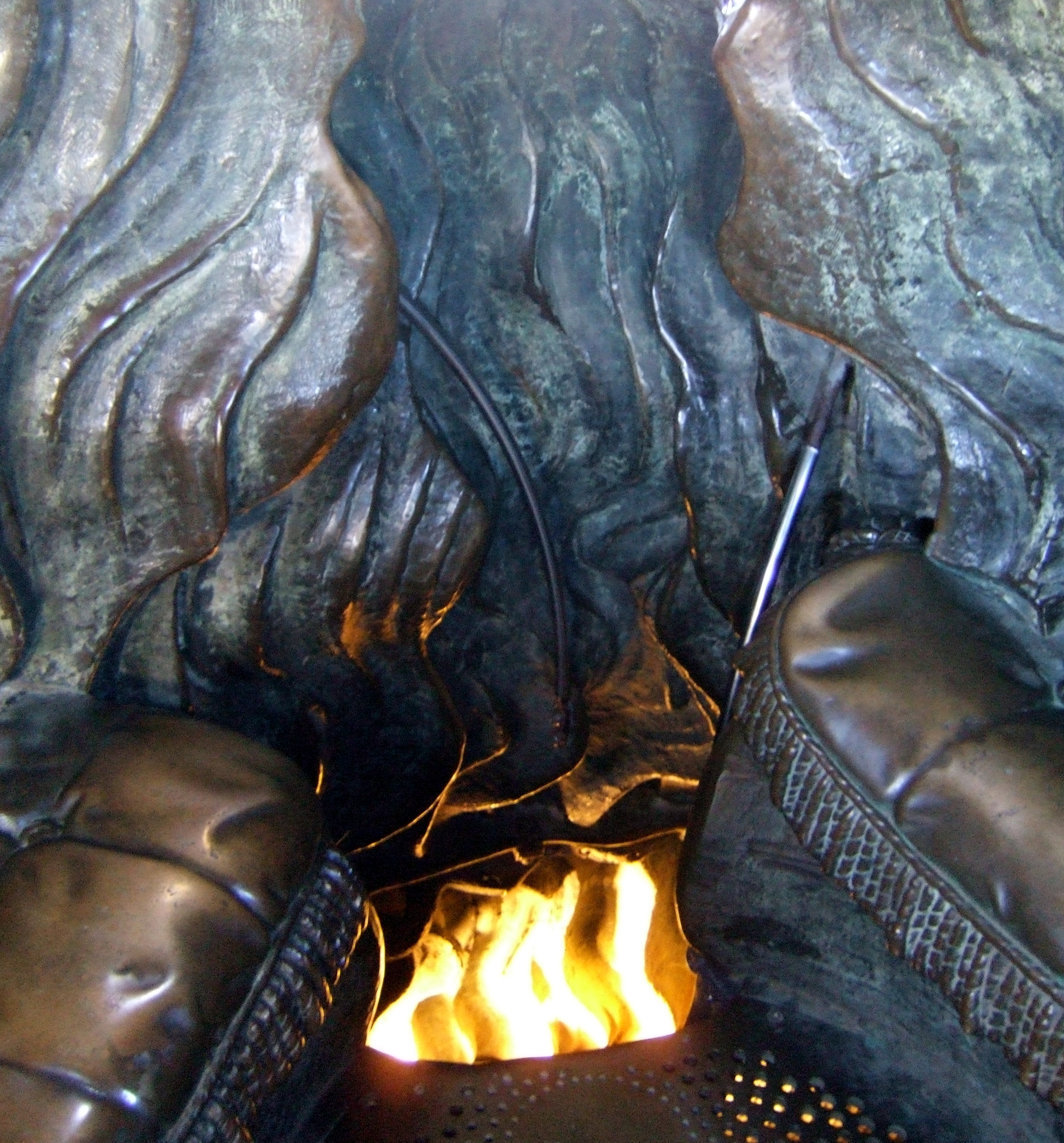
Bronze sofas inside the head

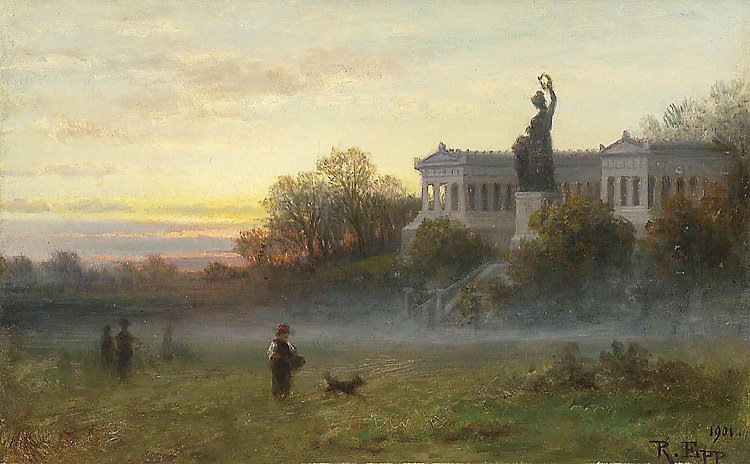
The Bavaria statue and the Theresienwiese where the Munich Oktoberfest takes place each year, by the German realist painter Rudolf Epp (ca. 1900)

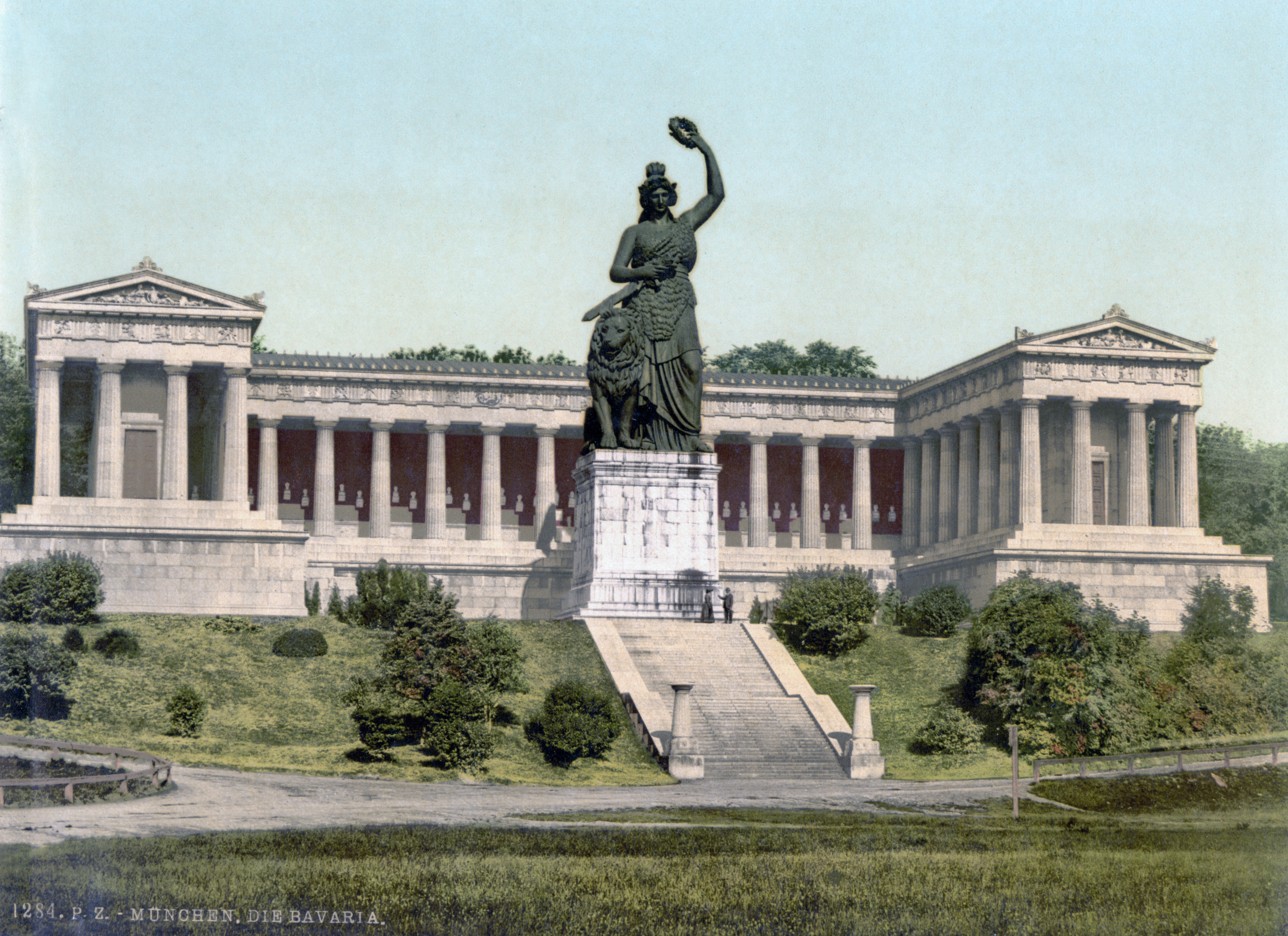
Postcard from the 19th century

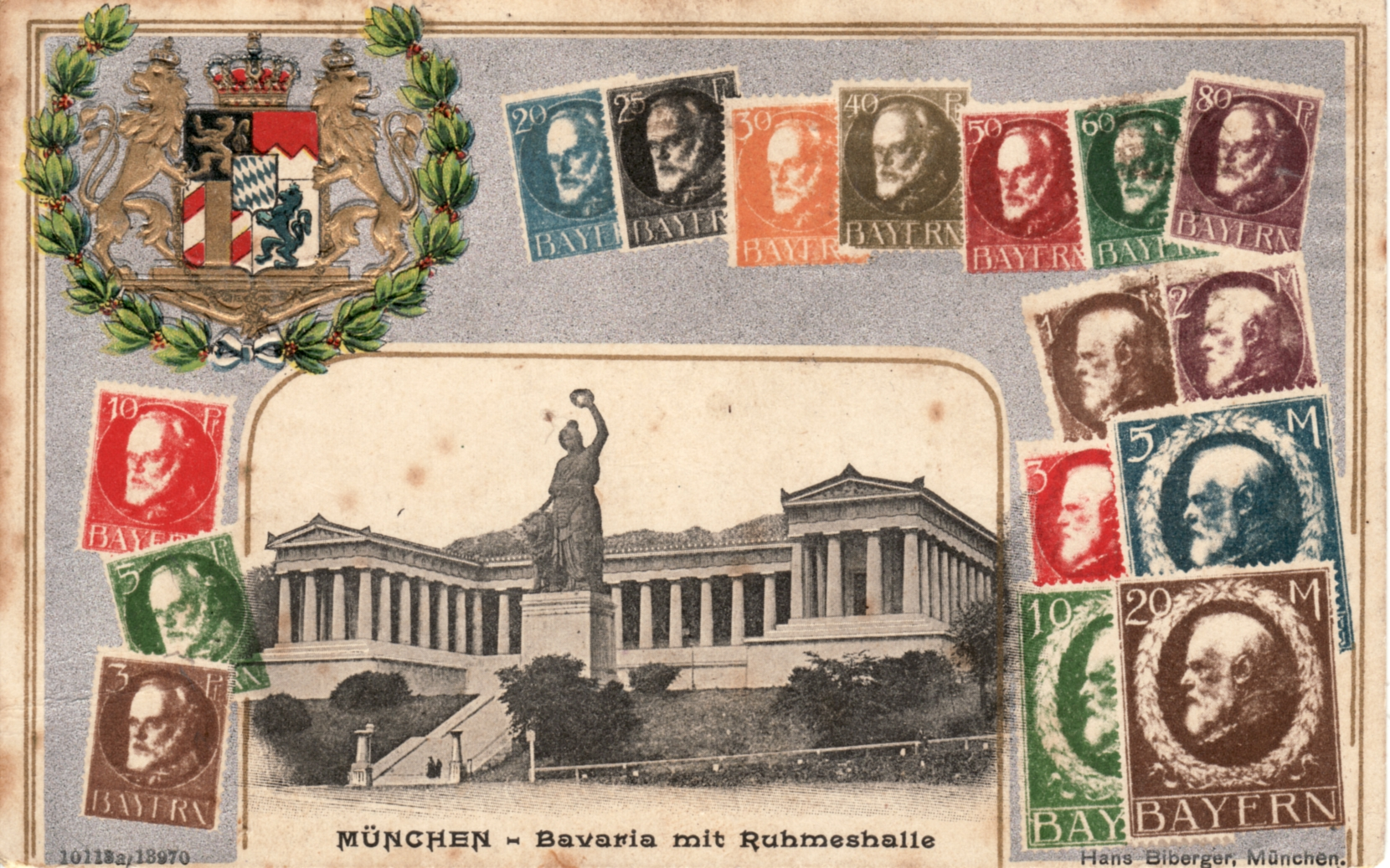
Postcard sent from Munich in 1918: Bavaria and the Hall of Fame, along with the royal Bavarian coat of arms and postage stamps with the portrait of the last Bavarian king, Ludwig III.

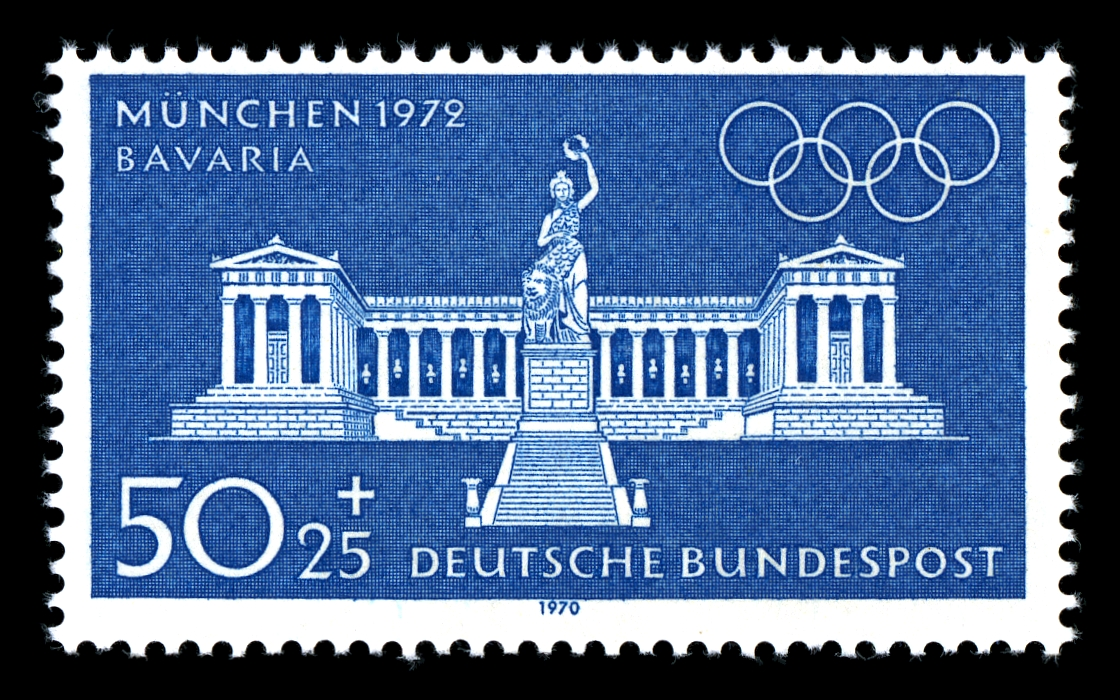
Bavaria and the Hall of Fame on a German special issue postage stamp released in anticipation of the 1972 Olympic Games in Munich

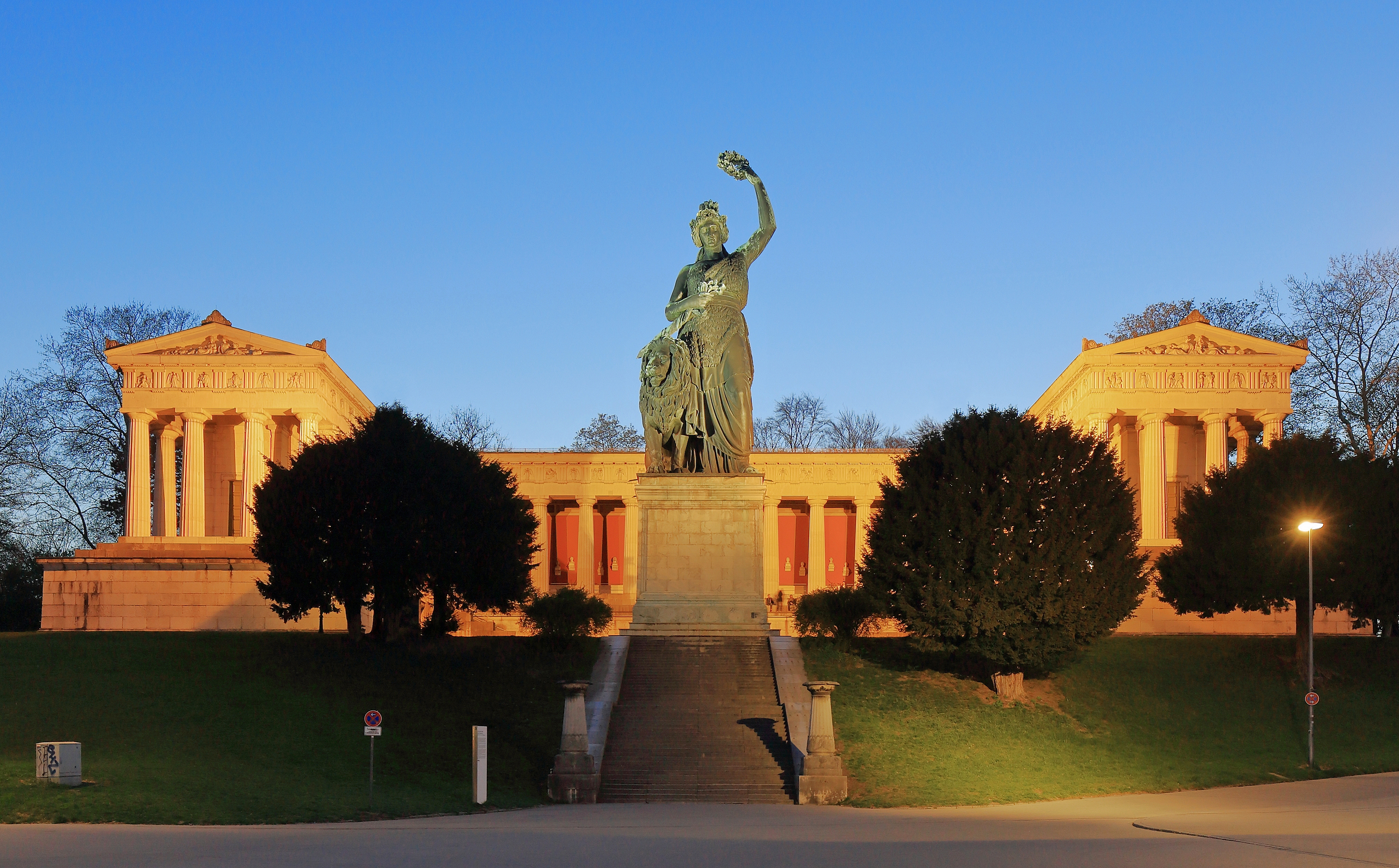
At dusk

== See also ==
- Walhalla (Hall of the Slain, Regensburg, Germany)
- Befreiungshalle (Hall of Liberation, Kelheim, Germany)
- Heldenbert
- Flag and Coat of Arms of Bavaria
- Germania, national personification of Germany
- Deutscher Michel, personification of German people
- Berolina, personification of Berlin
- Hammonia, personification of Hamburg
- Bavaria (symbol)
