= Alcimoennis =

Human settlement in Germany

- Alkimoennis
- Location in Germany
- 48°55′8″N 11°51′36″E
- Type: Oppidum
- Periods: Late La Tène
- Cultures: Celts
- Location: Kelheim
- Region: Bavaria

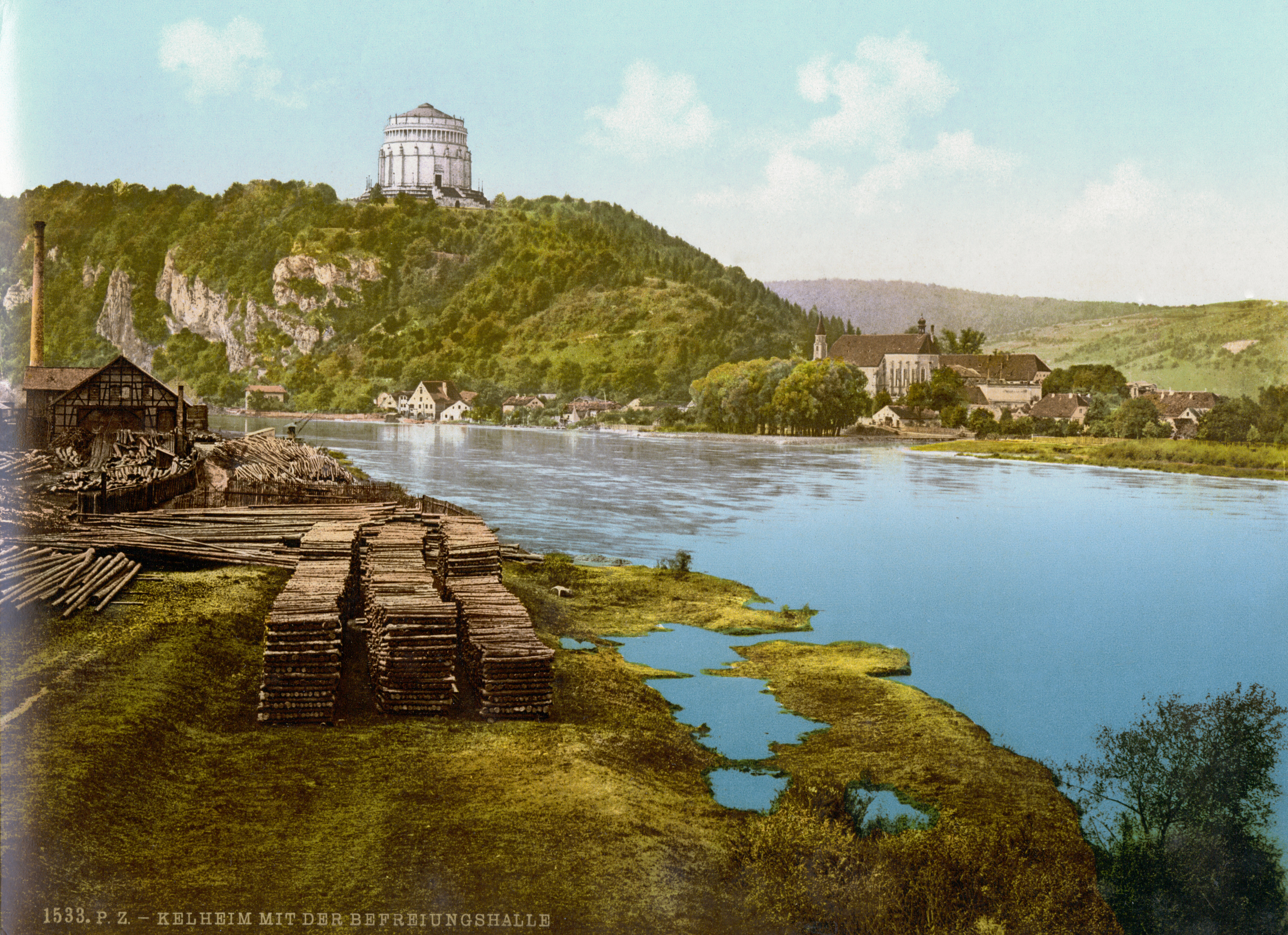
Michelsberg hill, in the nineteenth century

Alcimoennis or Alkimoennis is the name widely attached to a Celtic Oppidum, or hill fort above the modern town of Kelheim in Bavaria, Germany. The name comes from Ptolemy, who in his Geography, only mentioned the name and described the location of the settlement. There is some controversy over the identification of the Kelheim remains with Alcimoennis, but it is still widely accepted.

== Geography ==
=== Location ===
The oppidum was located on the Michelsberg hill, dominating the peninsula at the confluence of the Danube and the Altmühl rivers near Kelheim.

== History ==
The peninsula has been inhabited more or less constantly since 13,000 BCE and the Celts built there as early as 500 BCE.

Findings indicate the presence of an early La Tène period settlement near the Altmühl delta. Numerous storage cellars have been found, interpreted to have been part of three farms with at least 15 buildings from the period of 450 to 380 BCE. For the middle La Tène period (380 to 150 BCE) few signs of local settlement have been discovered: a grave yielded four mid-La Tène fibulae and another a sword with scabbard from the third or second century BCE.

The oppidum dates to the late La Tène period, however, and it is estimated that it was abandoned some time around the middle of the first century BCE.

Who inhabited the oppidum is unclear. It could have been the central settlement of an unknown tribe, possibly a sub-tribe of the Vindelici centered in the nearby (and equally sizeable) Oppidum of Manching.

=== Economy ===
Economically, the Alcimoennis thrived on iron. The surrounding soil contains large concentrations of iron, and the thick forests on all sides delivered adequate fuel for the smelting process. The landscape to the west of the settlement literally, is covered in pock marks left by shallow mine shafts and pits. The valleys around the city contained vast fields for farming as well as livestock, most notably swine. Fishing probably played an important role in everyday life.

There was not much room on the plateau for dwellings. Much of the area protected by the outer rampart was given over to prospecting and smelting activities, precluding its use as living areas. By contrast to Manching, only a fraction of the walled area likely was occupied by buildings. The oppidum's location at the two rivers and between Manching, Berching, and other settlements farther downstream on the Danube, together with the ample supply of wood and iron, likely were the basis for its existence.

Some archaeologists think that the site is better thought of not as a city, but as a walled "industrial" complex, specializing in iron production.

=== Abandonment ===
The reasons for the abandonment of the city remain unknown. If the supposition that Alcimoennis belonged to the Vindelici is correct, then the city may have been abandoned after war with the Germanic Marcomanni tribe that moved in from the north. This nearly destroyed the Vindelici as a people and left their infrastructure in a shambles. In 15 BCE the Romans defeated and incorporated what remained of the Vindelici tribe and the area south of Arcimoenis became the province of Raetia.

=== Later use of the site ===
Mining continued on the plateau until the Middle Ages.

Following victory over the French forces of Napoleon in the Befreiungskriege of the early nineteenth century, the Bavarian King Ludwig I had the monumental Befreiungshalle built directly over the remains of the settlement.

During the same period, the construction of the King Ludwig Main-Danube canal (1836–45) through the Altmühl river valley destroyed the surviving bits of the northern wall as well as any evidence of the waterfront activities the settlement had engaged in.

== Description ==
=== Michelsberg fortifications ===
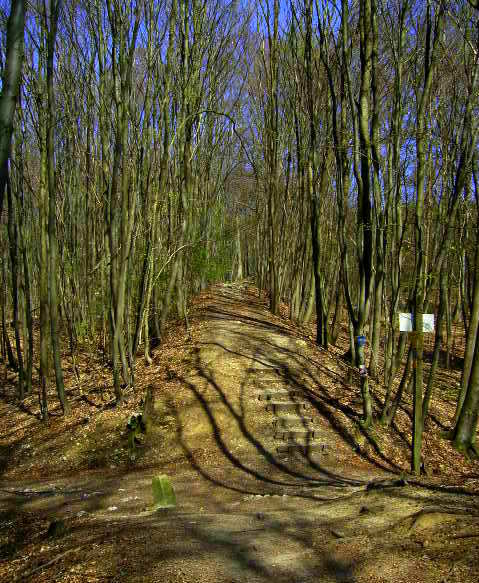
Remains of the outer rampart near Weltenburg Abbey

The exterior wall of the late-Celtic oppidum surrounded the whole Michelsberg and Hirschberg. Inside the area of roughly 600 ha the settlement from the second and first century BCE now referred to as Alcimoennis was located. It is the second largest such site in southern Germany after Heidengraben. The settlement included an artisan quarter at the Mitterfeld and a viereckschanze on an island in the Altmühl. Otherwise, few housing units or graves have been discovered. The oppidum was secured by at least three sectional wall-and-moat defences. All the walls followed the same pfostenschlitzmauer design: tree trunks of roughly 60 cm diameter were pushed into the earth at least 1 m deep and roughly 2 m apart. On the outward-facing side, the space between the wooden beams was closed with limestone sheets from nearby quarries to a height of at least 5 to 6 m. The earthen ramparts which supported the back were around 10 to 11 m wide. An estimate puts the need for construction materials at more than 8,000 trees, 17,000 cubic m of limestone, and 35,000 cubic m of earth. It would have taken at 50 workers at least 70 years to build such a wall. The remains of four de:Zangentore (gates) have been discovered as entries though the walls.

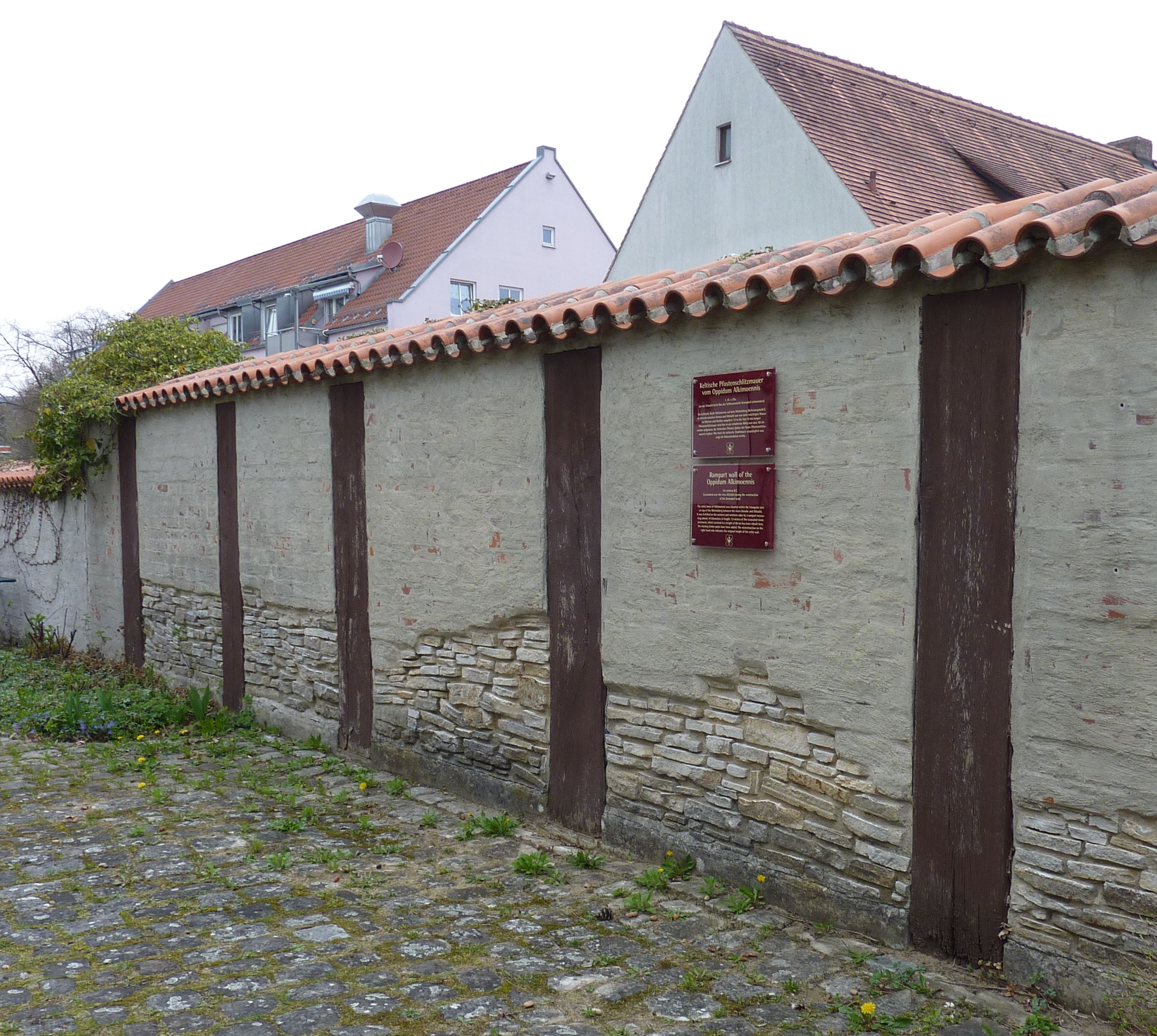
Reconstruction of a pfostenschlitzmauer at Kelheim

The outer rampart crossed the peninsula, connecting the cliffs above the Danube near the later Weltenburg Abbey to the southern bank of the Altmühl, a distance of 3.3 km. It likely was built in three separate stages and at some places reached a height of 6 m, averaging around 2 to 3 m. A moat was present only at some points, which has raised questions about its defensive character - it might simply have been holes dug to gain construction materials. The wall also was built in pfostenschlitz style, pierced in only three places by Zangentore. The connecting wall following the southern bank of the Altmühl was added only in the last, the third, stage of construction.

The inner rampart, also connected the cliffs overlooking the Danube to the Altmühl. It is 930 m long and extant to a height of up to 4 m. On its outer side is a moat (2 m deep, 7 m wide) and a berm (5 m). Two Zangentore gave access to the Michelsberg. In construction the inner rampart resembled the outer one. It was completely rebuilt once.

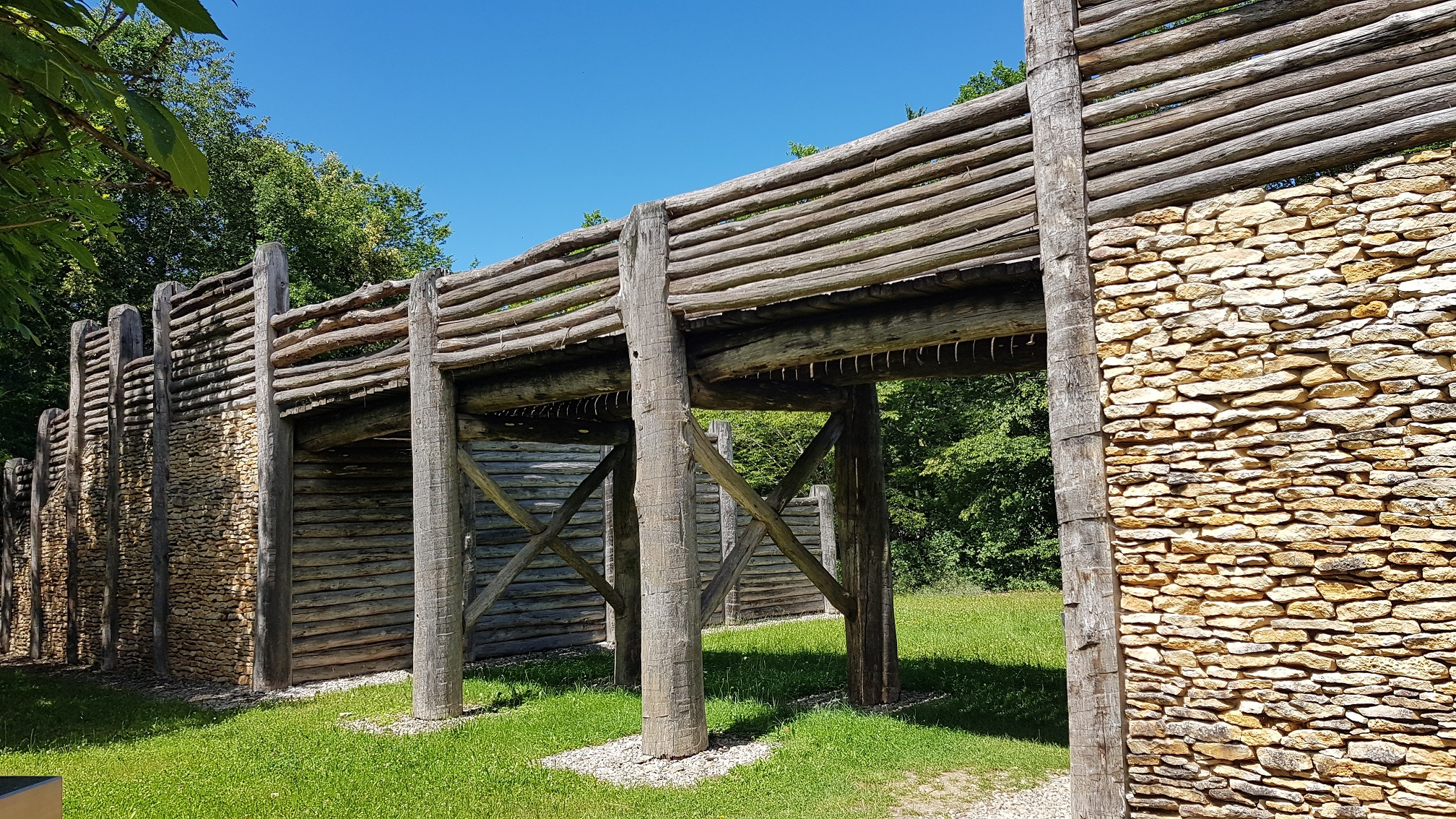
Reconstruction of a gate at the Celtic oppidum of Kelheim, La Tene period

Along the southern bank of the Altmühl a 3.3 km long wall was added during the latest period of construction. This was the structure that was destroyed by canal construction in the nineteenth century. Excavations uncovered evidence of one gate (added later), however, and this wall had been of the pfostenschlitz-type. The wall likely curved south at its eastern end, at what is today the Radlmüllergraben, west of the old town of Kelheim.

=== Prospecting pits ===
The area between outer and inner rampart is covered by prospecting pits and mine dumps, both Celtic and Medieval in origin. These occupy more than half of the plateau. Remains of ovens and charcoal indicate that smelting took place right there. Among slag heaps behind the inner rampart, excavations have found the remains of at least one La-Tène period and three Medieval smelters.

=== Dwellings ===
The remains of dwellings have been found in the Altmühlaue and the Mitterfeld, both at the foot of the hill. Some of those showed signs of having been destroyed by fire. Evidence was found to identify one of the houses as the workshop of a bronze founder.

Overall very little remains of the settlement; stone construction was foreign to the Celts and their thatched-roofed wooden structures mostly have disappeared over time.

=== Viereckschanze ===
A viereckschanze of roughly 100 by 100 m size was located in an elevated area in the Altmühl delta. It was discovered in 1909. In 1978 or 1979, before its destruction by the canal, some excavations were conducted. By that time, the interior had already been completely destroyed by use as a gravel pit. The moat was up to 8 m wide and up to 3.2 m deep. To the east of the structure, a small burial site of 19 late La-Tène graves has been discovered. To the north of the viereckschanze remains of buildings have been found, but their use is unknown, they could have been used as dwellings or as warehouses.

=== Graveyards ===
Numerous Bronze- and Iron-age graveyards dot the woods around Alcimoennis, and likely hold deceased residents of the city. Despite their frequency, the graves are far too few to house the many inhabitants the city once had, which indicates that the city normally used alternative means of interment such as cremation for the majority of residents and reserved burial for important members of society. These graveyards have been the source of many discoveries, including many impeccably preserved and elaborately decorated urns and the Steer of Michelsberg, a bronze figurine in the shape of a steer from around 200 BCE. Most of the known graveyards consist of groups of 1-to-2-meter-high (3.3 to 6.6 ft) grave mounds that still are quite visible today, notably around the nearby village of Altessing.

== Excavations ==
Notable findings include a bronze wine jug (probably imported from Campania) discovered in 1863 in a grave near the centre of the oppidum. This also contained a spear head and a sword. Several other items were found in a grave in the so-called Mitterfeld at the foot of the Michelberg. Scientific excavations were conducted in 1959 and 1960, directed by K. Schwarz and between 1964 and 1972 by F.-R. Hermann. Further discoveries were made in the 1980s during the construction of the Rhine–Main–Danube Canal by B. Engelhardt, B.-R. Goetze and M. Hoppe.

== Identification of the site as Alcimoennis ==
The geographer Ptolemy mentioned Alcimoennis in his Geography as a settlement in southern Germania north of the Danube. Since the Altmühl river was known in the Middle Ages as Alcmona or Alcmuna, the remains of a large-scale settlement at the river's confluence with the Danube have been identified as Alcimoennis. de:Paul Reinecke was the first to identify the Kelheim location with Alcimoennis in 1924.
