= Ruhmeshalle (Munich) =

Building in Schwanthalerhöhe, Upper Bavaria, Germany

Coordinates: 48°07′51″N 11°32′44″E

The Ruhmeshalle (German pronunciation: [ˈʁuːməsˌhalə], lit. 'Hall of Fame') is a Doric colonnade with a main range and two wings, designed by Leo von Klenze for Ludwig I of Bavaria. Built in 1853, it is situated on an ancient ledge above the Theresienwiese in Munich and was built as part of a complex which also includes the Bavariapark and the Bavaria statue. It is built of Kelheim limestone and is 68 metres long and 32 metres deep.

With the construction and exhibition of busts of important people from Bavaria, including the Palatinate, Franconia and Swabia, King Ludwig intended to create a hall of fame that honors laudable and distinguished people of his kingdom, as he did also in the Walhalla memorial for all of Germany.

In 1944, a bombing raid caused several busts' destruction.

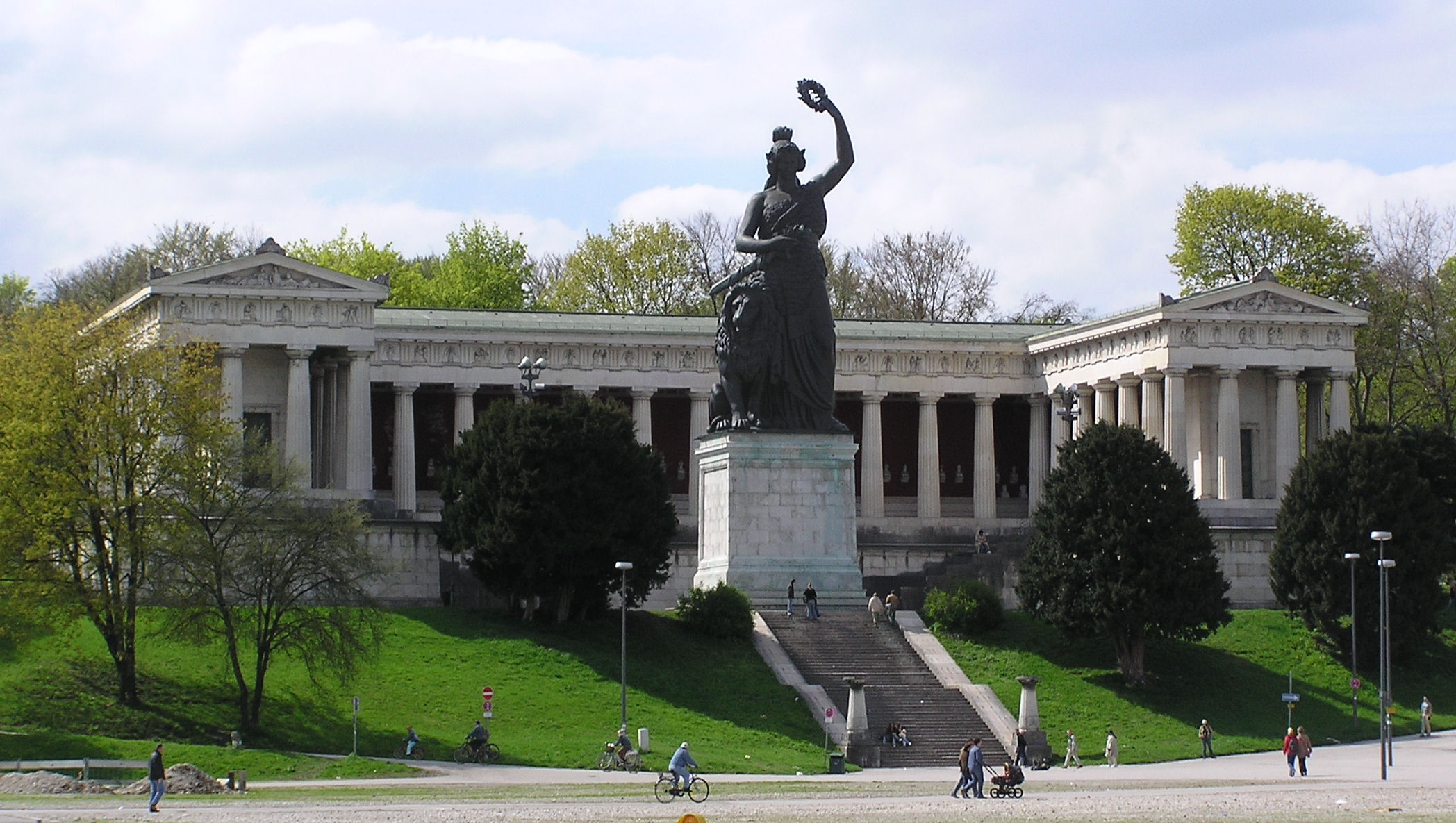
The Ruhmeshalle with the statue of Bavaria by Ludwig Schwanthaler

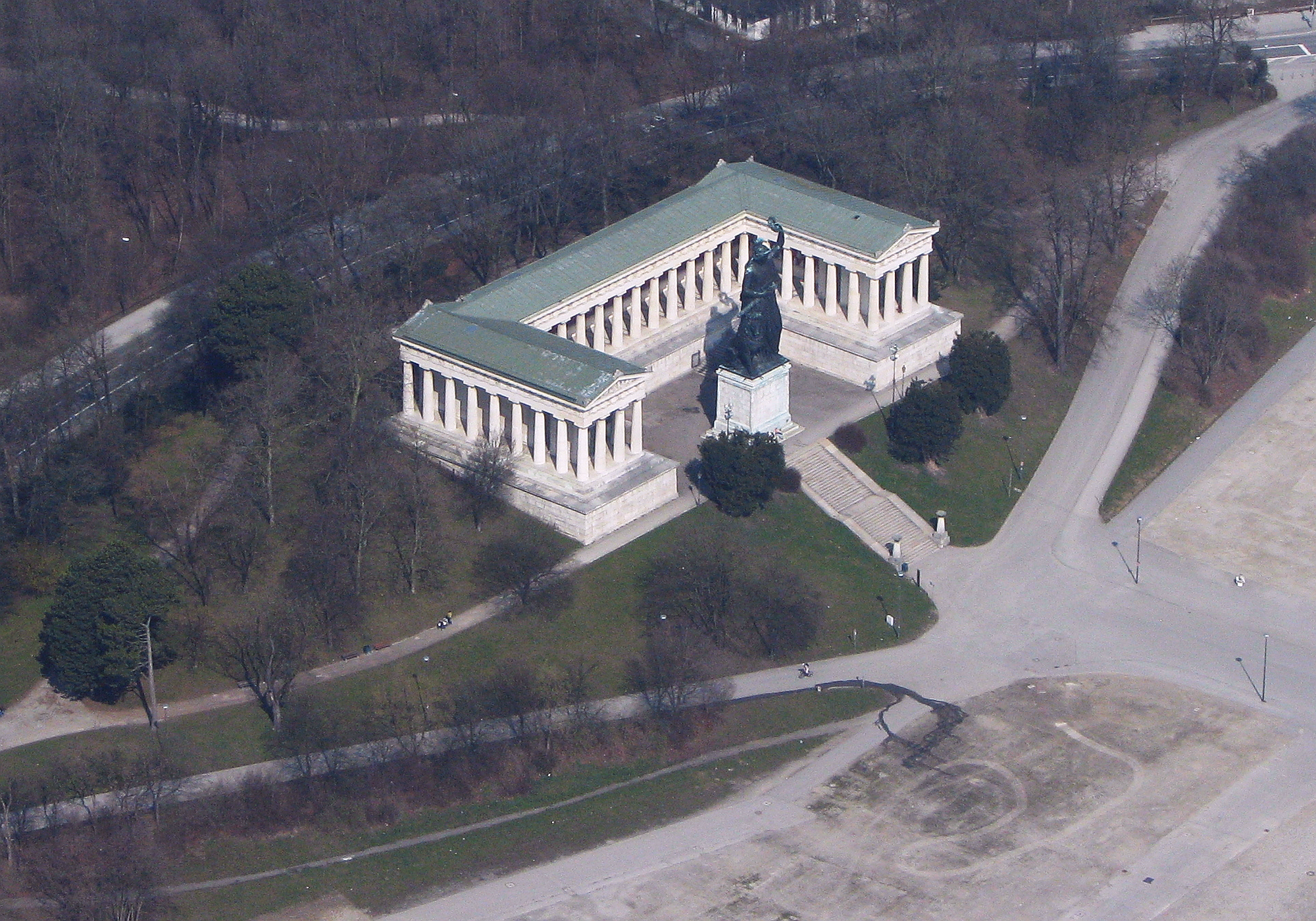
Aerial photograph: Ruhmeshalle and Bavaria monument (2009)

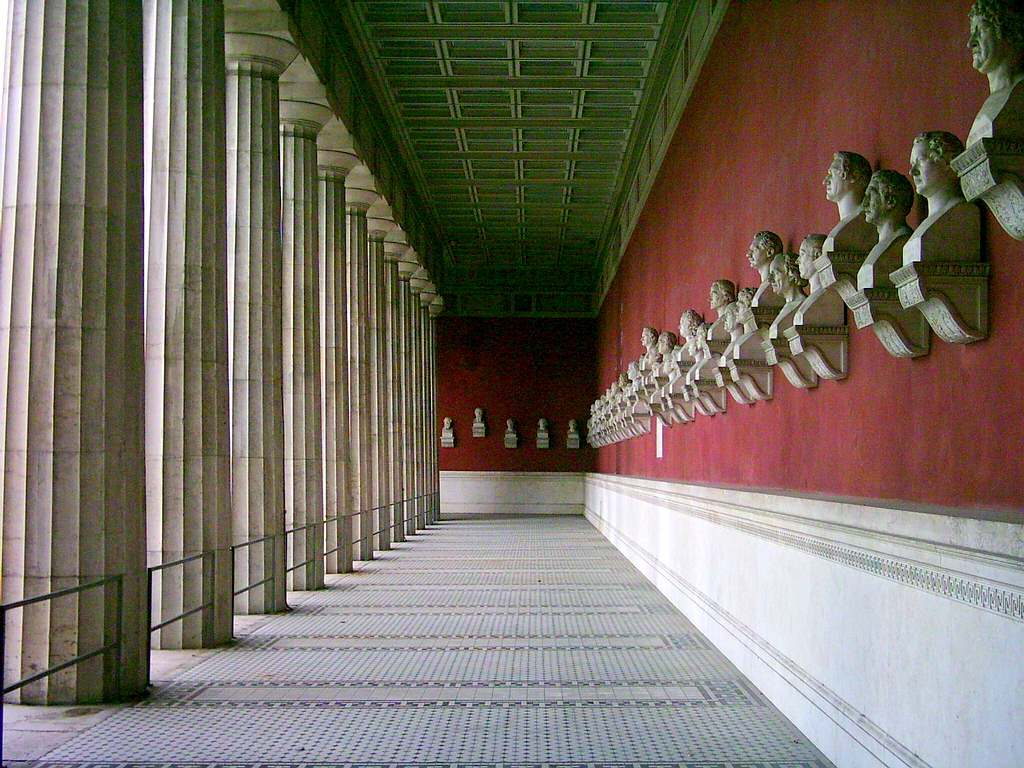
Interior of the Ruhmeshalle

== See also ==
- Befreiungshalle (Hall of Liberation, Kelheim, Germany)
- Heldenberg Memorial (Austria)
- Hermannsdenkmal (Hermann monument, Teutoburg Forest, Germany)
- Walhalla (memorial) in Donaustauf
