= Pollmann =

Pollmann is a surname. Notable people with the surname include:

- Erika Pollmann (born 1944), German sprinter
- Karla Pollmann (born 1963), German classical scholar
- Tim Pollmann (born 1990), German footballer

== See also ==
- Pellmann
