= Pellmann =

Pellmann is a surname. Notable people with the surname include:

- Donald Pellmann (1915–2020), American centenarian multi world-record-setting masters athlete
- Sören Pellmann (born 1977), German politician

== See also ==
- Hellmann
- Pollmann
