= Michelsberg (Kelheim) =

Mountain in Germany

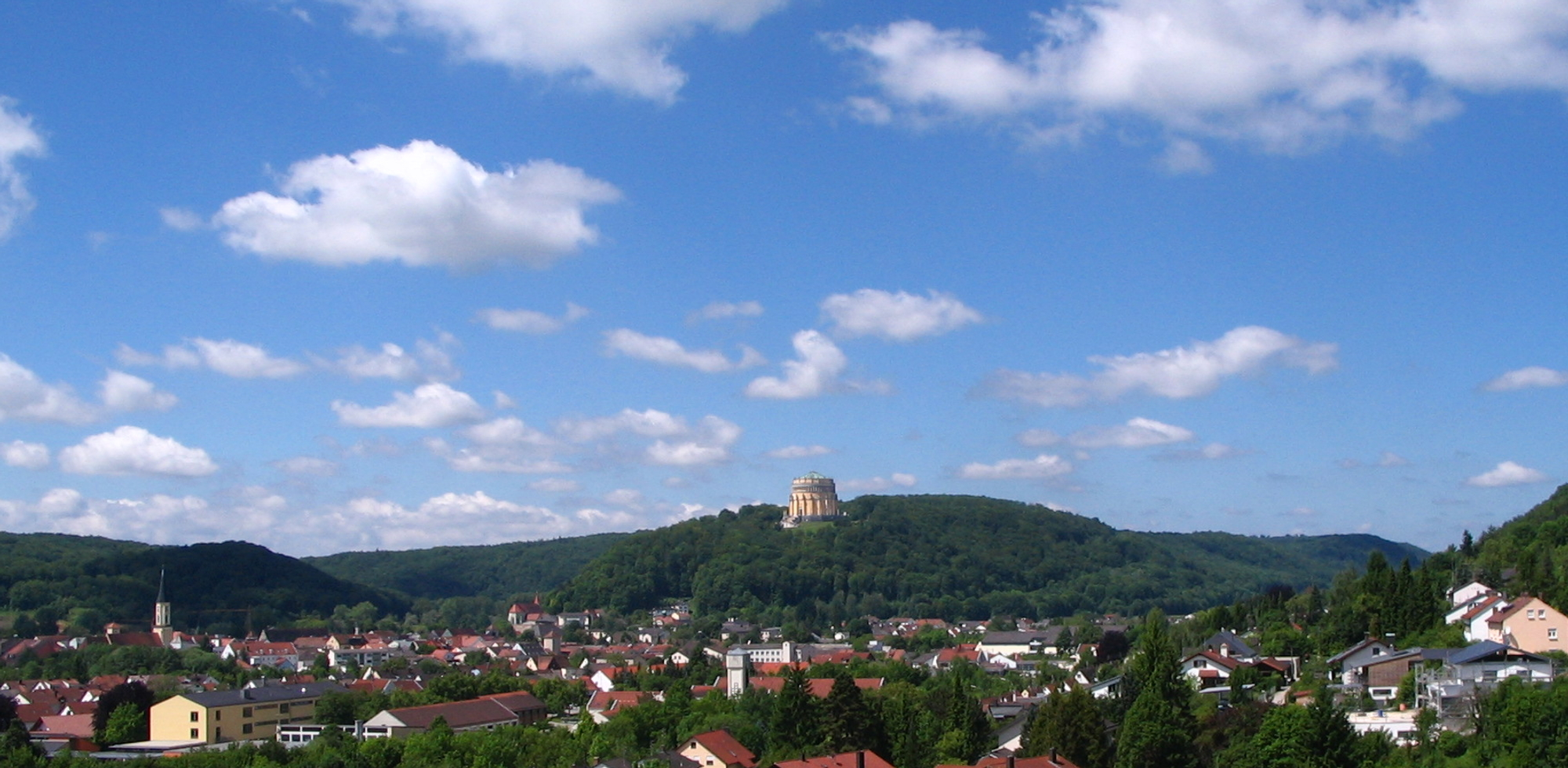
- Michelsberg with Befreiungshalle

Highest point
- Elevation: 126 m (413 ft)
- Coordinates: 48°55′06″N 11°51′37″E

Geography
- Location: Bavaria, Germany

Michelsberg (Kelheim) is a hill in the town of Kelheim, Bavaria, Germany.
