= Tim Pollmann =

German footballer

Personal information
- Date of birth: 5 January 1990 (age 36)
- Place of birth: Kelheim, Germany
- Height: 1.85 m (6 ft 1 in)
- Position: Central defender

Team information
- Current team: FC Ingolstadt II
- Number: 2

Youth career
- –2002: SV Saal an der Donau
- 2002–2008: Jahn Regensburg

Senior career*
Years	Team	Apps	(Gls)
2008–2009	Jahn Regensburg	10	(2)
2009–	FC Ingolstadt II		
- * Club domestic league appearances and goals as of 14 August 2010

Tim Pollmann (born 5 January 1990) is a German footballer who plays as a central defender for FC Ingolstadt II.

== Career ==
Pollmann began his career with SV Saal an der Donau and later joined Jahn Regensburg. In Regensburg he played six years in the youth team and was promoted to first team in November 2008, making his debut on 8 November 2008 against VfB Stuttgart II.

He signed a 3-year contract with FC Ingolstadt 04 on 29 January 2009 and moved to Ingolstadt on 1 July 2009.

== See also ==
- Football in Germany
- List of football clubs in Germany
