= Viereckschanze =

Type of Iron Age site in Western Europe

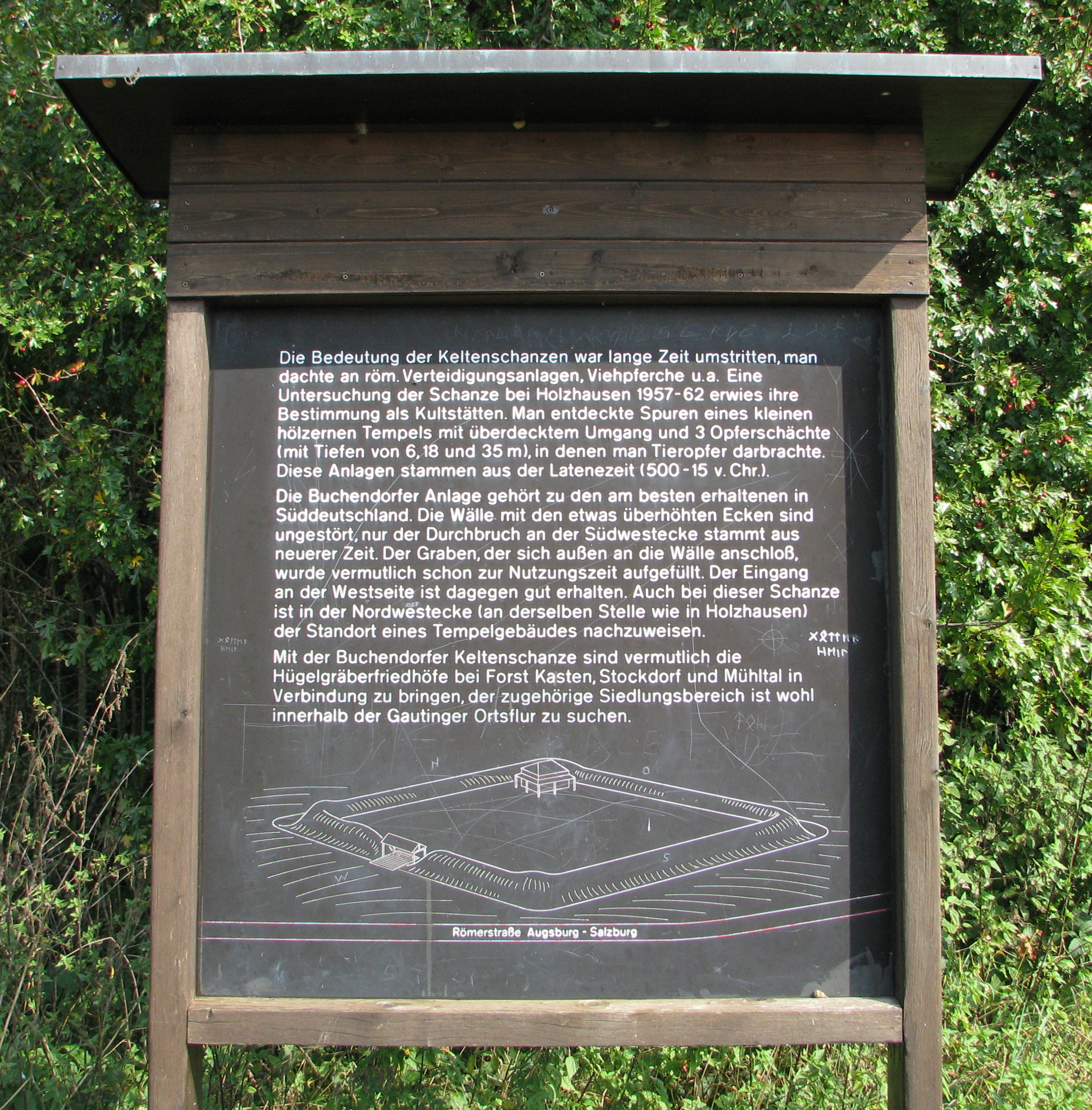
Drawing of the Viereckschanze Buchendorf in Germany

A Viereckschanze (from German "four-corner-rampart"; plural -en) is a rectangular ditched enclosure that was constructed during the Iron Age in parts of Celtic Western Europe. They are widespread in Germany, parts of northern France and also in some regions of the Iberian Peninsula, most notably in Portugal.

== See also ==
- Nemeton
