= Befreiungshalle =

Architectural heritage monument in Germany

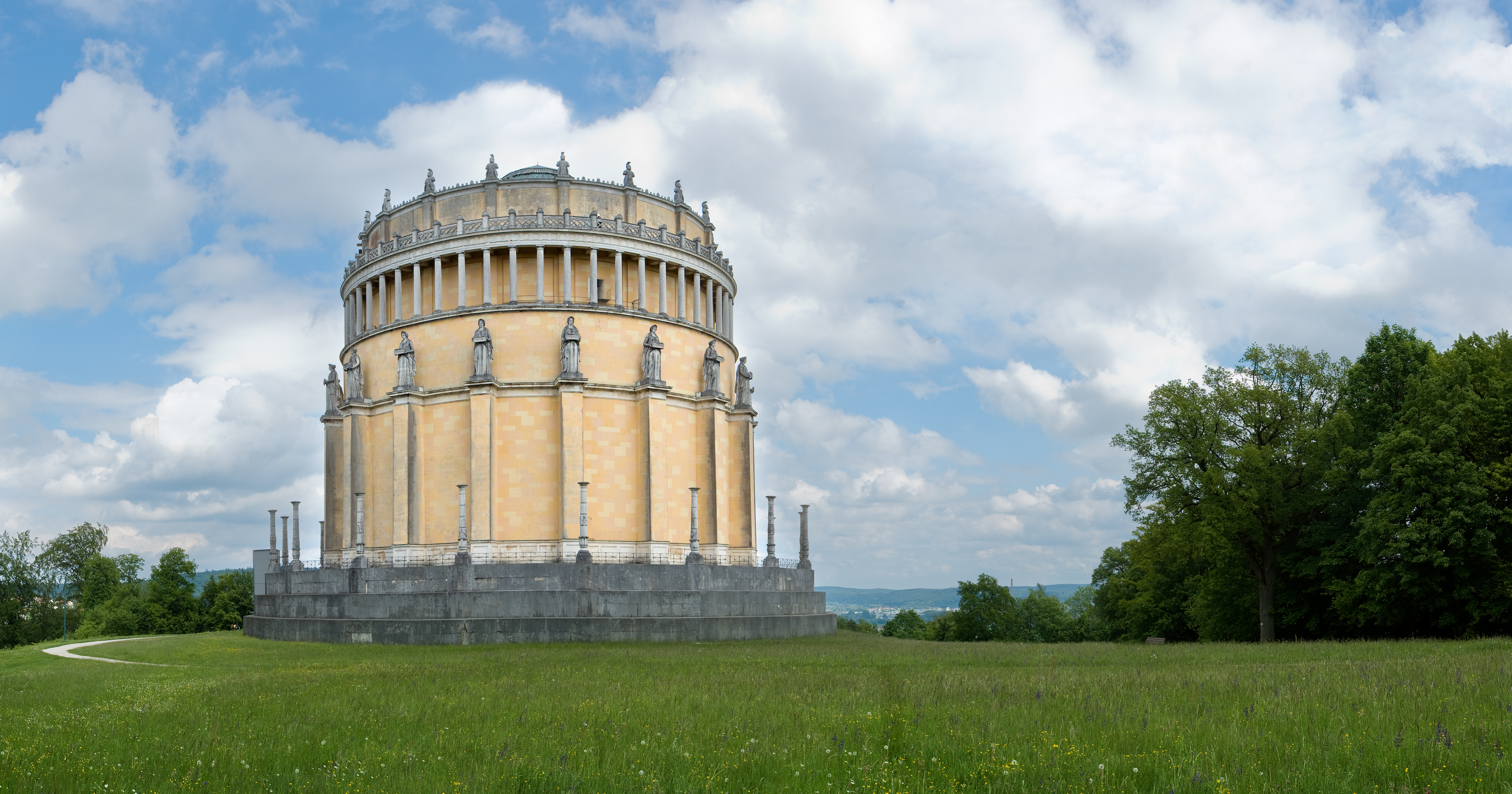
- Befreiungshalle Kelheim

- Location within Bavaria Location within Germany
- Interactive map of the Befreiungshalle area

General information
- Architectural style: Neoclassical
- Location: Kelheim, Germany
- Coordinates: 48°55′06″N 11°51′38″E
- Client: King Ludwig I of Bavaria
- Owner: Bavarian Administration of State-Owned Palaces, Gardens and Lakes

Design and construction
- Architects: Friedrich von Gärtner, Leo von Klenze
- Designations: Baudenkmal (listed monument)

The Befreiungshalle ("Hall of Liberation", German: [bəˈfʀaɪ̯ʊŋsˌhalə]) is a neoclassical monument on the Michelsberg hill above the town of Kelheim in Bavaria, Germany. It stands upstream of Regensburg on the river Danube at the confluence of the Danube and the Altmühl, i.e. the Rhine–Main–Danube Canal. It is just downstream of the Danube Gorge, towering above its lower end. It was commissioned by King Ludwig I of Bavaria to commemorate the victory over Napoleon in the Befreiungskriege of 1813–1815.

== History ==
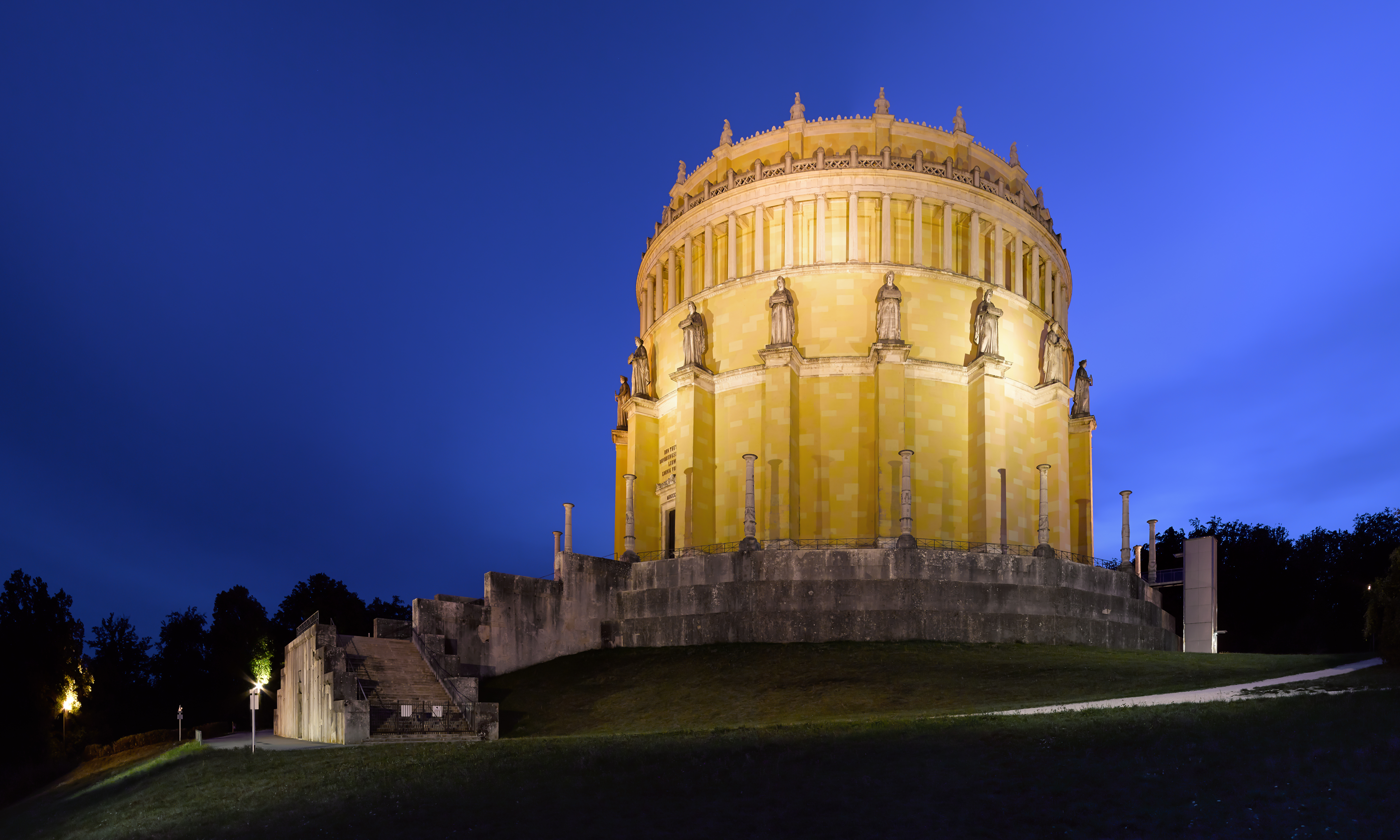
Befreiungshalle at night

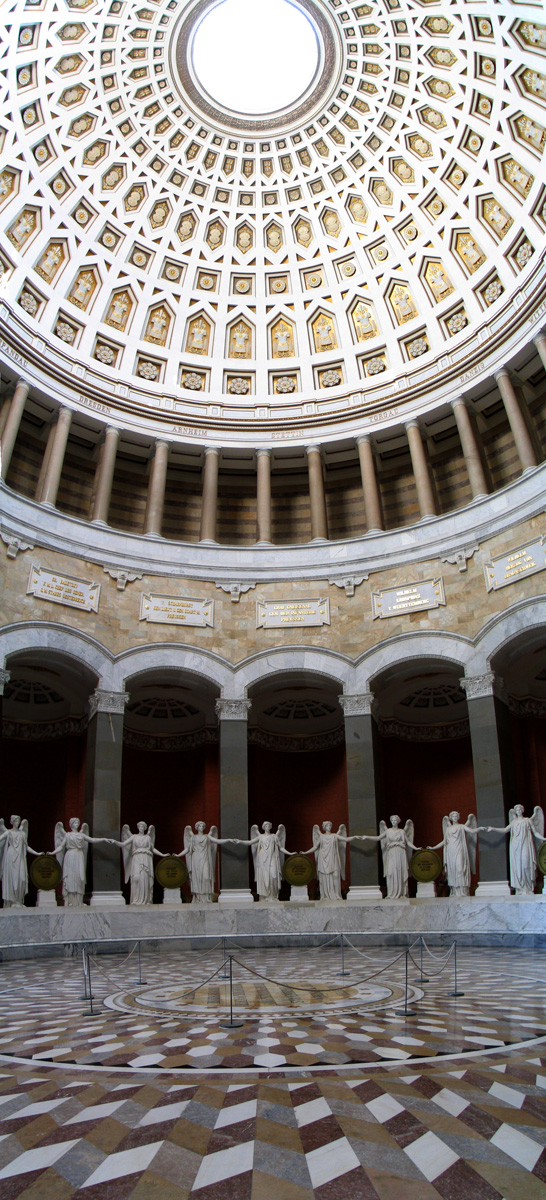
Interior with sculptures by Ludwig Schwanthaler

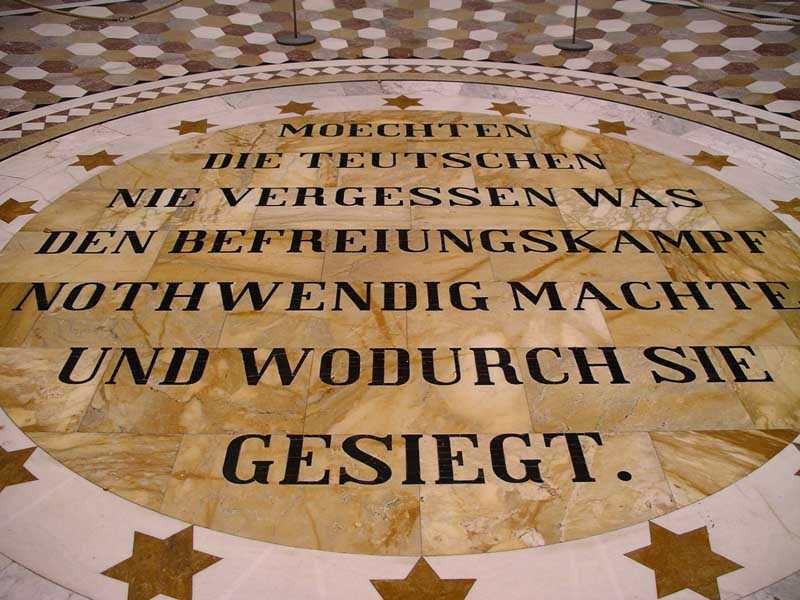
Floor inscription

King Ludwig I of Bavaria ordered the Befreiungshalle to be built in order to commemorate the victories against Napoleon during the Wars of Liberation that lasted from 1813 to 1815.

The construction was started in 1842 by Friedrich von Gärtner in a mixture of Neoclassical and Christian styles. It occurred on Michelsberg, in a place previously occupied by a part of the ruins of a pre-historic fortification or town, thought by some to have been Alcimoennis. At the behest of the King, Leo von Klenze later altered the plans and completed the building in 1863. The ceremonial opening took place on 18 October 1863 – the 50th anniversary of the Battle of Nations (Völkerschlacht) near Leipzig.

The following dictum by King Ludwig I, embedded into the marble floor, commemorates the occasion of the construction of the Befreiungshalle:

MOECHTEN
DIE TEUTSCHEN
NIE VERGESSEN WAS
DEN BEFREIUNGSKAMPF
NOTHWENDIG MACHTE
UND WODURCH SIE
GESIEGT

Translation:

May
the Germans
never forget what
made necessary
the Struggle for Freedom
and by what means they
won

This inscription of dedication is to be found above the ornamented door frame of the entrance portal:

DEN TEUTSCHEN
BEFREIUNGSKAEMPFERN
LUDWIG I
KOENIG VON BAYERN

Translation:

To the German
Liberation Fighters
Ludwig I
King of Bavaria

For the celebration of the first stone laying on 19 October Ludwig I had a poem written dedicated to the soldiers who had fought in the Napoleonic Wars. Joseph Hartmann Stutz had set it to music:

German	English
1. Heil Euch, wack’re Männer, muth’ge Krieger, Die errungen Ihr den Heldenkranz, Heil Euch, treue Teutsche, tapf’re Sieger! Ewig währet Eurer Thaten Glanz.	1. Hail to you, valiant men, brave warriors Who have won a hero's wreath, Hail to you, faithful Germans, courageous victors! The brightness of your deeds will last forever.
2. Dumpf und finster hatt es uns umgeben, Und kein Teutschland gab es damals mehr; Ihr doch schwangt auf’s Neue es zum Leben, Siegreich ragt es wieder hoch und hehr!	2. We were surrounded by dull and dark forces, And Germany did no longer exist; But you reanimated her, And now she stands again victoriously and sublime!
3. Dass die Zwietracht schmählich uns gekettet, Dies vergessen werde nie und nie, Dass die Eintracht uns allein gerettet, Die der Heimath Ruhm und Sieg verlieh.	3. We will never forget That discord ignominiously chained us And that unity alone saved us, Unity which granted glory and victory to our country.
4. Durch der Zeiten weite Ferne schlinge Immer sich der Eintracht heilig Band, In des Teutschen Seele sie durchdringe, Unbesiegt bleibt dann das Vaterland.	4. May forever wind The holy band of concord, May it enter the German's soul, Then the fatherland will remain unvanquished.

== Today ==
The hall, including the upper exterior gallery, is open to the public.

== Architecture ==
The powerful-looking rotunda made of Kelheim limestone rests on a three-tier base, which is designed as an octadecagon. The outer facade is divided by 18 pillars with 18 colossal statues by Johann Halbig as allegories of the German tribes that took part in the battles. These are: "Franconian, Bohemian, Tyrolean, Bavarian, Austrian, Prussian, Hanoverian, Moravian, Saxony, Silesian, Brandenburger, Pomeranian, Mecklenburg, Westphalia, Hesse, Thuringian, Rhinelander, Swabia" (circulating in this order with an arbitrary start).

The round hall has a height of 45 metres (148 ft) and a diameter of 29 metres (95 ft). Its interior is illuminated by a dome. The inner gallery can be reached via 82 steps. Another 40 steps lead to the outer viewing terrace, from which one has a wide view of the Danube and Altmühl valleys. Since the 2008 season, the cupola hall has also been accessible by elevator for wheelchair users and the disabled.

The interior of the hall is designed as a large domed hall, which is lit by an oculus at the apex of the dome. The walls are articulated by 18 segmental arched niches, above which there is an area for inscriptions, and a final gallery of columns of Tuscan order. In front of the niches, which bear the names of the battles of the wars of liberation, there are two 3.3-metre (11 ft) high statues of Victoria, the Roman goddess of victory, resulting in a total of 34 statues. The goddesses of victory join hands in a solemn dance, with the exception of the two figures standing directly next to the entrance. The latter were made of white marble from Tyrol. Since this was very expensive, the remaining Victorias were made of white Carrara marble. They were designed by Ludwig Schwanthaler, who also made two Victories himself, namely the two end figures at the entrance. The other stills were created with the sculptors Arnold Hermann Lossow and Max von Widnmann. In the niches between two Victories there are 17 gilded bronze shields, which, like the 7-metre (23 ft) high entrance gate of the hall, were cast from captured artillery pieces. The large number of goddesses of victory, who shake hands in a gesture of unity, refers to the member states of the German Confederation, which actually fluctuated between 35 and 39. The monument thus also contained a commitment to the political status quo, in this case to the princely state federalism in Germany, which, in contrast to the establishment of an all-German national state demanded by the bourgeoisie, meant that the individual German states were largely independent.

The obvious preference for the number 18 is due to the fact that both the Battle of Leipzig and the Battle of Waterloo took place on an 18th day of the month. It can also be found in the number of 54 columns and 54 pillars (3 × 18), in the twice 36 columns in the upper gallery (2 × 18) and in the inscriptions for 18 generals and recaptured fortresses.

== See also ==
- Völkerschlachtdenkmal (Monument to the Battle of the Nations, Leipzig, Germany)
- Walhalla temple (Hall of the Slain, Regensburg, Germany)
- Ruhmeshalle (Hall of Fame, Munich, Germany)
- Heldenberg Memorial (in Austria)
- Prussian National Monument for the Liberation Wars, Berlin, Germany
