= Kelheim =

- Town
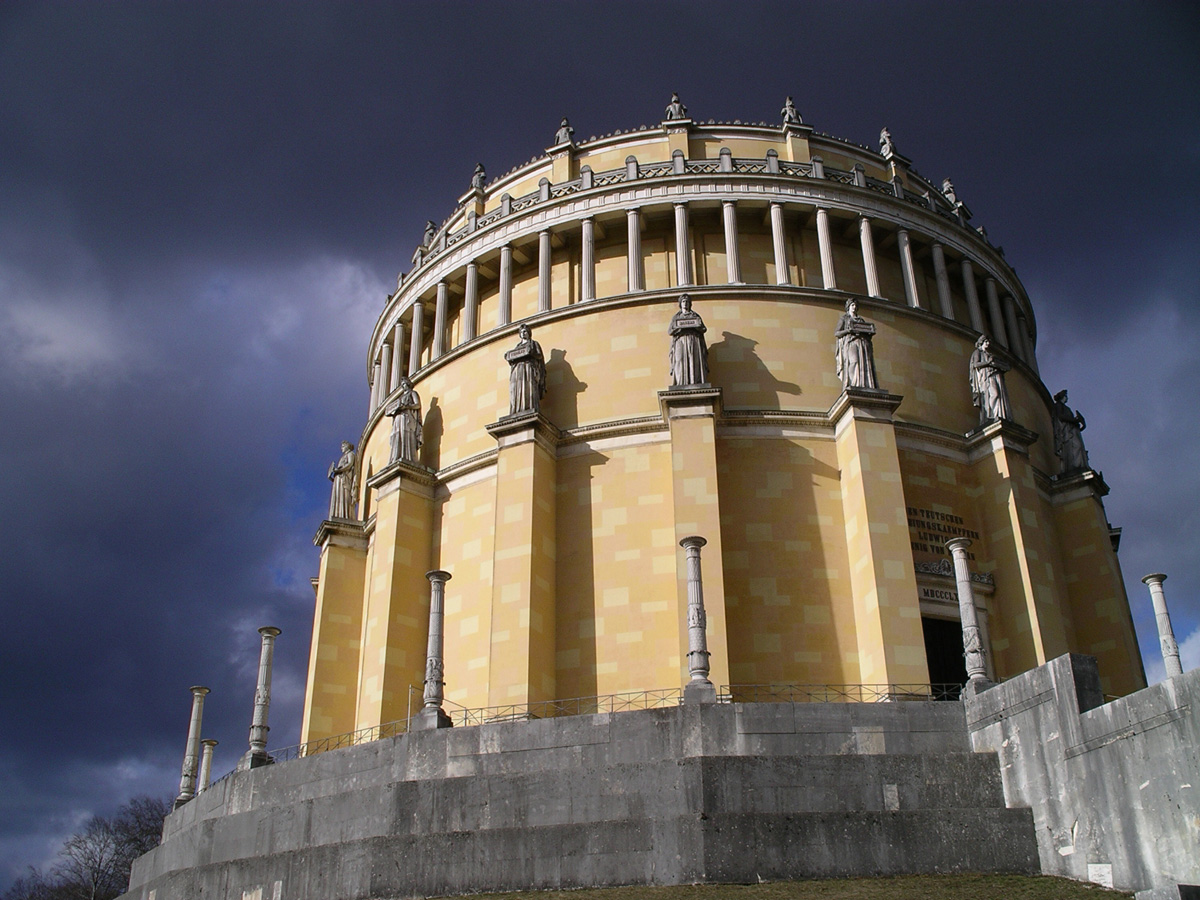
- Befreiungshalle monument

- Coat of arms

- Location of Kelheim within Kelheim district
- Interactive map of Kelheim
- Location within Germany Location within Bavaria
- Coordinates: 48°55′N 11°52′E
- Country: Germany
- State: Bavaria
- Admin. region: Lower Bavaria
- District: Kelheim

Government
  - Mayor (2020–26): Christian Schweiger (CSU)

Area
  - Total: 76.68 km^{2} (29.61 sq mi)
- Elevation: 343 m (1,125 ft)

Population (2025-12-31)
  - Total: 17,108
  - Density: 223.1/km^{2} (577.8/sq mi)
- Time zone: UTC+01:00 (CET)
  - Summer (DST): UTC+02:00 (CEST)
- Postal codes: 93301–93309
- Dialling codes: 09441
- Vehicle registration: KEH
- Website: www.kelheim.de

Kelheim (German: [ˈkeːlhaɪ̯m]) is a town and municipality in Bavaria, Germany. It is the capital of the district Kelheim and is situated at the confluence of the rivers Altmühl and Danube. Kelheim has a population of around 16,750 (2020).

== History ==
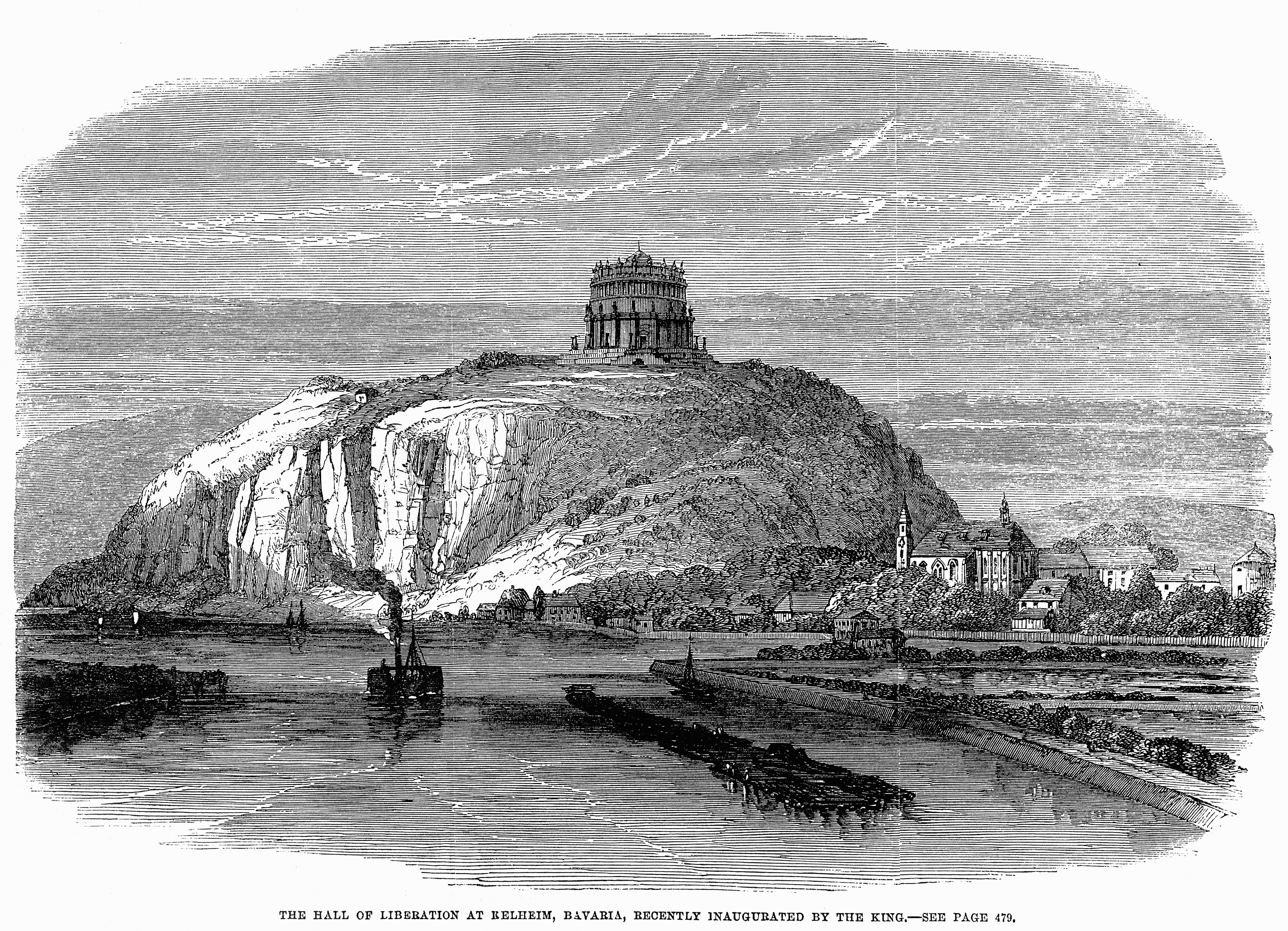
Engraving of the Befreiungshalle, or Hall of Liberation, one of Kelheim's best-known landmarks, just after its construction

Kelheim is the site of a large Iron Age oppidum from the La Tène period, which has been tentatively identified with the Celtic city of Alcimoennis mentioned by Ptolemy in his Geography. The ramparts of the fort cross the promontory between the rivers Altmühl and Danube. There is an inner defensive line enclosing 60 ha near the confluence, then a long outer rampart enclosing an enormous area of 630 ha. A small promontory fort on the other bank of the Danube has a series of short linear ramparts protecting a settlement in the bend of a meander. This is aligned with the end of the outer rampart on the far bank, dominating traffic on the river. Kelheim has given its name to the pfostenschlitzmauer style of rampart construction characterized by vertical wooden posts set into the stone facing.

Kelheim was first mentioned in the 9th century. At this time it was the seat of a count (Graf). According to tradition of Braunau in Rohr Abbey, Kelheim received borough rights in 1151.

G. Schneider & Sohn has a large weissbier brewery in the city.

== Culture and sights ==
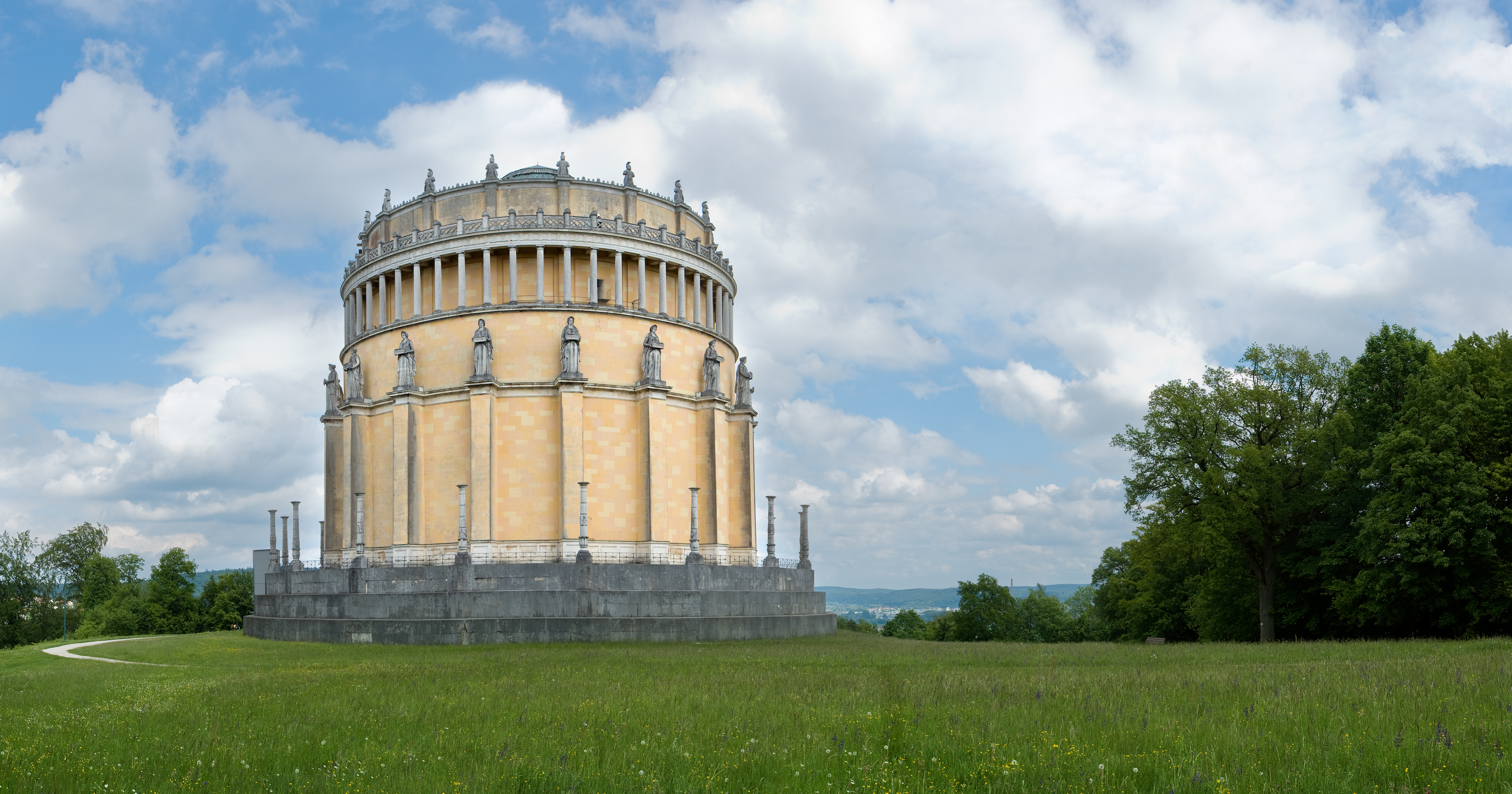
The Hall of Liberation

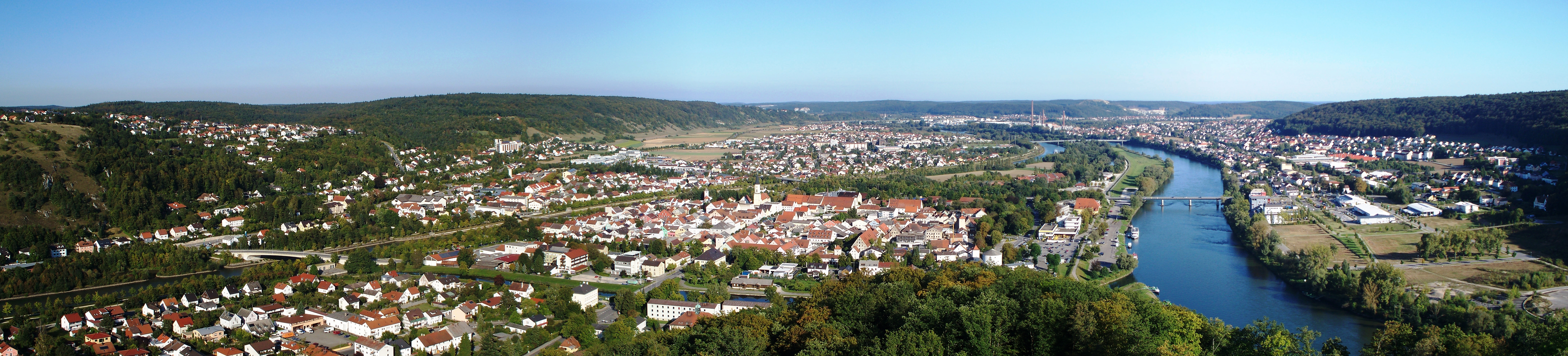
Panorama of Kelheim as viewed from the Hall of Liberation looking eastwards (direction Regensburg). To the left, slopes of the Franconian Jura; to the right the Lower Bavarian Upland. Danube river in between.

- Hall of Liberation on the Michelsberg (built by Leo von Klenze)
- Danube Gorge and Weltenburg Abbey, Wipfelsfurt valley, and Klösterl (Trauntal monastery)
- Kelheim is the home of the G. Schneider & Sohn brewing company.

== Born in Kelheim ==
- Otto I, Duke of Bavaria (c. 1117-1183), Duke of Bavaria
- Louis I, Duke of Bavaria (1173-1231), Duke of Bavaria
- Otto II, Duke of Bavaria (1206-1253), Duke of Bavaria
- Albert II, Duke of Bavaria (1368-1397), Governor in the Lower Bavaria part of the duchy of Bavaria
- Friedrich L. Bauer (1924-2015), pioneer of computer science
- Wolfgang A. Herrmann (* 1948), chemist and president emeritus of Technical University of Munich (TUM)
- Fritz Fischer (* 1956), a former biathlete
- Matthias Hanke (* 1965), cellist and arpeggione player
- Florian Herrmann (* 1971), lawyer and politician
- Stephan Ebn (* 1978), drummer and music producer
- Thomas Paulus (* 1982), footballer
- Philipp Heerwagen (* 1983), football goalkeeper
- Daniel Brodmeier (* 1987), sportsman
- Tim Pollmann (* 1990), footballer
