= Treaty of Bogenhausen =

1805 treaty between Bavaria and France

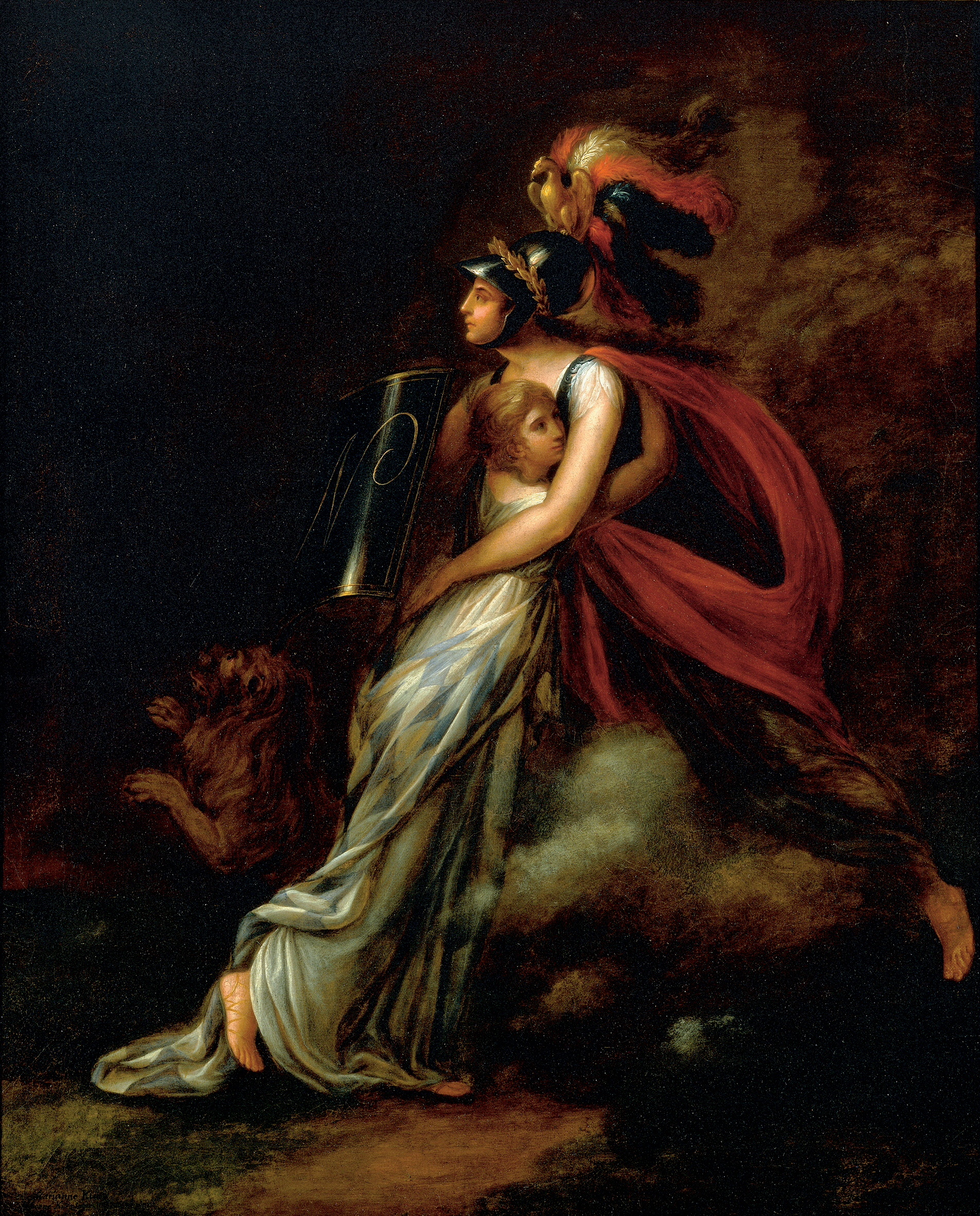
Gallia Protects Bavaria by Marianne Kürzinger, 1805. An allegorical artwork portraying the alliance

The Treaty of Bogenhausen was a diplomatic agreement between Napoleon's French Empire and the Electorate of Bavaria. It was signed on 25 August 1805 at the Fleischerschlösschen in Bogenhausen, now in the city of Munich. Maximilian von Montgelas acting on behalf Maximilian I represented Bavaria. Negotitations had been ongoing for four months with the French Ambassador Louis-Guillaume Otto, who received instructions from Talleyrand and Napoleon not to accept neutrality. Bavaria, which had previously fought alongside Austria against France during the wars of the First Coalition and Second Coalition, now committed itself to support France in any future war. France in turn guaranteed 110,000 men of the Grande Armée to protect Bavaria against Austria.

Bavarian troops took part in the War of the Third Coalition later in 1805. Bavaria did well from the alliance, gaining territories and being elevated to a kingdom as one of the founder members of the Confederation of the Rhine. Bavarian troops took part in the defeat of Austria in 1809 and the disastrous invasion of Russia in 1812. In October 1813 Bavaria signed the Treaty of Ried changing sides and declaring war on France shortly before the decisive Battle of Leipzig.

== Bibliography ==
- Baker, Irene Elizabeth. The Napoleonic System in Bavaria, 1799-1813. University of Wisconsin-Madison, 1928.
- Forrest, Alan & Wilson, Peter H. (ed.) The Bee and the Eagle: Napoleonic France and the End of the Holy Roman Empire, 1806. Springer, 2008.
- Junkelmann, Marcus. Montgelas: "Der fähigste Staatsmann, der jemals die Geschicke Bayerns geleitet hat". Verlag Friedrich Pustet, 2015.
- Prutsch, Marcus J. Making Sense of Constitutional Monarchism in Post-Napoleonic France and Germany. Springer, 2012.
- Schneid, Frederick C. Napoleon's Conquest of Europe: The War of the Third Coalition. Bloomsbury Publishing, 2005.
