= Gallia Protects Bavaria =

Painting by Marianne Kürzinger

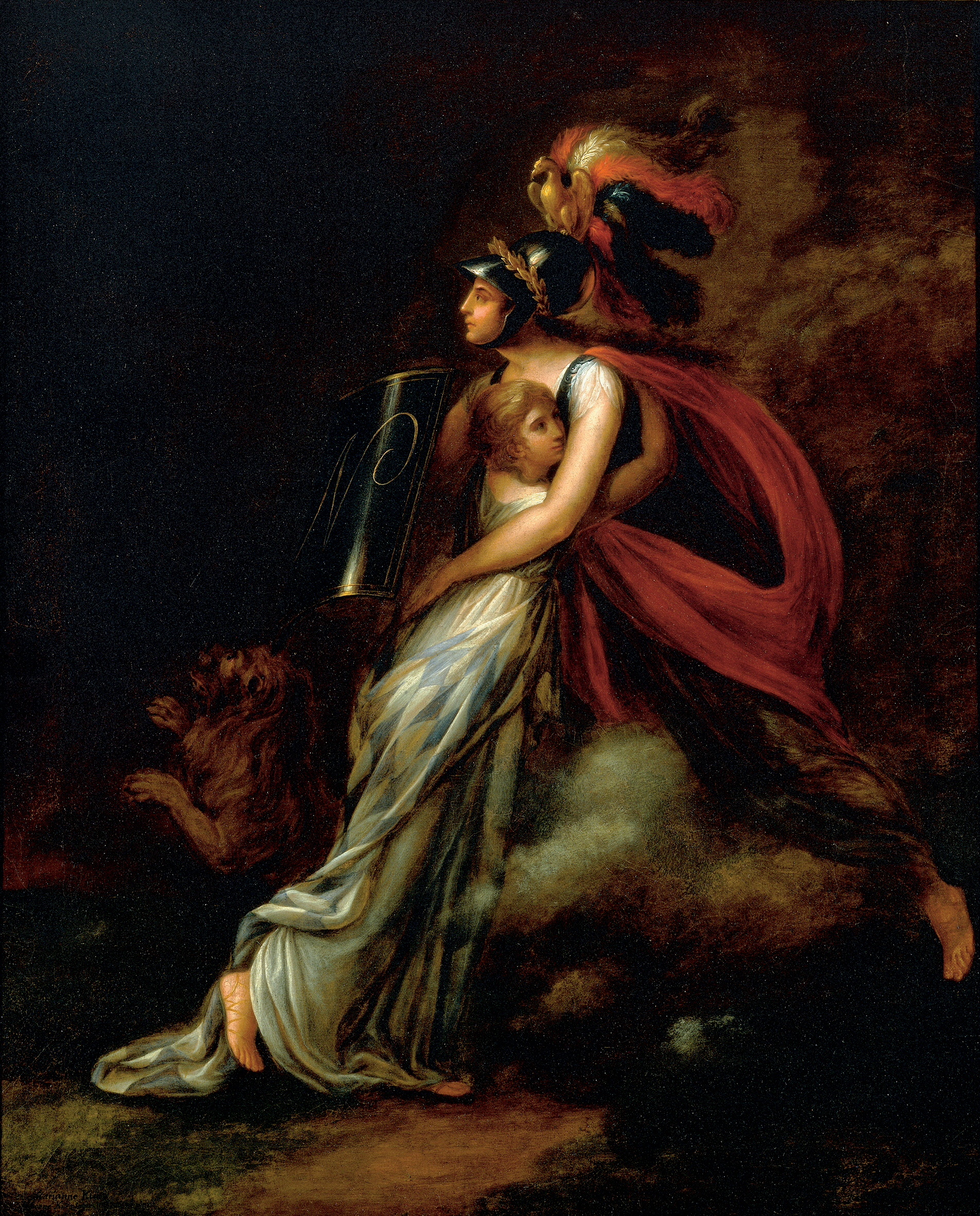
- Artist: Marianne Kürzinger
- Year: 1805
- Type: Oil on canvas
- Dimensions: 71.5 cm × 58.5 cm (28.1 in × 23.0 in)
- Location: Bavarian Palace Department; Munich

Gallia Protects Bavaria (German: Gallia schützt Bavaria) is an 1805 oil painting by the German artist Marianne Kürzinger. An allegory, it represents Bavaria the female symbol of the German land Bavaria being embraced and protected by the larger Gallia symbolising the France. It was produced in the context of the Treaty of Bogenhausen which allied the Elector of Bavaria to Napoleon's French Empire during the Napoleonic Wars. Bavaria would be elevated to a kingdom and gain territory at the expense of Austria. Eight years later Bavaria would notably changed sides shortly before the decisive Battle of Leipzig. Kürzinger was a Munich-based history painter. She depicts Gallia wearing the helmet of Athena and carries a shield bearing Napoleon's monogram while Bavaria wears the traditional blue and white colours.

== Bibliography ==
- Henker, Michael. Bavaria, Germania, Europa. Pustet, 2000.
- Schmid, Alois & Weigand, Katharina. Bayern mitten in Europa: von Frühmittelalter bis ins 20. Jahrhundert. C.H.Beck, 2005.
