= Maximilian von Montgelas =

Bavarian statesman (1759–1838)

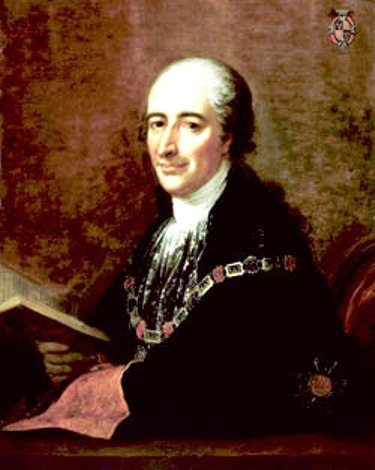
- Portrait by Joseph Hauber (1806)

Minister of the Royal House and of Foreign Affairs of Bavaria
- In office 1799–1817
- Monarch: Maximilian Joseph
- Preceded by: Count Matthäus von Vieregg
- Succeeded by: Count Heinrich Aloys von Reigersberg

Personal details
- Born: Maximilian Karl Joseph Franz de Paula Hieronymus de Garnerin de la Thuille Freiherr von Montgelas; 12 September 1759 Munich, Electorate of Bavaria, Holy Roman Empire
- Died: 14 June 1838 (aged 78) Munich, Kingdom of Bavaria, German Confederation
- Spouse: Countess Ernestine von Arco
- Children: 8
- Parent(s): John Sigmund Garnerin, Baron Montgelas; Countess Ursula von Trauner

Maximilian Karl Joseph Franz de Paula Hieronymus de Garnerin de la Thuile, Count von Montgelas (German: Maximilian Karl Joseph Franz de Paula Hieronymus de Garnerin de la Thuille Graf von Montgelas; 12 September 1759 – 14 June 1838) was a Bavarian statesman, a member of a noble family from the Duchy of Savoy. His father John Sigmund Garnerin, Baron Montgelas (German: Janus Sigmund Garnerin Freiherr von Montgelas), entered the military service of Maximilian III, Elector of Bavaria, and married the Countess Ursula von Trauner. Maximilian Josef, their eldest son, was born in the Bavarian capital Munich on September 10, 1759.

== Early life ==
Montgelas was educated successively at Nancy, Strasbourg, and Ingolstadt. Being a Savoyard on his father's side, he naturally felt the French influence, which was then strong in Germany, with peculiar force. To the end of his life he spoke and wrote French more correctly and with more ease than German. Nevertheless, the Munich-born Montgelas always wanted to be addressed as a Bavarian by nationality.

In 1779 he entered the public service in the department of the censorship of books. The Elector Charles Theodore, who had at first favored him, became offended on discovering that Montgelas was associated with the Illuminati, a secret society in Bavaria that held the most anti-clerical propositions of the Enlightenment. Montgelas therefore went to Zweibrücken, where he was helped by his brother Illuminati to find employment at the Court of the Duke, the head of a branch of the Wittelsbach family. From this refuge also he was driven by orthodox enemies of the Illuminati.

The brother of the Duke of Zweibrücken, Maximilian Joseph, took Montgelas into his service as a Private Secretary. When his employer succeeded to the Duchy, Montgelas was named a Minister, and in that capacity he attended the Second Congress of Rastatt in 1798, where the reconstruction of Germany, which was the consequence of the French Revolution, was in full swing.

== Minister in Bavaria ==
In 1799, the Duke of Zweibrücken succeeded to the throne of the Electorate of Bavaria, and he kept Montgelas as his most trusted adviser. He agreed the Treaty of Bogenhausen with France in August 1805, leading Bavaria to ally with Napoleonic France in the War of the Third Coalition. Montgelas was the inspirer and director of the policy by which in 1806 the Electorate was turned into a kingdom and was also greatly increased in size by the annexation of church lands, free towns, and small lordships, such as Wallerstein. As this end was achieved by undeviating servility to Napoleon, and by the most cynical disregard of the rights of Bavaria's German-speaking neighbors, Montgelas became the type of an unpatriotic politician in the eyes of all Germans who revolted against the supremacy of France. From his own conduct and his written defence of his policy, it is clear that such sentiments as theirs appeared to Montgelas to be merely childish.

Montgelas often espoused that Bavaria had always been threatened by the Habsburg monarchy, had received Prussian support for their personal gain, and could stand against both only with aid from France, as the latter wished for their own benefit wished to counterbalance both Austrian and Prussian influence in Germany. As late as 1813, despite Napoleon's rule was visibly declining, and Montgelas recognising Bavaria's internal frailty empire from visiting Paris, he persisted in his conviction French support was lucrative to Bavaria.

The decision of the king to turn against Napoleon in 1814 was taken under the influence of his son and of Marshal Wrede rather than of Montgelas, although the minister would not have been influenced by any feeling of sentimentality to adhere to an ally who had ceased to be useful. In internal affairs, Montgelas carried out a policy of secularization and of administrative centralization by determined means, which showed that he had never wholly renounced his opinions of the time of the Enlightenment movement.

In the field in interior politics he can be regarded as the most successful German politician of the early 19th century with a long list of achievements. Already in 1796, when the Duke of Zweibrücken (after the French advance towards Zweibrücken) was a landless prince exiled in Ansbach, Montgelas had developed a masterplan for the future modernisation of Bavaria. This lengthy paper, the "Ansbacher mémoire" was rediscovered in the 1960s and published in 1970 by the Bavarian historian Eberhard Weis, who also is Montgelas' biographer. After 1799 when Maximilian Joseph succeeded to the Electorate of Bavaria, Montgelas as his primary adviser and leading statesman very much followed his concept throughout the following years in a very uncompromising manner:

Montgelas enforced the taxation of the nobility and the clergy. Taxation went along with a complete economic description and measurement of Bavaria leading to an outstanding cadastral system. Montgelas passed the first modern constitution for Bavaria in 1808, which included the abolition of any relics of serfdom that had survived until then. Montgelas was responsible for the abolition of the torture in 1812 by introducing a new penal code based on contemporary humanitarian standards. He introduced compulsory school education, compulsory military service, compulsory vaccination. He reorganised the Bavarian administration by a centralised cabinet of modern ministries instead of a multitude of chambers. Montgelas was also responsible for the abolition of all tolls within the Kingdom of Bavaria thus enabling free trade within the country. And he designed and passed a regulation for civil servants, the "Dienstpragmatik", which became a model for civil service in Germany as whole. According to its rules, admission to any service within the public administration was no longer dependent on whether one was Catholic or of noble family, but solely on the quality of one's education. Thus Montgelas broke the preponderance of the nobility in the higher and decisive ranks of public administration. Civil servants were granted a sufficient salary and their widows a pension. Thus Montgelas refounded the civil service on new ethics and created a social group of servants loyal only to the crown and Kingdom of Bavaria.

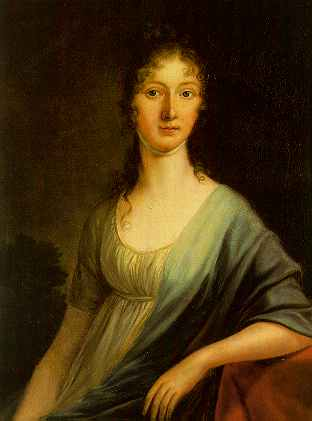
Portrait of Countess Ernestine von Arco

In order to reduce the political and cultural influence of the Catholic Church in Bavaria in favor of the secular state, Montgelas extended civil rights, including citizenship, to Protestants. The Jewish communities were awarded a secure legal status, although there remained a discriminating special registration.

Along these lines, Montgelas secularized—that is seized for the use and benefit of the State—many Catholic land-holdings, most especially the Bavarian monasteries. Montgelas was attempting to sever the Mortmain that had driven the state of the treasury to the brink of financial ruin under Karl Theodor. According to principles of the Enlightenment and the Napoleonic reorganization of Europe, the expropriation of Church property and the suppression of Church institutions were essential steps to the modernization of the State. Since the earliest centuries of the Middle Ages, the monasteries had owned large stretches of land and governed the farmers working that land. Montgelas, again in keeping with principles of the Enlightenment and the Napoleonic reorganization of Europe that favored the establishment of absolute secular authority over against religion, eliminating such exercises of authority by and resources from church institutions was necessary. Monastic life as such was viewed by Montgelas, in keeping with the most religiously hostile forms of Enlightenment thinking, as useless, at best, and as a breeding ground of "superstition."

In Montgelas's eyes, any form of parliamentary representation was as dangerous to the modern state as was the Church. Even the powerless and highly plutocratic Parliament introduced by the constitution of 1808 practically never came into being. Montgelas himself declared, that the repeated wars prevented any convocation of the Parliament. In fact he preferred his status as a benevolent dictator and successfully evaded any control by any form of Parliament. Only after Montgelas' dismissal in 1817, the Bavarian constitution of 1818 second introduced a real bicameral Parliament (to the standards of the era).

His enemies persuaded the king to dismiss him in 1817, and he spent the remainder of his life as a member of the Bavarian House of Lords ("Kammer der Reichsräte") till his death in 1838.

He had married the Countess von Arco in 1803, and had eight children; in 1809 he was made a count.

== Honors ==
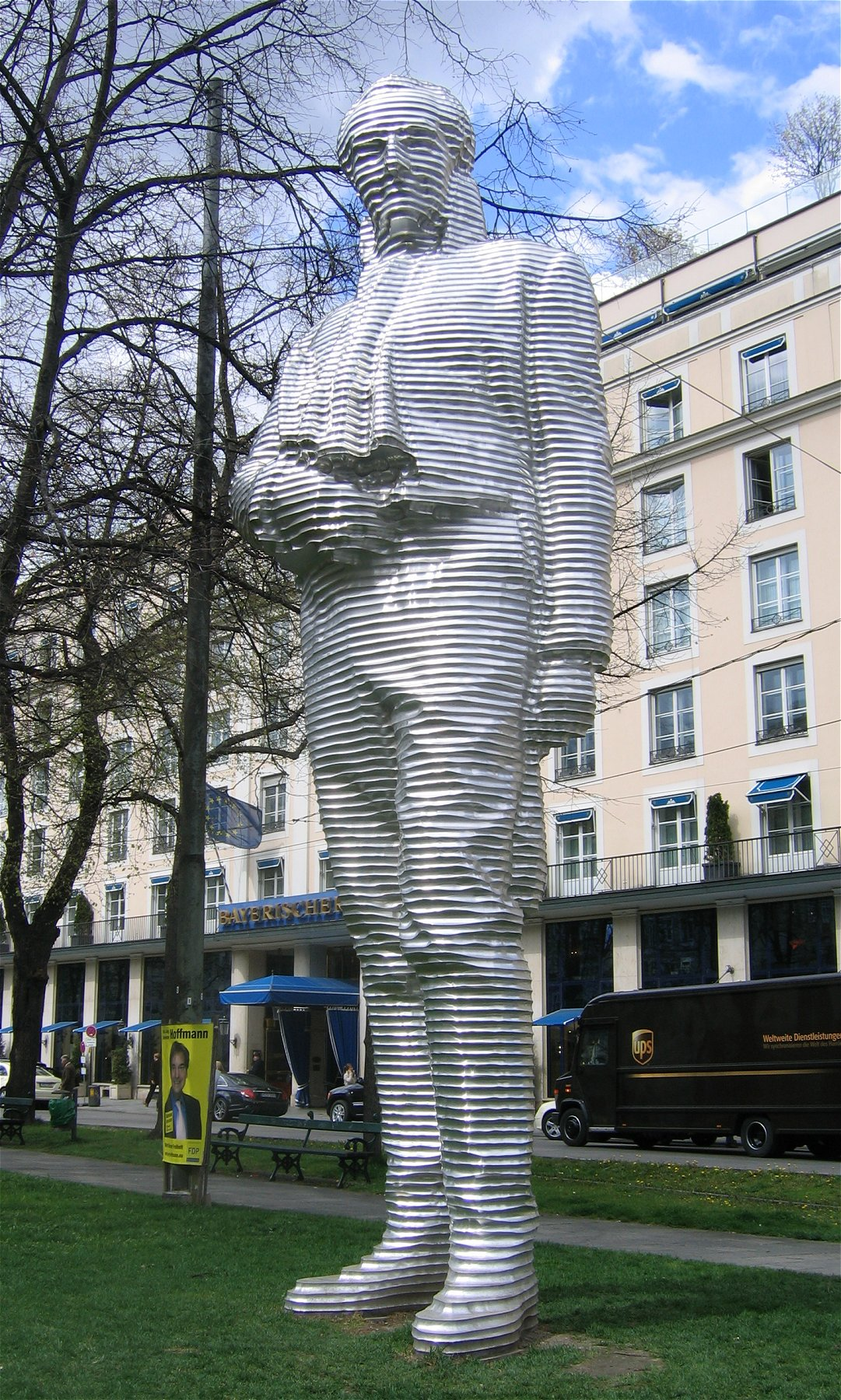
Aluminium statue at the Promenadeplatz, Munich by Karin Sander (2005)

In 2005 the Free State of Bavaria and the city of Munich erected a monument at Munich's Promenadenplatz in his honor.

In 2009, his 250th birth anniversary has been celebrated with the creation of honorific "Montgelas Prize" ("Montgelas-Preis" in German), awarded each year to French leaders to acknowledge their actions in favor of French-German cooperation. It has been awarded to Jean Arthuis (Head of the Committee on Budgets in the European parliament), Philippe Richert (President of the Regional Council of Alsace) and Thierry Breton (CEO of Atos and former Minister of the Economy).

== Biography ==
- Eberhard Weis: Montgelas - Zwischen Revolution und Reform 1759–1799, München, Beck Verlag, 2nd edition, 1988, ISBN 3-406-32974-8
- Eberhard Weis: Montgelas - Der Architekt des modernen bayerischen Staates 1799–1838, München, Beck Verlag 2005, ISBN 3-406-03567-1

== See also ==
- History of Bavaria
- List of minister-presidents of Bavaria
- Ludwig I of Bavaria

Preceded by Count Matthäus von Vieregg	Prime Minister of Bavaria; 1799 – 1817	Succeeded by Count Heinrich Aloys von Reigersberg
