= Marianne Kürzinger =

German painter

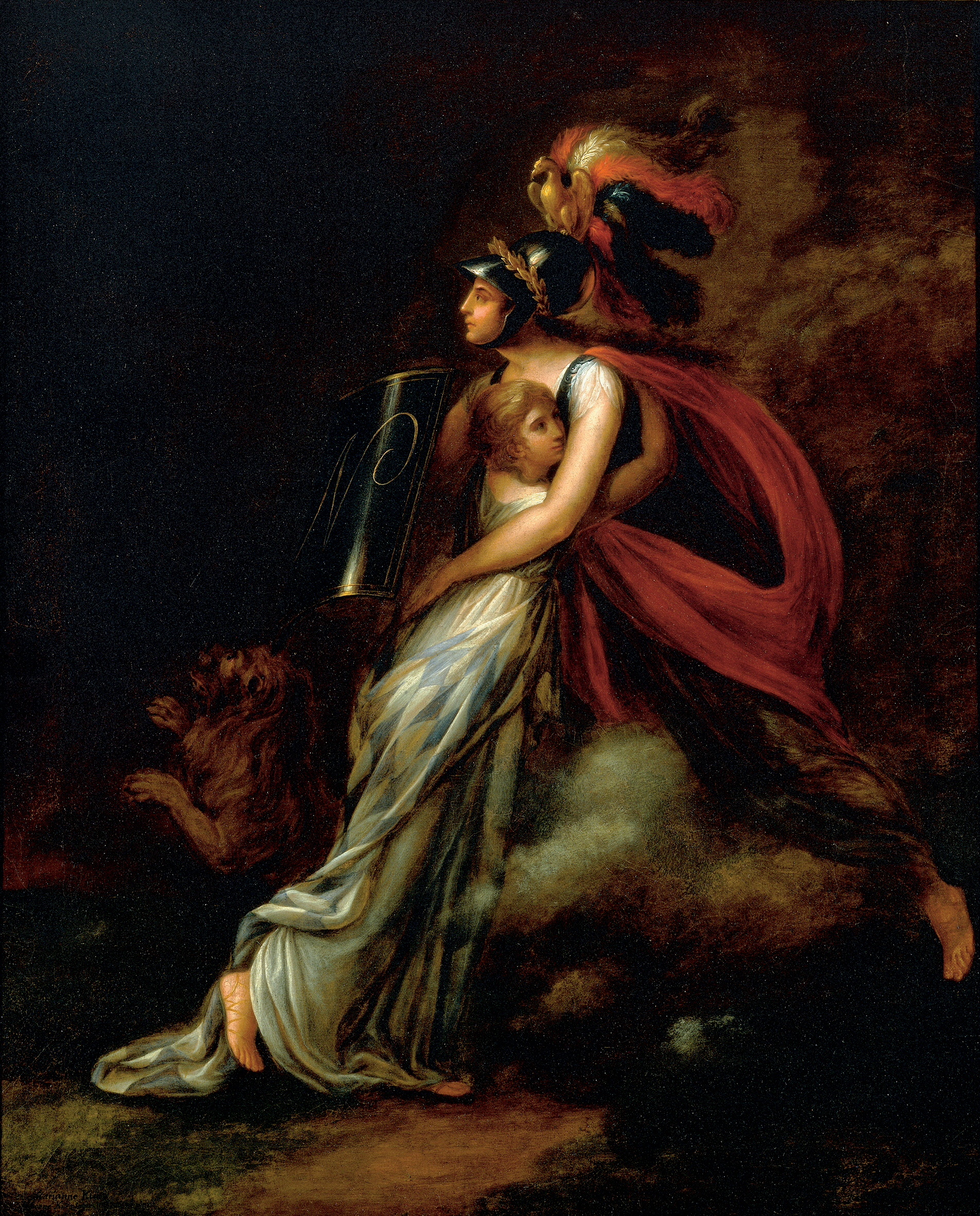
Gallia Protects Bavaria (1805), an allegory symbolising the alliance between Napoleonic France and Bavaria

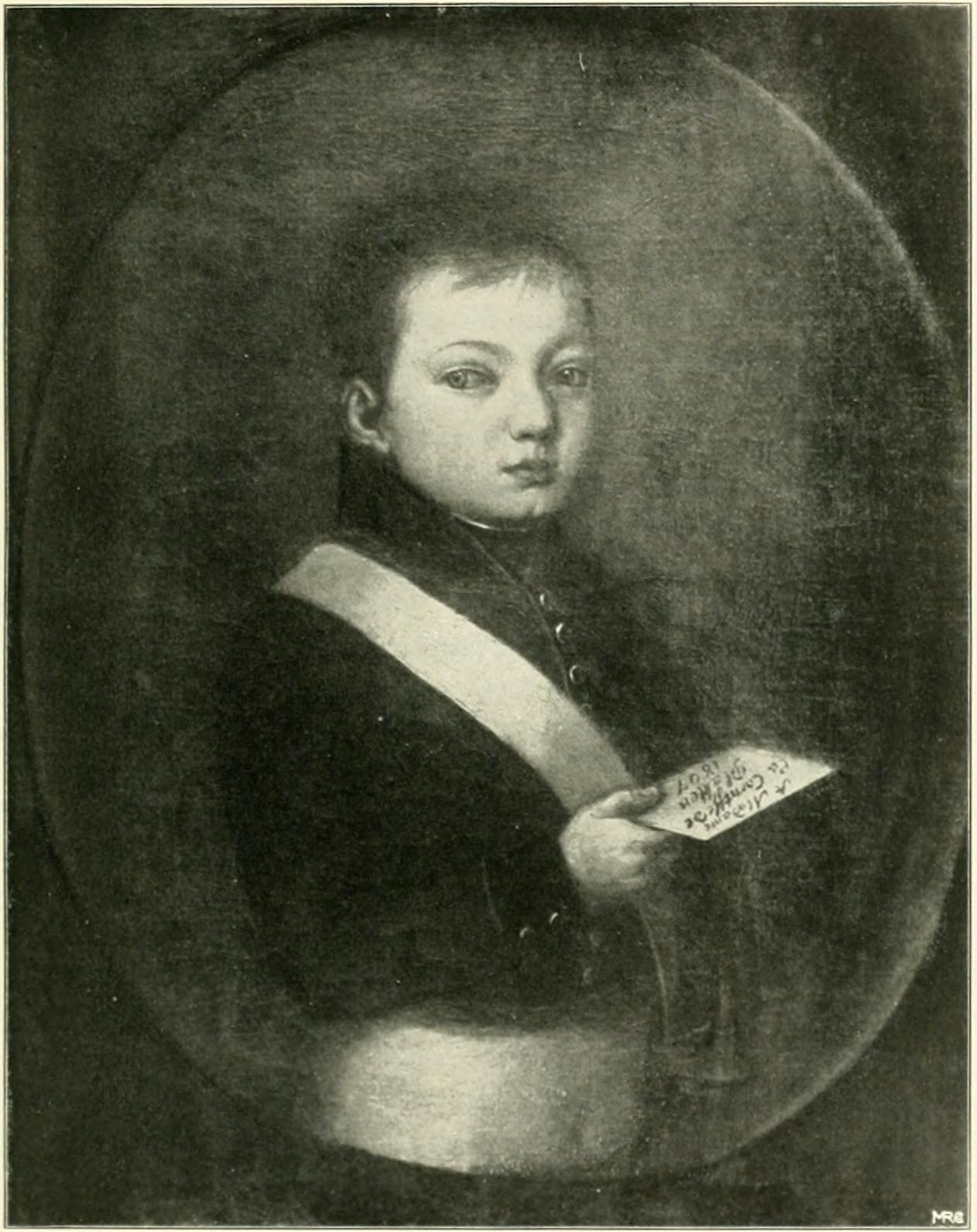
August von Platen-Hallermünde

Marianne Kürzinger (1766 or 1767 – 1809) was a German history and genre painter. In later life, she specialized in painting allegorical representations of Bavarian events of the times.

== Biography ==
Kürzinger was born in Munich. She was the daughter and pupil of the painter Franz Kürzinger (1730–1790) who had studied in Rome under Anton Raphael Mengs and Agostino Masucci. She was further instructed by Johann Jakob Dorner the Elder. By 1786, her earliest paintings had been recognized as displaying a "delicate sense of expression so typical of her gender". She exhibited at Dorner's first Munich Art Exhibitions in 1788 and 1789. For her sentimental depiction of Artemisia at her husband's grave, she was nicknamed "the Bavarian Angelica Kauffmann". Kauffman was an Austrian-born artist who became a leading painter in Britain. In 1791, Kürzinger married the actor and tenor singer Johann Kunz of Munich who died in 1795.

She spent the rest of her life as a widow in Munich, painting mainly history paintings and portraits. She specialized in allegorical depictions of events of the times such as the Arrival of Max Joseph in Munich (1799) or Death of the first French Grenadier, La Tour d'Auvergne, at Neuburg am Donau (1800). Her best known painting is probably Gallia schützt Bavaria (Gallia Protects Bavaria, 1805), an allegorical representation of the political situation in Bavaria. Little Bavaria in a white and blue robe is thrust against the chest of the larger armed Gallia bearing Napoleon's initial on the shield and the imperial eagle and tricolor feathers on the helmet.

Marianne Kürzinger died on 29 March 1809 in Munich. Her best paintings include:

- A Circassian Girl brought before the Sultan
- Circassian Girl dressed by a Woman
- Death of the first French Grenadier, La Tour d'Auvergne
- Christ on the Mount of Olives

== Bibliography ==
- Bryan, Michael (1904). Bryan's Dictionary of Painters and Engravers. Macmillan.
