= Ensisheim =

Commune in Grand Est, France

Ensisheim Ansa
- Commune
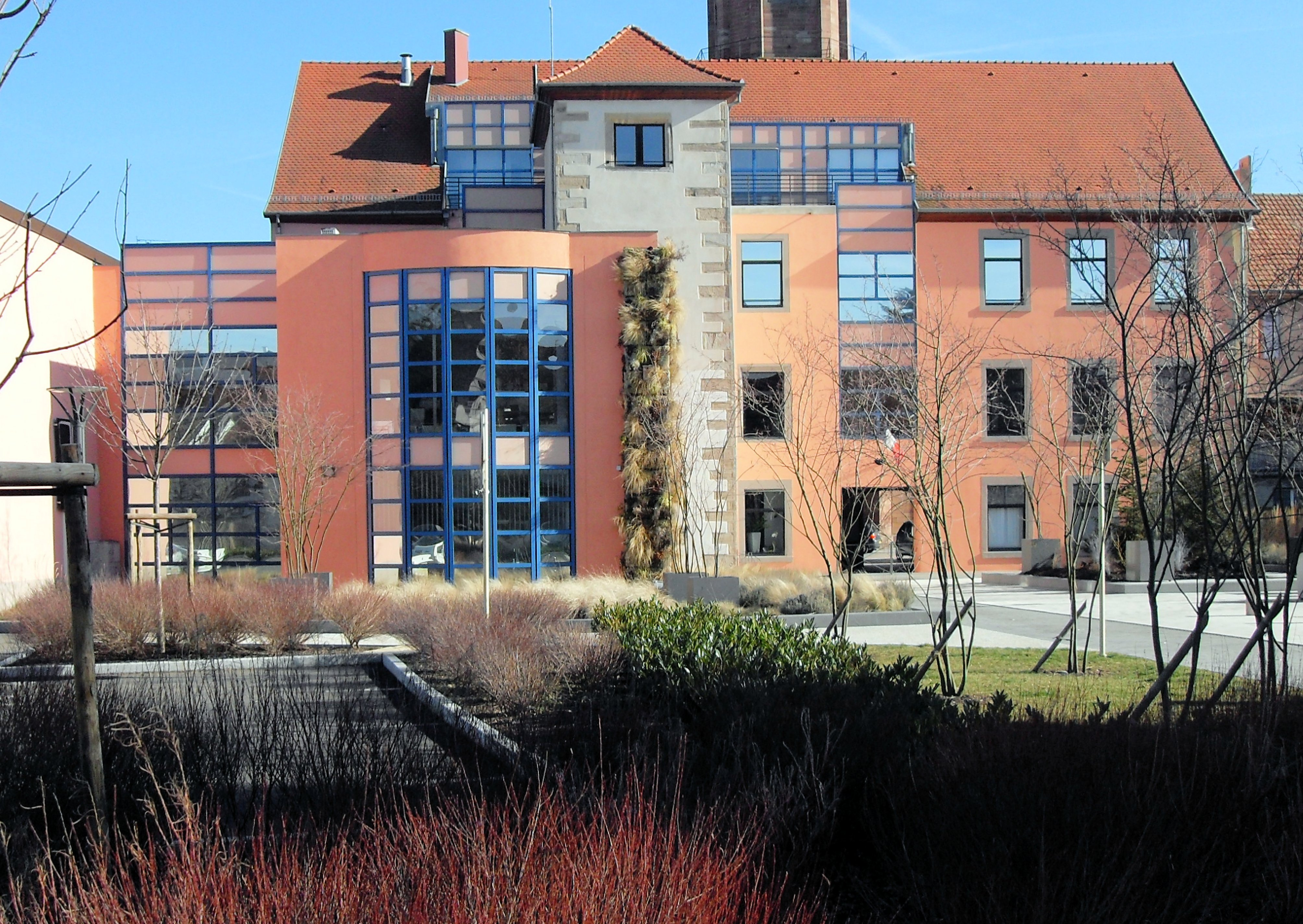
- The western side of the town hall

- Coat of arms
- Location of Ensisheim
- Location within France Location within Grand Est
- Coordinates: 47°51′59″N 7°21′11″E
- Country: France
- Region: Grand Est
- Department: Haut-Rhin
- Arrondissement: Thann-Guebwiller
- Canton: Ensisheim
- Intercommunality: Centre Haut-Rhin

Government
  - Mayor (2020–2026): Michel Habig
- Area^{1}: 36.59 km^{2} (14.13 sq mi)
- Elevation: 217 m (712 ft)
- Highest elevation: 231 m (758 ft)
- Lowest elevation: 213 m (699 ft)
- Population (2023): 7,306
  - Density: 199.7/km^{2} (517.1/sq mi)
- Time zone: UTC+01:00 (CET)
  - Summer (DST): UTC+02:00 (CEST)
- INSEE/Postal code: 68082 /68190
- ^{1} French Land Register data, which excludes lakes, ponds, glaciers > 1 km^{2} (0.386 sq mi or 247 acres) and river estuaries.

Ensisheim (French pronunciation: [ɛnsisaim]; in Alsatian Ansa (Alemannic German pronunciation: [ˈansa])) is a commune in the Haut-Rhin department in Grand Est in north-eastern France. It is also the birthplace of the composer Léon Boëllmann. The Germanic origins of the village's name reflect the area's history.

Among the earliest-known clear examples for the practice of trepanation was identified from a Neolithic burial site near the town. Researchers from Freiburg University reported in 1997 an analysis of the well-preserved skeletal remains of an approximately 50-year-old man, whose cranium showed clear evidence of two trepanation procedures. One had fully healed and the other partially so, indicating the subject had survived the operations. The remains were dated to between 5100 and 4900 BC.

On 7 November 1492, a 127 kilogram meteorite fell there, and since then it has attracted many meteorite enthusiasts. It was described in detail by the contemporary poet Sebastian Brant. The meteorite can still be seen in the town's museum, the Musée de la Régence.

== History ==
In the remotest times of the Early Neolithic, made during the first migration are wares of the Corded Ware culture from Central Europe. The highly thatched roof-wigs of the large Dannbian Farms of "les Octrois" and "Radfeld" were already in evidence. The archeological excavations of these Corded Ware objects confirm a continuous human occupation from the prehistoric period to Carolingian agglomeration which developed in the Dannbian Killocks of "les Octrois". However, the origins of Ensisheim still remain rather vague. In 768, the village is mentioned as Enghisehaim.

During the second half of the 13th Century, Rudolph I of Germany, later King of the Romans, built a castle in Ensisheim which came to be known as the Königsburg. This fortress probably involved the displacement of the primitive village. Rabbi Meir of Rothenburg was held captive in that castle for seven years up to his death in 1293. In 1431, Sigismund, Holy Roman Emperor, established in Ensisheim the seat of the Austrian Regency and made the city the capital of his possessions in High Alsace, Country of Bade and north of Switzerland.

On 28 October 1444, the Pact of Ensisheim to the Battle of St. Jakob an der Birs was famously signed in Ensisheim by the Confederation, Zurich and the French Mercenaries.

When on 7 November 1492, the 250-pound Ensisheim meteorite fell into a field close to the town, Sebastian Brant (1458–1521), author of The Ship of Fools, took this opportunity to exert his influence on Maximilian of Austria by writing Loose Leaves Concerning the Fall of the Meteorite, which led the king to pursue a war against France. The administrative and legal functions of the city conferred her to the prosperity which reached its peak between the end of the 16th and the beginning of the 17th centuries. Ensisheim, was mostly a rural community with no more than 200 noble families.

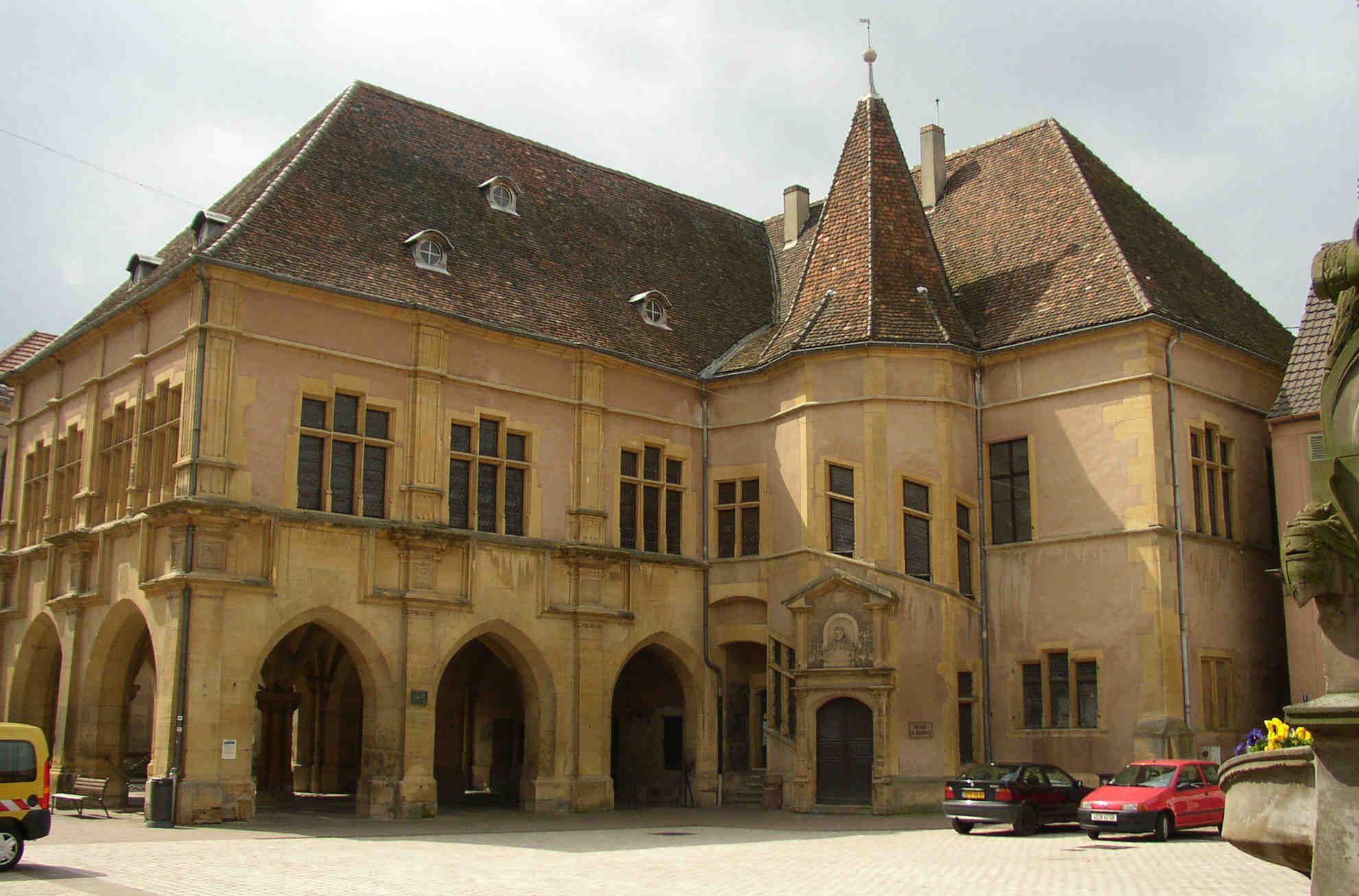
Palais de la Régence, a grand Renaissance building, now a museum.

From 1585 to 1634, the city owned a monetary workshop which became the most significant in Alsace after Strasbourg. Nevertheless, as far as the devastating shadow of the "Thirty Year War" (1618–1648) grows, Imperial Administration leave Ensisheim, in 1630. During this dreadful period which falls on Alsace, Ensisheim, will be pillaged 7 times between 1631 and 1638. The tragic consequence of this war would cause the ruin and the decline of the city.

In 1648, after the Peace of Westphalia, the Habsburg possessions were transferred to the French Crown which ran them by creating a Royal Chamber, then in 1662, the Provincial Council. By that time, Ensisheim was known again as the French province of Alsace, even though this function would be brief. When the imperial troops returned in 1674, the Provincial Council retired in Breisach. The city would be definitely taken again the following year by Marshall Turenne and a castle would be raised on the grounds in 1682. The departure of the Sovereign Council resulted in the erase of Ensisheim. Now considered as a simple chief town of bailliage until the revolution. At the end of the Empire, the city was once again be occupied between 1814 and 1820 by the Cossacks and the Austrians. At the beginning of the 20th century, the development of the extraction of potash led to a new rise for the city of Ensisheim, which still underwent much devastation during World War II. Nowadays, Ensisheim, is a rather significant demographic and economic centre.

== Population ==
Historical population
Year	Pop.	±% p.a.
1968	5,211	—
1975	5,685	+1.25%
1982	5,780	+0.24%
1990	6,164	+0.81%
1999	6,640	+0.83%
2007	6,967	+0.60%
2012	7,336	+1.04%
2017	7,508	+0.46%
2023	7,306	−0.45%
Source: INSEE

== Sister cities ==
Ensisheim has three twin towns:

- Markdorf, Germany
- (United States) Castroville, Texas, USA
- Otjiwarongo, Namibia

It is also a member of the Communauté de communes du Centre Haut-Rhin and of the Pays Rhin-Vignoble-Grand Ballon.

== See also ==
- Communes of the Haut-Rhin département
