= D'Affry =

d'Affry is a surname of a noble family, the House of Affry, of the Swiss canton of Fribourg. It may refer to:

- Adèle d'Affry (1836–1879), Swiss artist and sculptor
- Charles Philippe d'Affry (1772–1818), Swiss colonel
- Franz d'Affry (1667–1734), Swiss lieutenant general
- Louis-Auguste-Augustin d'Affry (1713–1793), Swiss military officer and diplomat
- Louis d'Affry (1743–1810), Swiss field marshal and diplomat
