= Pact of Ensisheim =

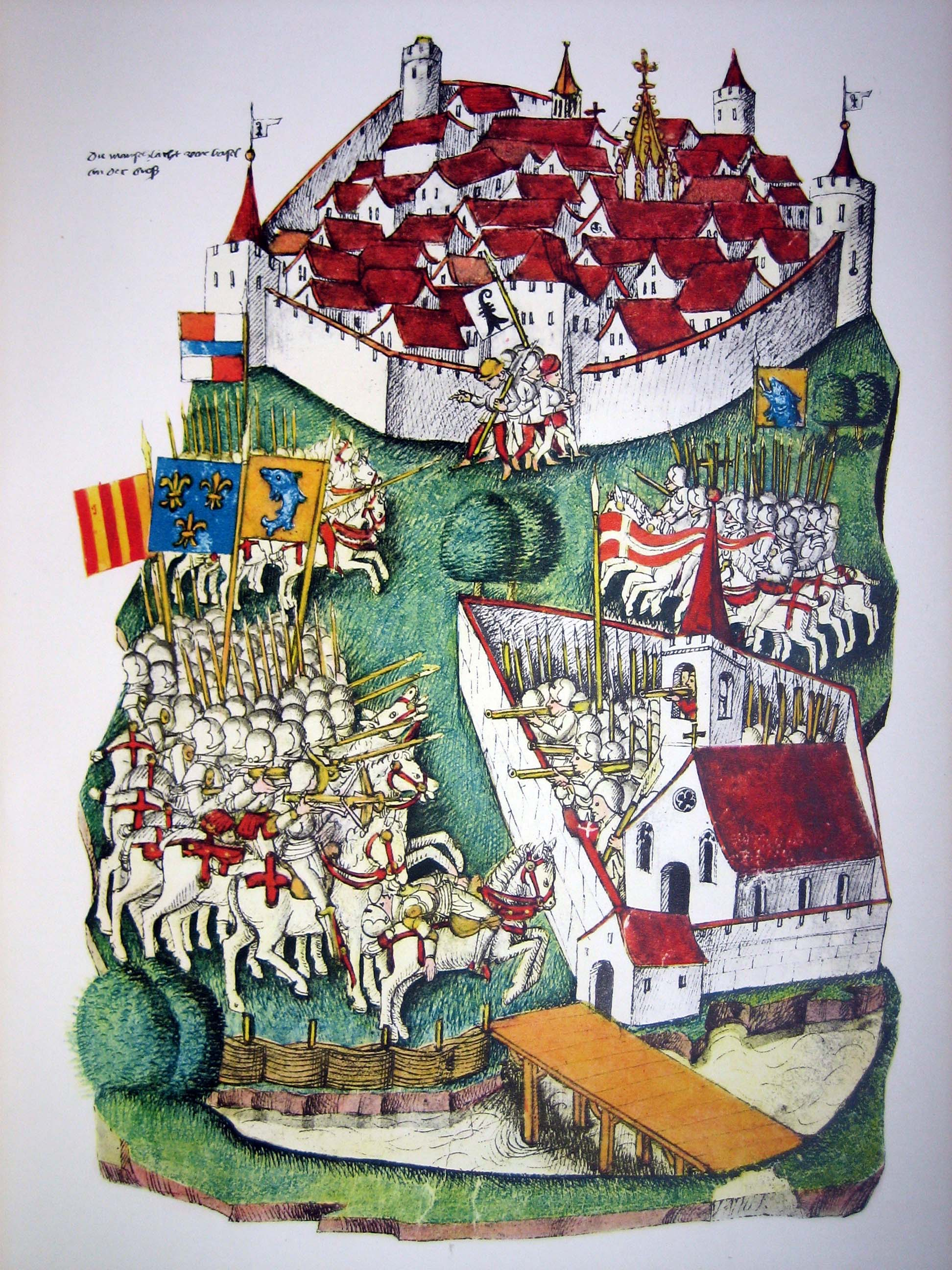
Battle of St. Jakob an der Birs

The Pact of Ensisheim is a Peace treaty signed by the Confederation of the VIII Cantons and France after the Battle of St. Jakob an der Birs. It was signed on 28 October 1444 in Ensisheim, near Basel.

== Context ==
The Battle of the Birs was fought 26 August 1444 and opposing the French Écorcheurs to the Swiss. This battle is a part of the Old Zürich War, a civil war between Zürich and the 7 other Swiss cantons : Uri, Schwyz, Nidwalden, Obwalden, Glarus, Zug and Bern.

Following these tension, the Emperor of the Holy Roman Empire, Frederick III, asks Charles VII of France to defend Zürich in his place. France, having made a truce with England in the Hundred Years' War, had many unemployed soldiers whom he sends to Switzerland. Charles VII sends his son, Louis the Dauphin of the Viennois. Their aim is to assure their suzerainty on the towns of Alsace and Switzerland. The Swiss, with only 1,300 men, against 15,000 Écorcheurs at the beginning of the battle, were vanquished. However, thanks to their bravery and willingness to protect their country, they win the respect of the Dauphin.

== Treaty ==
The Dauphin of France decides to create an alliance, favourizing peace. He decides to stop any hostility and make a treaty between France and the Confederates. This treaty contains four main points, guaranteeing said peace:

- security of the Swiss on French land
- free passage of Council members and merchants of both parties
- obligation to end hostility
- promise to help create peace between Austria, Zürich and the Confederates.

The French mercenaries didn't leave the country until the spring of 1445

== Consequences ==
Finally, the Swiss keep the land of Saint-Jaques, who is symbolically more important than politically. Moreover, this treaty establishes the Pact of Einseideln, the end of the tensions between Zürich and the Confederation. This battle also improves the reputation of Switzerland in Europe, because of their defiance of the enemy, France, even with ten times less men.

== Sources ==
- Peter Dürrenmatt, Histoire illustrée de la Suisse, Payot, 1958, p. 162-163
- Johannes Dierauer, L’histoire de la Confédération suisse, vol.Tome 2, 1912, p. 117-147
