= St. Jakobs Memorial =

Monument in the city of Basel, Switzerland

Coordinates: 47°32′52″N 7°35′54″E

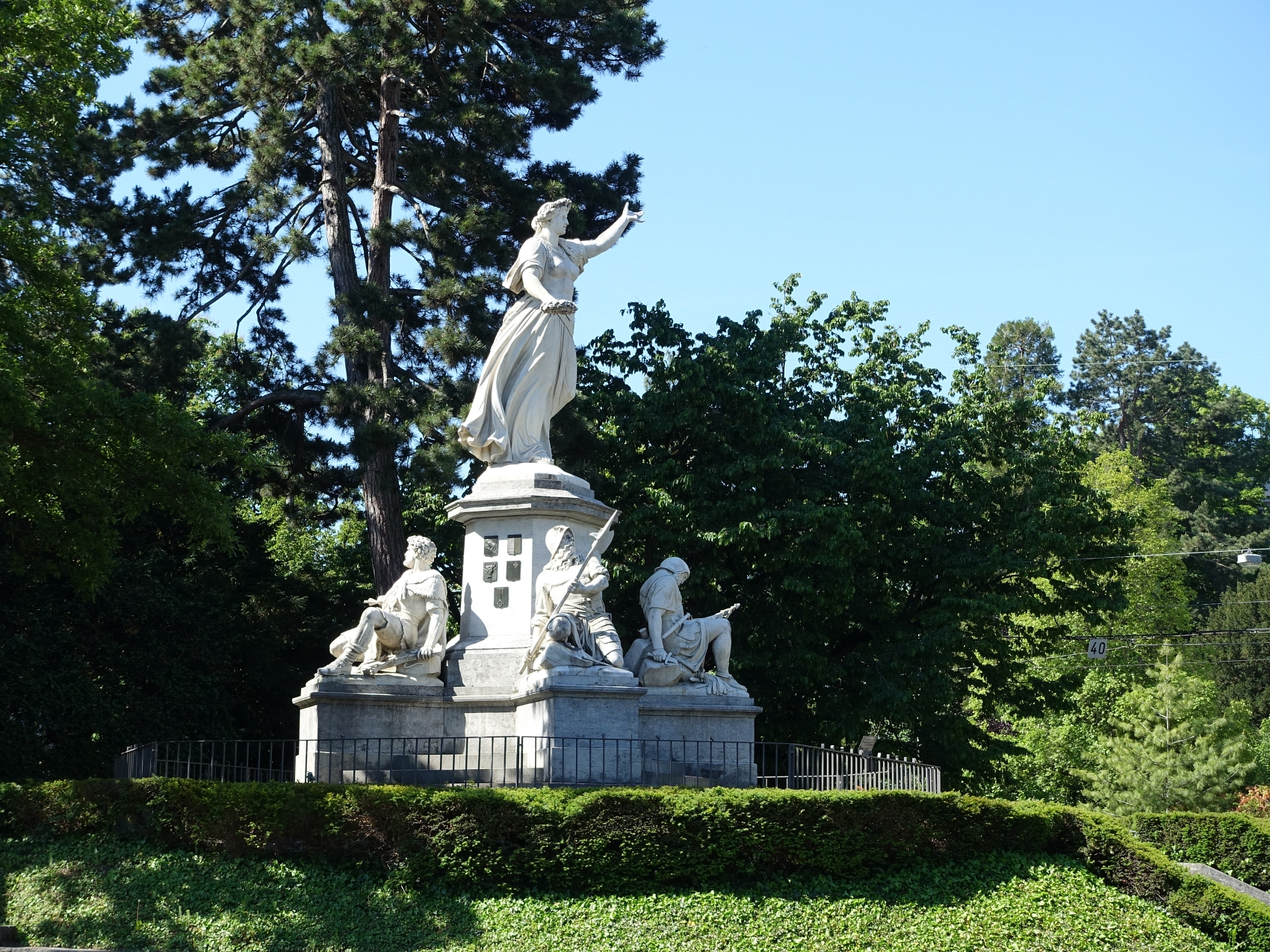
- St. Jakobs Memorial
- Artist: Ferdinand Schlöth
- Year: 1867–1872
- Movement: Classic
- Subject: Helvetia
- Location: Basel

The St. Jakobs Memorial is a statue originally erected in 1824 in the Canton Basel, Switzerland in memory of the fallen Swiss soldiers in the Battle of St.Jakob at the Birs of 1444. Due to extensive maintaining costs the government demanded the replacement of the first memorial with one built from a more durable material. In 1872, the current statue, built by the Swiss sculptor Ferdinand Schlöth was erected.

== Background ==
In the 15th century the St. Catherine's Chapel was built at the place where the current St.Jakob memorial stands, but it was demolished in 1805. The first monument to the Battle of St. Jacob at the Birs was designed by Marquard Wocher on a small hill at the fork in the road to St. Jakob and Münchenstein. The memorial was a neo-gothic 12 meter high tower sculptured out of red sandstone and had the coat of arms of the involved cantons depicted on its sides. It was inaugurated in 1824 and people would gather annually on the 26 August in memory of the battle. But the tower was in need of extensive maintaining and the city wanted to replace it with another memorial.

== Election process ==
In 1859 a commission to elect a new memorial was formed, which included the Swiss historian Jakob Burckhardt and the architect Amadeus Merian. Several local and international artists were allowed to participate in the competition which was announced in February 1860 and closed on the 8 August of the same year. 18 artworks were taken into consideration by the commission of which the models of Arnold Böcklin, Ernst Stückelberg, Franz Heinrich Baldinger and Ferdinand Schlöth were exhibited to the public. The election committee chose the model of Baldinger as the one to be realized but Government of Basel hesitated in its pledge in view of the considerable costs on 100'000 Swiss francs. It demanded that the Grand Council of Basel Stadt choose a simple monument resembling the former one, to which the Grand Council agreed on the 9 December 1861 and a new competition began. The election committee favored an architectonic memorial but also asked painters to participate in the competition, after which paintings a sculpture was to be crafted. In the new competition, sculptor Ferdinand Schlöth and the painter Arnold Böcklin were the main competitors. Schlöth invested great time into the competition, and worked on different models of Helvetia out of plaster. He focused on Helvetia as he noticed that this motive gained wide support from the public. On the 5 July 1864, the electoral commission announced that the contract to build the memorial was given to Ferdinand Schlöth. In February 1866 a model of the sculpture was erected beside the Stadtcasino in Basel, so the public could inspect it. The surrounding figures mainly gained the approval from the public but again, Schlöth received a list of deficiencies of what did not meet the expectations for the sculpture and he made adaptions to the Helvetia, which was the most criticized. The demands included that the female figure should be better perceivable through the clothing, specially in the upper body and the right leg. Initially a sculpture in bronze was planned by the electoral commission for which a budget of 90'000 Swiss francs was provided, but by August 1866 the memorial was to be sculpted in stone. Schlöth insisted that it would be Carrara marble and assured, he would deliver the memorial of one central figure and four surrounding figures for 80'000 Swiss francs. He preferred the Carrara marble to other stones due to its better workability. At the time, the nature of the Carrara marble was not known well enough used for monuments of such dimensions below the open sky. Only after the electoral commission received benevolent informations on the weather resistance of the Carrara marble from Berlin and Stuttgart, the city council approved Schlöths demand for the Carrara marble. The aim was to inaugurate the sculpture for the 425. anniversary of the Battle of St. Jakob in 1869.

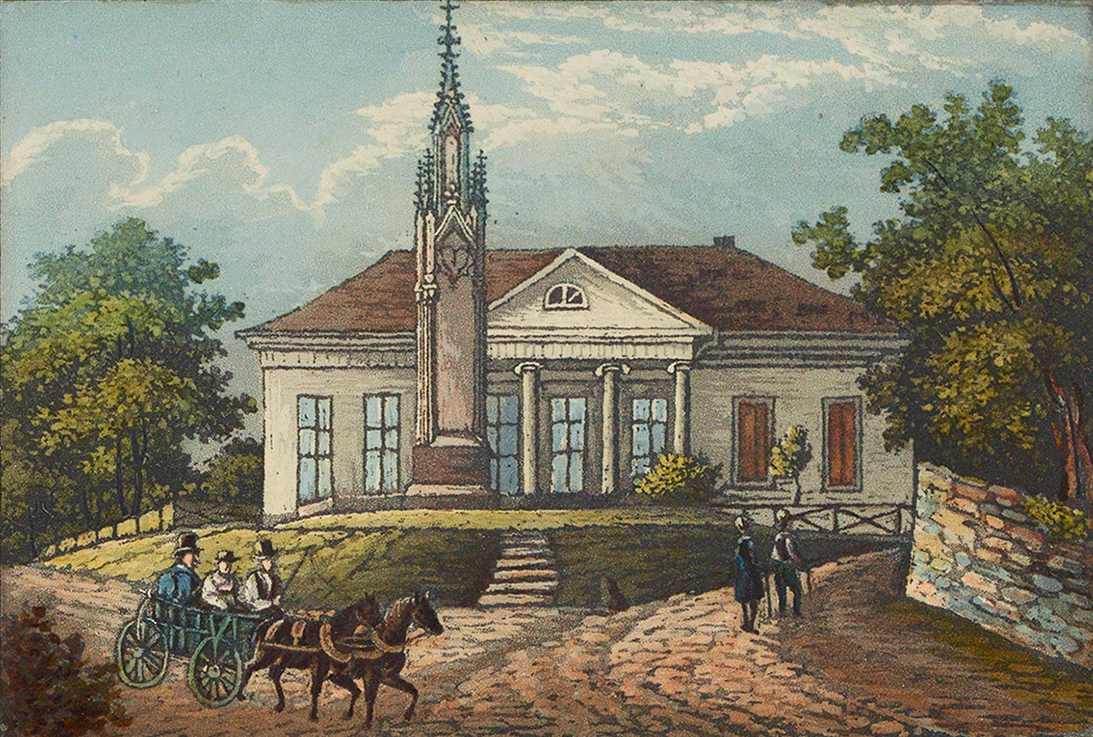
Former memorial of the Battle of St.Jakob an der Birs

== Realization of the statue ==
In 1867 Schlöth left for Rome where he had his workshop and waited for the Carrara marble to be delivered. The smaller blocks arrived in the winter months of 1867-1868, but the main block for Helvetia did still not arrive by 1869 due to which its inauguration had to be delayed. The costs of the memorial were of a considerable larger amount that expected and surpassed the 100'000 Swiss francs. As Schlöth had to endure financial hardships, the chancellor for the realization of the St.Jakob Memorial gave him a private credit for the time the city had to await the result of a fundraising campaign for the realization of the sculpture. But the work made good progress and by 1871, all five statues which comprised the memorial composition arrived in Basel.

== Realization of the pedestal ==
In Basel, a discussion about the erection place and the pedestal on which the sculpture was to be placed began. Initially it was planned that it would replace the former monument for the Battle in the fork on the street in front of the Sommercasino. But now there were several options in place. After several discussions whether the sculpture was to be erected in the right or on the left side of Rhine the government of Basel decided to erect it on the place of the former memorial, which was received with pleasure of the cantonal architect who planned to combine its erection with the amplification of the road between the Sommercasino and the Aeschensquare. About the material for the pedestal the discussion was still raging. The available options were red Granite, dark white-veined Limestone from Saint-Triphon in the Canton of Vaud and Limestone from the nearby Canton of Solothurn. After the electoral committee chose the limestone of Solothurn without a discussion with Schlöth, the sculptor reacted rather furiously, as he deemed the stone of much less quality than others as its nature is said to be at times a bit porous which was not to be seen at the raw product. But his opposition was to no avail and the city aimed to inaugurate the Memorial as soon as possible. The pedestal has the form of a cross on which's four arms the four male figures are erected while on its centerpiece stands Helvetia above the other figures.

== Inauguration ==
The monument was inaugurated on the 26 August 1872, in presence of the Federal councilors Paul Cérésole and Melchior Josef Martin Knüsel. Ferdinand Schlöth, still remembering the discussions on the quality of the pedestal, preferred not to attend the inauguration and stayed in Rome.
