= Ensisheim meteorite =

Stony meteorite which landed outside Ensisheim in present-day Alsace, France (1492)

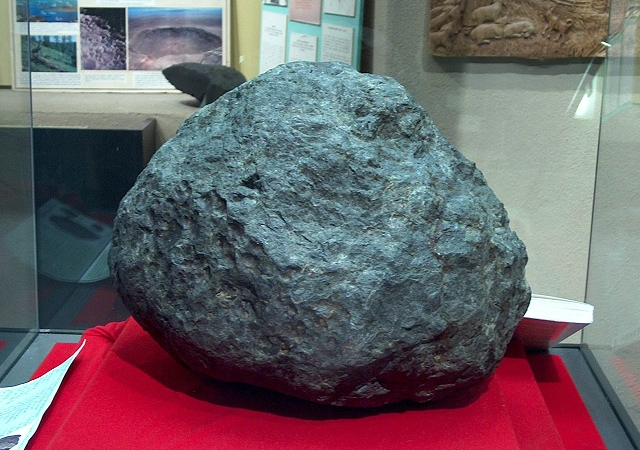
- Ensisheim meteorite in the town's museum
- Type: Chondrite
- Class: Ordinary chondrite
- Group: LL6
- Country: France
- Region: Ensisheim
- Observed fall: Yes
- Fall date: 7 November 1492
- Found date: 7 November 1492
- TKW: 127 kg (280 lb)
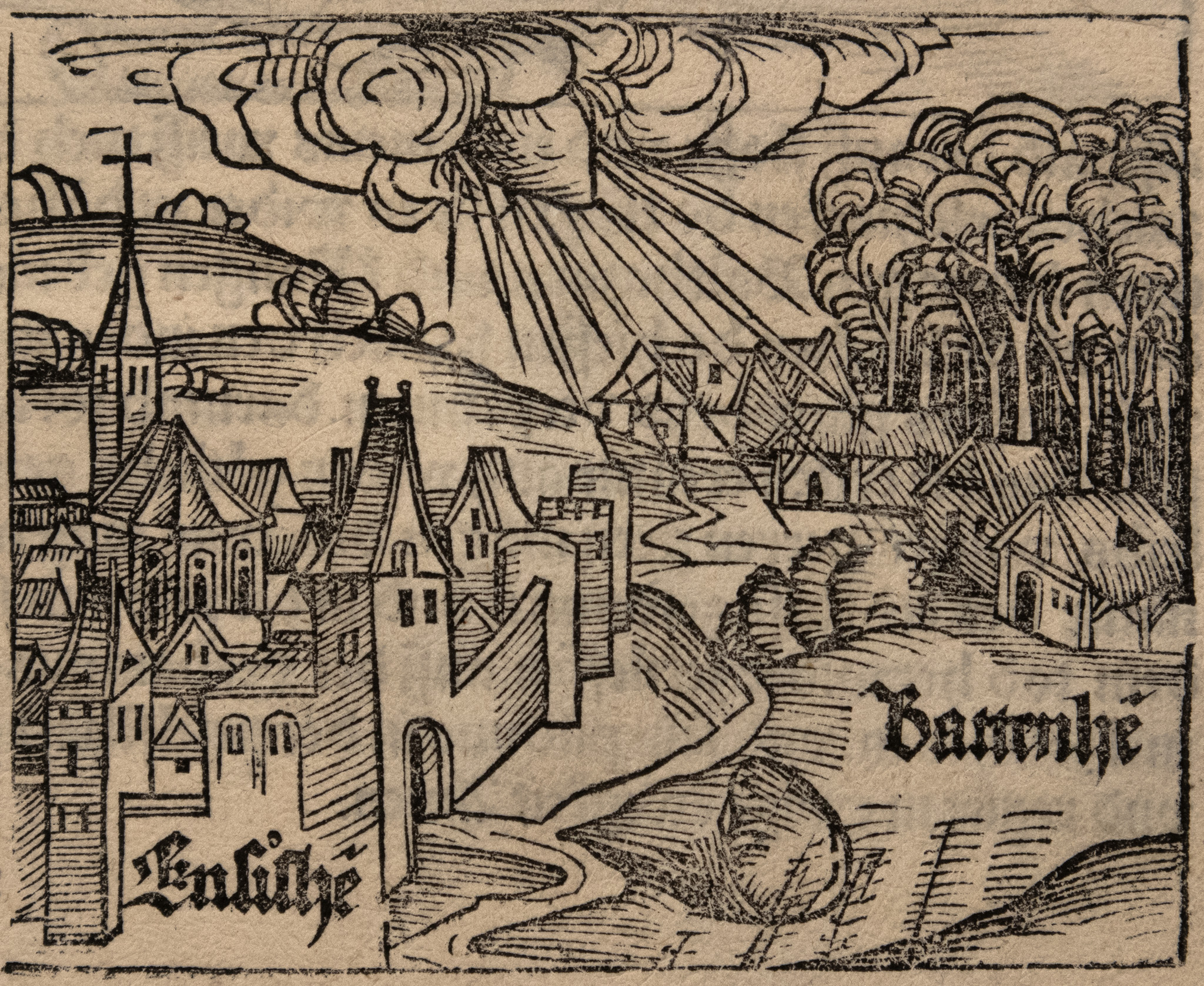
- The fall of the meteorite, as depicted in the Nuremberg Chronicle from 1493.
- Related media on Wikimedia Commons

The Ensisheim meteorite is a stony meteorite that fell on November 7, 1492, in a wheat field outside the walled town of Ensisheim in then Alsace, Further Germany (now France). The meteorite can still be seen in Ensisheim's museum, the sixteenth-century Musée de la Régence. It is the oldest recorded stony European meteorite fall from which there is still some meteoritic material preserved.

== Composition ==
The meteorite is an LL6 ordinary chondrite, weighing 127 kilograms (280 lb); it was described as triangular in shape, and it created a 1 m (3.3 ft) deep hole upon impact.

== Contemporary response ==
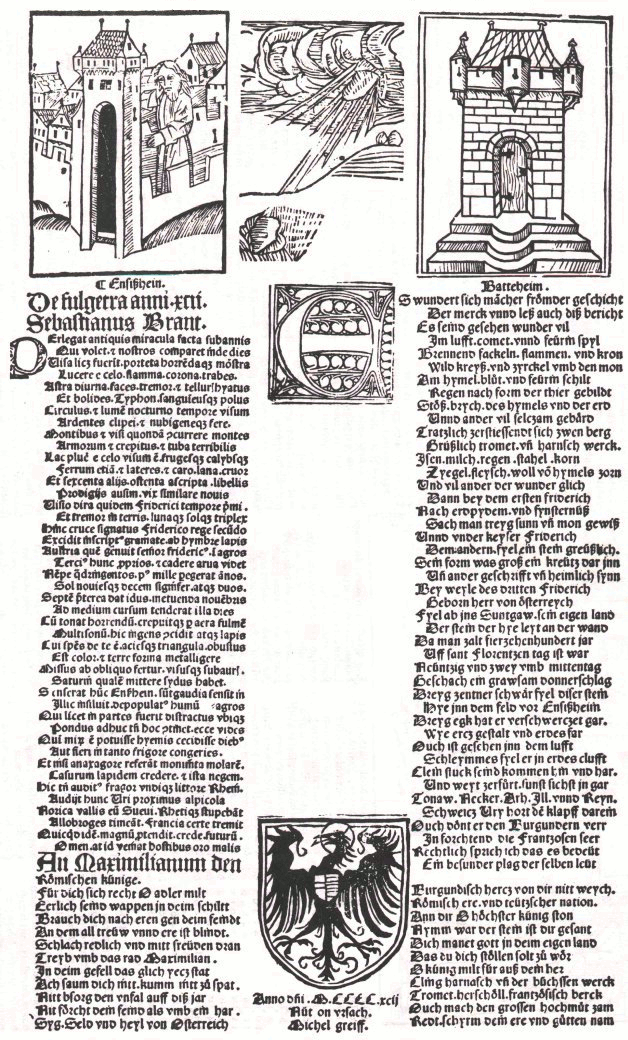
A copy of the original Brant text with a stylised image of the Ensisheim meteorite's fall.

The fall of the meteorite through the Earth's atmosphere was observed as a fireball at a distance of up to 150 kilometres (93 mi) from where it eventually landed. Residents of the walled town and nearby farms and villages gathered at the location to raise the meteorite from its impact hole and began removing pieces of it. A local magistrate interfered with the destruction of the stone, in order to preserve the object for King Maximilian, the son of the reigning Holy Roman Emperor Frederick III. A piece of the meteorite was sent to Cardinal Piccolomini (later Pope Pius III) at the Vatican along with a number of related verses written by Sebastian Brant.

King Maximilian, who was on his way to a campaign against France, ordered for it to be preserved at the local church, "suspended by a chain". He and his advisors decided that the meteorite was a good omen. It was subsequently utilized for propaganda against France. One reason for the quick spreading of the story throughout Europe was the loud volume of the meteorite impact (contemporaries reportedly heard the sound at least 100 miles (160 km) away). Another reason was the use of broadsheets with dramatic pictures under the direction of the poet Sebastian Brandt (1458–1521). Brandt, a satirist and author of Das Narrenschiff described the meteorite and its fall in the poem "Loose Leaves Concerning the Fall of the Meteorite". The fall is also described in Folio 257 of the Nuremberg Chronicle. Brandt created broadsheets in Latin and German with a poem describing it as an omen for the king's success in battles against France.

Two months later, Maximilian defeated a far larger French army than his own at the Battle of Senlis, which prompted Brandt to produce another broadsheet reminding the readers about his prediction. In 1493, he wrote another broadsheet. By this time, the French were no longer a threat (because Maximilian had just signed the Treaty of Senlis with them), so Brandt directed his readers' attention towards the Turks.

The German artist Albrecht Dürer possibly sketched his observation of the meteorite's fall on the reverse of his painting St. Jerome in the Wilderness.

== Fate ==
The meteorite stayed in the Ensisheim church, except during the great French Revolution, when as described by Gustavus Detlef Hinrichs it was "dragged to the Colmar, the capital of the Province, and considerably reduced in weight". On January 23, 1896 it weighed 54.8 kilo or 111 lbs. Nine kilogrammes were sent to Paris, and as of 1905 were in the great Museum of Natural History of the Botanical Garden.

Today the meteorite can still be seen in Ensisheim's museum, the sixteenth-century Musée de la Régence.
