= St. Jerome in the Wilderness (Dürer) =

Painting by Albrecht Dürer, c. 1495–1496

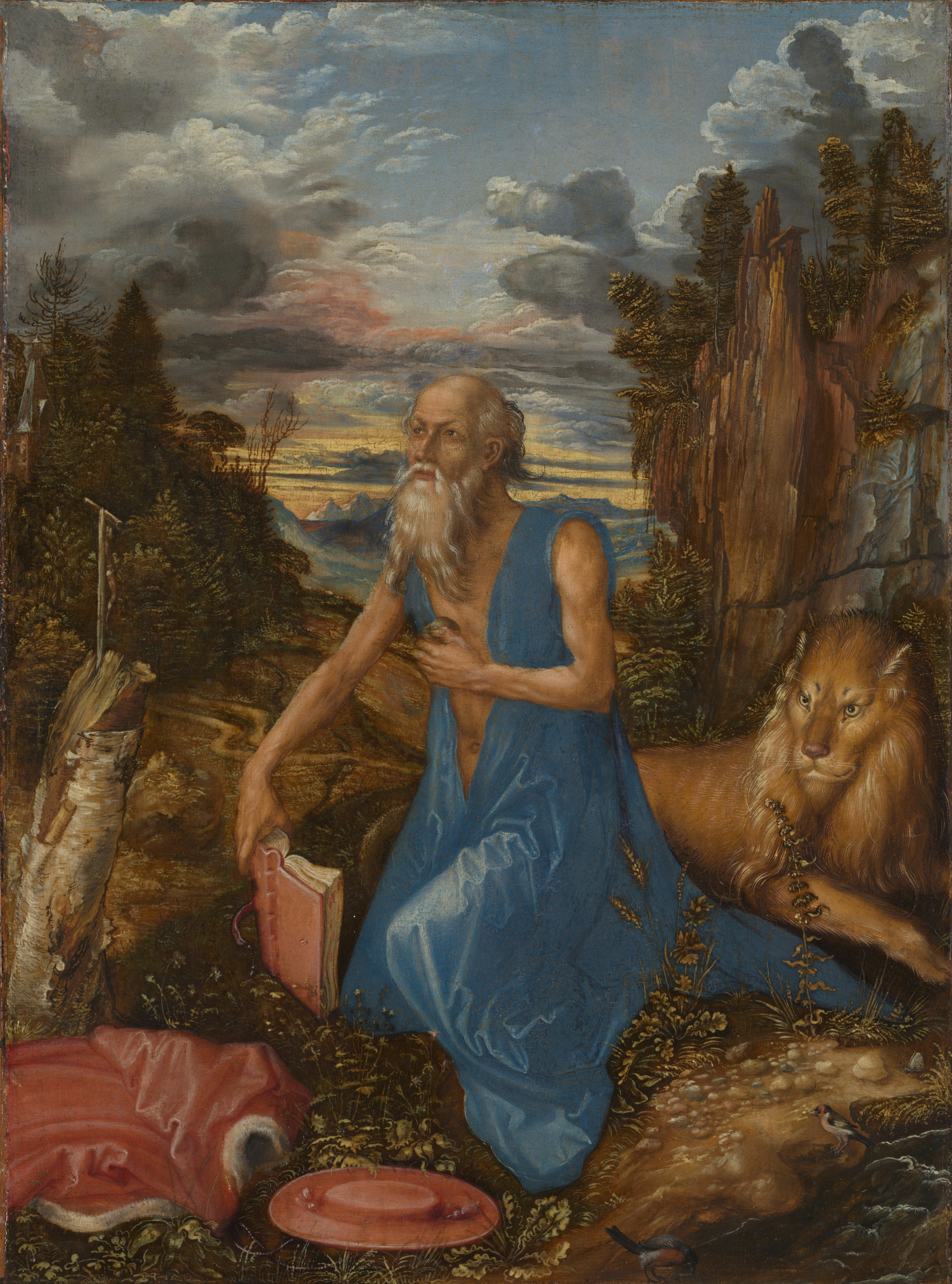
- Artist: Albrecht Dürer
- Year: c. 1495–1496
- Medium: Oil on panel
- Dimensions: 23 cm × 17 cm (9.1 in × 6.7 in)
- Location: National Gallery, London

St. Jerome in the Wilderness is a double-sided oil painting on panel by the German Renaissance artist Albrecht Dürer, executed around 1496, now in the National Gallery in London, where both sides are displayed.

On the reverse of this painting is an image of what appears to be a meteor/meteorite or a comet. Dürer's inspiration may have been the depictions of comets in the Nuremberg Chronicle of 1493. However, those woodcuts are highly stylized, and are not intended to show historical comets, whereas Dürer's image has the feel of an actual observation, as does the blazing star in Dürer's enigmatic engraving Melencolia I, published in 1514. If Dürer's images do represent actual celestial objects, then there are three possible candidates. The first is the Comet of 1491. Dr Sten Odenwald said that it "allegedly came to within 0.0094 AU on 1491 Feb. 20.0 TT, but the orbit of this comet is very uncertain"; The second is the Ensisheim meteorite. This was suggested by Ursula B Marvin ('The meteorite of Ensisheim – 1492 to 1992',(1992)), in relation to Melencolia I. This object fell in Alsace on 7 November 1492. The third is the comet of 1493, mentioned in the chronological section of Sir David Brewster's The Edinburgh Encyclopædia, which said it was: "seen before and after passing its meridian."

== History ==
The work was attributed to Dürer in 1957, based on the resemblance between the lion and a similar animal on a membrane drawing from the artist's second trip to Venice, now at the Hamburger Kunsthalle. The lion was almost surely drawn from St. Mark's Lion depictions in the city.

The painting was previously in the Fitzwilliam Museum of Cambridge, and was later bought by the London museum.

St. Jerome was a common subject of art at the time. Dürer for this work was probably inspired by similar depictions by Giovanni Bellini, or other artists influenced by Andrea Mantegna.

== Description ==
Jerome is portrayed during his hermitage, surrounded by all the symbols traditionally attributed to him: the tamed lion, the hat and the cardinal garments on the ground (a symbol of rejection of earthly honors), the book (Jerome was a translator of the Vulgate), the stone he used to hit himself, and the crucifix for the prayers.

The depiction of nature is typical of Northern European art, with numerous details such as the small birds, the white butterfly in the lower part, as well as the fine rendering of the trunk's bark or the depiction of grass spear by spear. The sky in the background is similar to Dürer's watercolor of the Pool in the Wood, now in the British Museum.

== Back panel of the painting ==
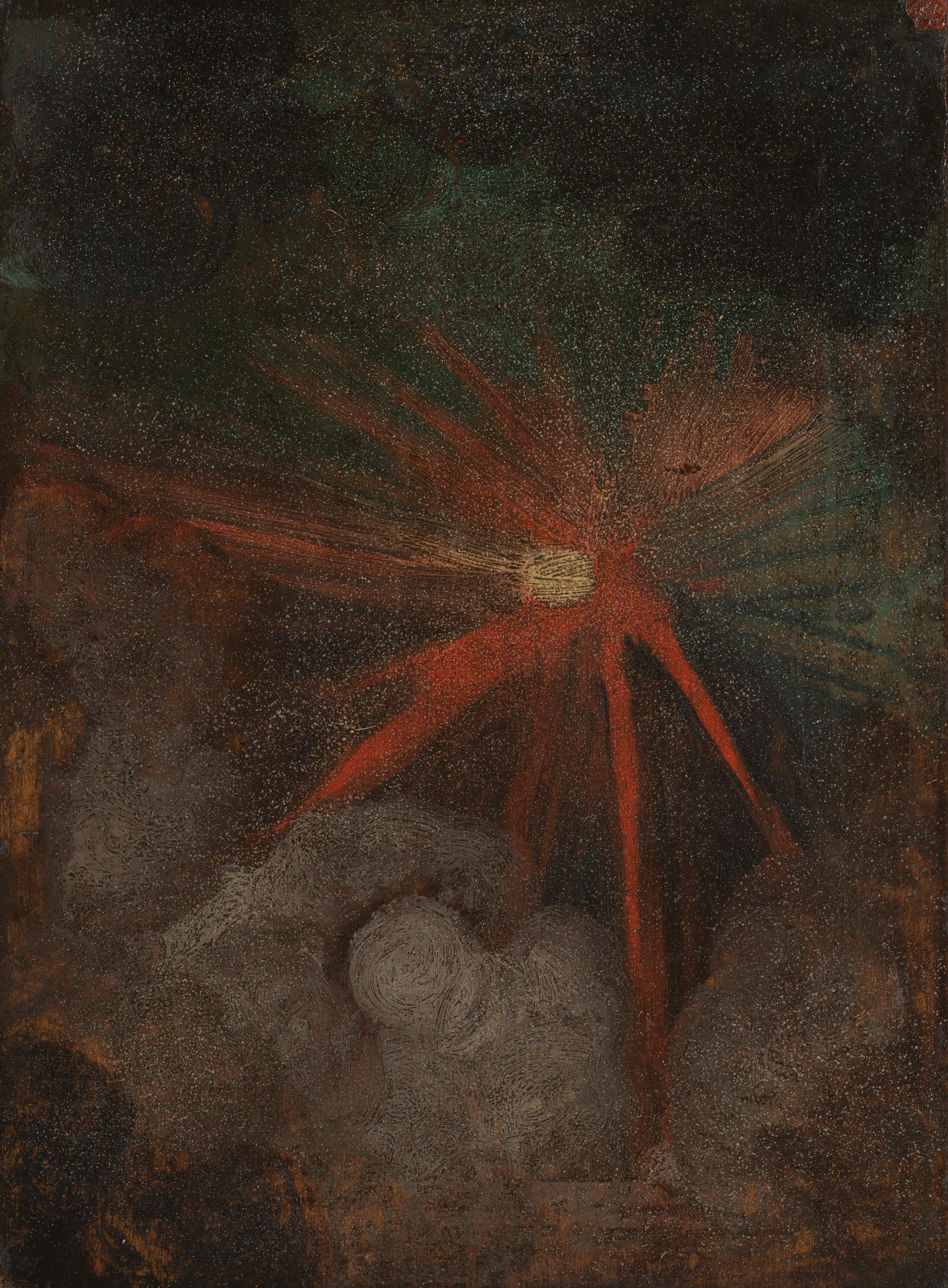
Reverse image

On the reverse of this painting is an image of what appears to be a meteor/meteorite or comet. Dürer's inspiration may have been the depictions of comets in the Nuremberg Chronicle of 1493. However, those woodcuts are highly stylized, and are not intended to show historical comets, whereas Dürer's image has the feel of an actual observation, as does the blazing star in Dürer's enigmatic engraving Melencolia I, published in 1514.

If Dürer's images do represent actual celestial objects, then there are three possible candidates. The first is the Comet of 1491. Dr Sten Odenwald said that it "allegedly came to within 0.0094 AU on 1491 Feb. 20.0 TT, but the orbit of this comet is very uncertain"; NASA's website agrees with Odenwald's comment on the orbit. The second is the Ensisheim meteorite. This was suggested by Ursula B Marvin ('The meteorite of Ensisheim – 1492 to 1992',(1992)), in relation to Melencolia I. This object fell in Alsace on 7 November 1492. The third is the comet of 1493, mentioned in the chronological section of Sir David Brewster's The Edinburgh Encyclopædia, which said it was: "seen before and after passing its meridian."

== See also ==
- List of paintings by Albrecht Dürer
