= Ferdinand Schlöth =

Swiss sculptor

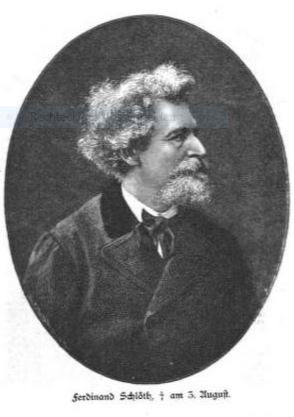
Ferdinand Schlöth; from the Illustrirte Zeitung (1891)

Lukas Ferdinand Schlöth (25 January 1818, Basel - 2 August 1891, Lutzenberg) was a Swiss sculptor in the late Classical style.

== Life and work ==
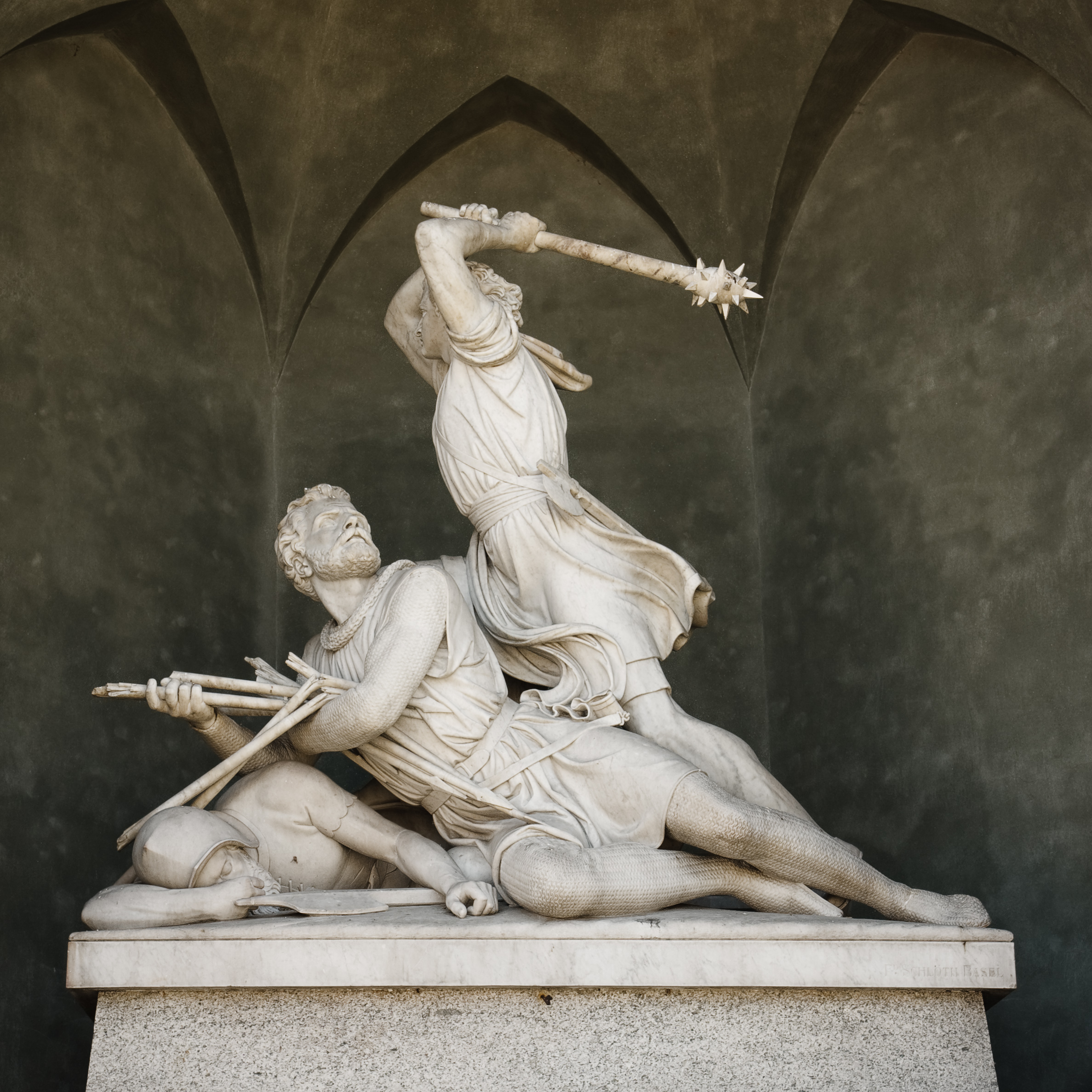
The Winkelried Memorial

He was born in Basel to Heinrich Ludwig Schlöth and Maria Salome Treu as the sixth of ten children. His father was locksmith from Berlin and became a citizen of Binningen in 1809 and of Basel in 1820. In Basel, he established a workshop as a blacksmith beside the Birsig. Following an apprenticeship with his father, Schlöth was employed in his shop for several years. When his father died in 1839, he took over the workshop and operated it together with his older brother, Friedrich Ludwig. During this time, he also took drawing lessons from Hieronymus Hess and studied modeling with the sculptor Johann Heinrich Neustück.

At twenty-five years of age in 1843, Schlöth decided to study sculpture in Rome. By 1847, he had opened his own studio there. One of his teachers was probably his fellow Swiss emigrant, Heinrich Max Imhof, with whom he would later develop a hateful rivalry. In Rome, he became influenced by Bertel Thorvaldsen which was seen in his works on sculptures of the Greek mythological figures. In 1855, he won a competition for a monument honoring the Swiss hero Arnold von Winkelried, to be erected in Stans. It was inaugurated in 1865, and immediately made him one of the most prominent Swiss sculptors. This was followed by a monument commemorating the Battle of St. Jakob an der Birs, which was completed in 1872. In Rome Schlöth experienced financial hardship and often was unable to work due to a lack of Carrara marble. He lived modestly and mainly worked for his clientele from Basel. He remained in Rome until 1874, when he married the wealthy widow, Emma Müller-Gengenbach, and returned to Switzerland. There he divided his time between Basel and Lutzenberg. In Lutzenberg, the family owned an estate, which was brought into the marriage by his wife.

In 1873, he won another competition, for a monument honoring Wilhelm von Tegetthoff in Vienna, but the project never came to fruition. He also created a series of busts for the Kunstmuseum Basel. Most of his works are made of white Carrara marble. About one hundred sculptures by Schlöth are known, of which more than thirty are now known only through historic photographs or literary descriptions.

In addition to his sculpting, Schlöth took on some students, most notably Richard Kissling. In Rome, he influenced the young Reinhold Begas. Among his later pupils was his nephew, Achilles Schlöth. In Ferdinand Schlöths last will, Achilles was mentioned as the sole heir of his sculpture workshop.

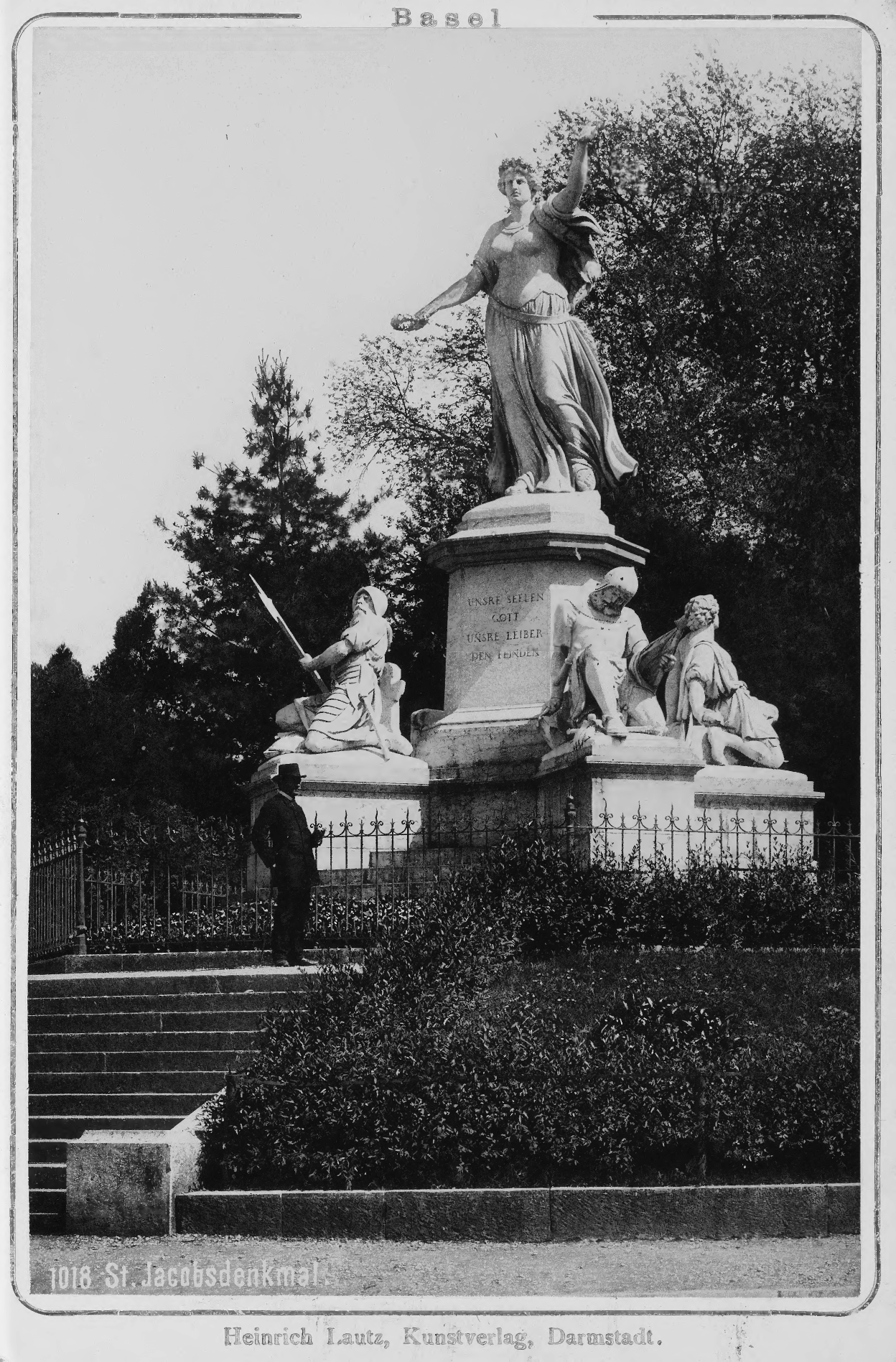
St. Jakob's Memorial
