= Adèle d'Affry =

Swiss artist, sculptor (1836–1879)

Adèle d'Affry Duchess of Castiglione-Altibrandi
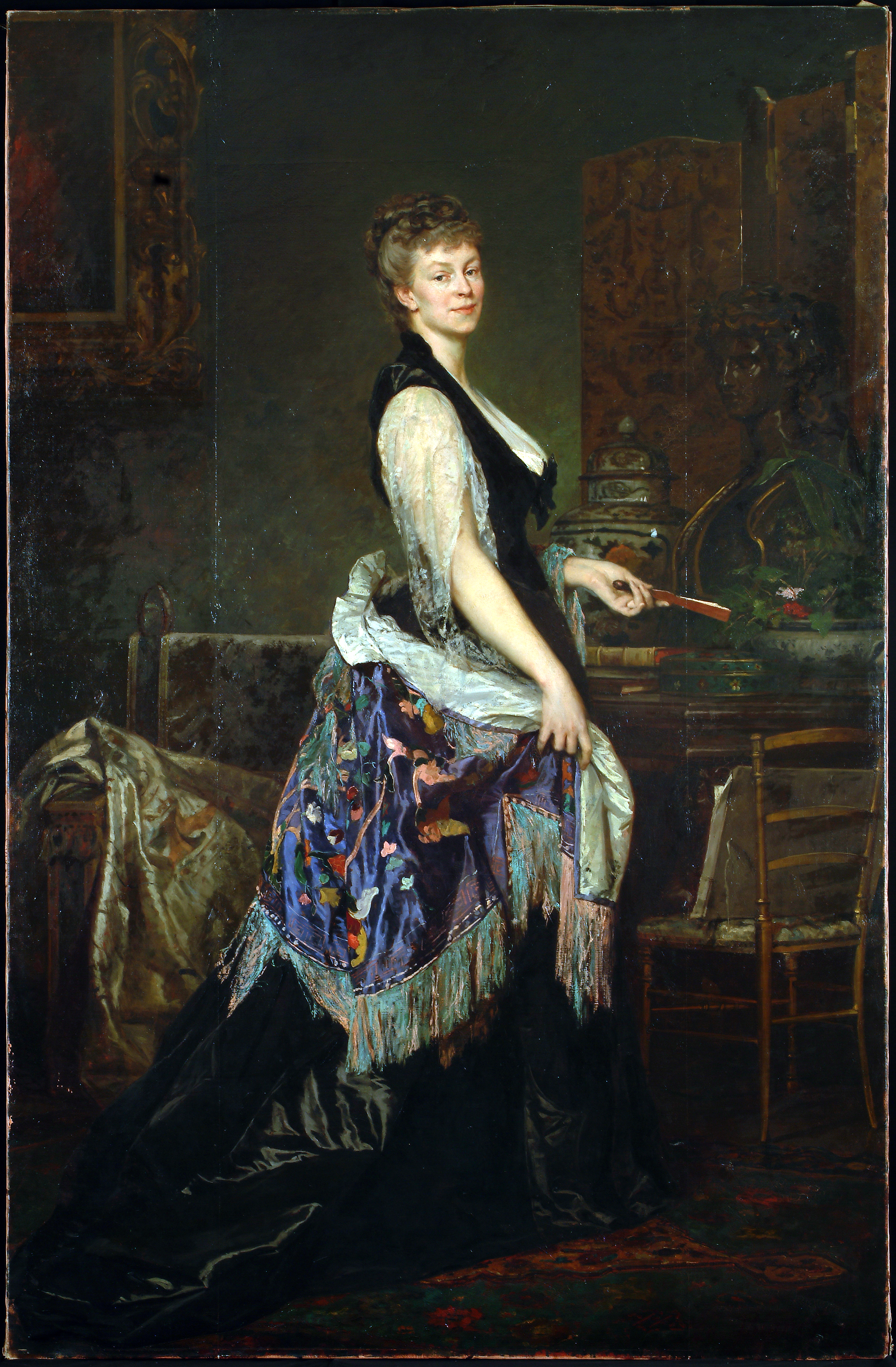
- Edouard-Théophile Blanchard, Portrait de la duchesse Castiglione (1877)
- Born: 6 July 1836; Fribourg
- Died: 16 July 1879 (aged 43); Castellammare di Stabia
- Known for: sculpture, painting
- Spouse(s): Carlo Colonna, Duke of Castiglione-Altibrandi

Adelaide Nathalie Marie Hedwig Philippine d'Affry, Duchess of Castiglione Colonna, also went under the pseudonym Marcello, (6 July 1836 – 14 July 1879). She was a painter and sculptor, particularly known for her busts, which she exhibited at the Paris Salon.

== Early life ==
D'Affry was born in Fribourg and was the eldest daughter of Count Louis d'Affry (1810-1841) and Lucie de Maillardoz (1816-1897), the daughter of Philippe de Maillardoz, Marquis de Maillardoz. The d'Affry's were a military family: Louis d'Affry (1743–1810), her great-grandfather, was the first Landammann of Switzerland. Count Louis-Auguste-Augustin d'Affry, her great-grandfather, devoted himself to engraving and documenting scenes from military life. His son, Charles, served under Bonaparte.

Adèle d'Affry had a younger sister, Cécile Marie Philippine Carolina (1839–1911). After their father died on June 26, 1841, Adele and Cécile were raised by their mother. She grew up between Freiburg and Givisiez during the summer months, and Nice or Italy during the winter. Between 1853 and 1854, d'Affry received a classical education, including drawing lessons from Auguste Joseph Dietrich. It was during these years that she took modelling classes in the studio of the Swiss sculptor Heinrich Max Imhof in Rome. d'Affry studied subjects such as art, Latin, philosophy, and theology. She also had an immense love for music, which influenced her choice her pseudonym, which she chose based on her love for the eighteenth-century Venetian composer Benedetto Marcello.

On 5 April 1856, Adèle d'Affry married Carlo Colonna (1825–1856) in Rome. A month later, he was knighted and received the title of Duke of Castiglione-Altibrandi, converted into Castiglione-Colonna. The marriage was very short as Carlo Colonna died suddenly of typhoid fever in Paris on 18 December 1856. d'Affry was obliged to return to Rome in 1857 to settle a dispute with the Colonna family over her husband's estate. d'Affry took refuge in the convent of the Ladies of the Sacred Heart, Trinidad des-Monts. Her artistic vocation gradually awakened at that time. She took lessons in Imhof's studio, visited many churches and admired the works of antiquity and Michelangelo. In the fall of 1857, she modelled the bust of her late husband. This first sculpture was quickly followed by a self-portrait.

In 1859, d'Affry moved to Paris and rented an apartment from Léon Riesener (1808–1878), a cousin of Eugėne Delacroix, at No. 1 rue Bayard. Pierre Andrieu (1821–1892), an assistant to Riesener and Delacroix, helped to decorate the dining room and workshop in fresco.

D'Affry began to frequent the brilliant society of the Second Empire. She chaperoned her sister Cécile until her marriage, on 29 October, to Baron Moritz von Ottenfels-Gschwind (1820–1907), an Austrian diplomat. Her rank in society led d'Affry to frequent the salons of the Faubourg Saint-Germain, and the shows held by the Comtesse de Circourt. D'Affry built lasting friendships, including with Adolphe Thiers and Auguste Joseph Alphonse Gratry.

== Early career ==
D'Affry, inspired by Louis I of Bavaria’s collection of statues, once wrote, “For me [art] will be a profession.” Her artistic journey began in France, where she learned the basics of drawing and painting with the help of portraitist Joseph Auguste Dietrich and painter Joseph Fricero. Later, she moved to Rome, where she studied sculpture under Heinrich Maximilian Imhof. In 1857, she sculpted two important works, a self-portrait bust and a bust of her recently deceased husband, Carlo Colonna, Duke of Castiglione-Aldrovandi, both of which played a significant role in launching her artistic career.

After relocating to Paris in 1859, Marcello continued to refine her skills by copying existing artworks at the Louvre. Although female artists were often discouraged and faced numerous barriers in exhibiting at the Salon, Marcello was a notable exception. She had already established herself as a sculptor and built influential connections within the art world and Second Empire Paris.

Despite being rejected from the École nationale supérieure des Beaux-Arts due to her gender, Marcello remained determined to pursue her artistic education independently. She studied animal drawing at the Natural History Museum under the direction of sculptor Antoine-Louis Barye and modeled from nature, with Auguste Clésinger monitoring her progress. In December, she began anatomy classes in the basement of the School of Medicine under Professor Sappey. During this formative period, she also worked on her first successful composition, La Belle Hélène (1860). On September 6, 1860, during a dinner at the Barbier, Adele met Delacroix. Although her application to the École nationale supérieure des Beaux-Arts was officially rejected in 1861, she continued her development back in Rome, where she admired Jean-Baptiste Carpeaux's Ugolino and his children at the Villa Medici. The two artists formed a lasting friendship that endured until Carpeaux's death. In February 1864, d'Affry received Carpeaux in Givisiez, and rejected the marriage proposal he presented on behalf of his son.

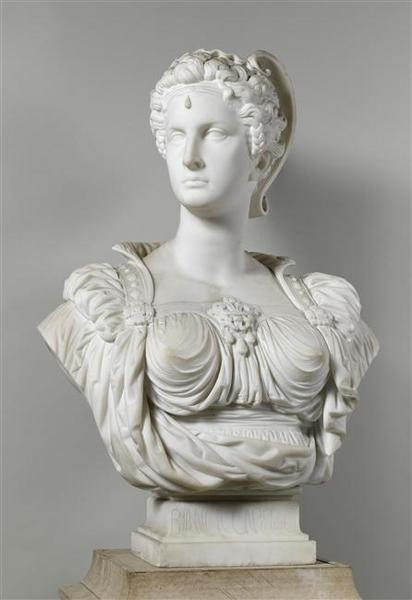
d'Affry's bust of Bianca Capello (1874)

== Peak career ==
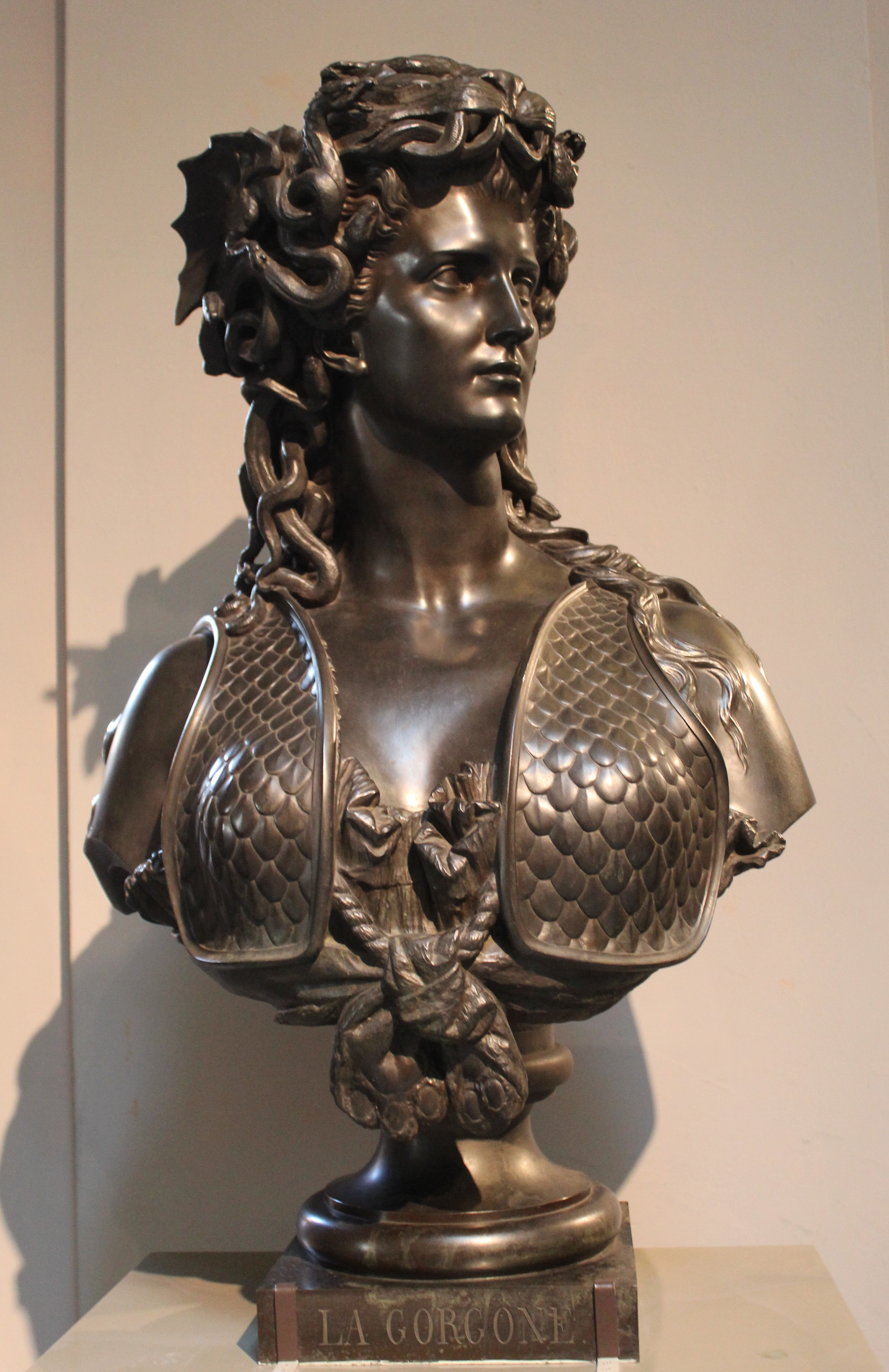
La Gorgone (1865)

In 1863, d'Affry exhibited three busts at the Paris Salon, marking a significant moment in her artistic career. After much hesitation, she chose to exhibit under the pseudonym "Marcello". Her works included Bianca Cappello, the Portrait of Count G. N ... [icolaÿ], and the portrait of the Duchess of San C ... [Esario], a work in wax. Her work captured the attention of many, including Empress Eugénie. The success met by her Bianca gained the attention of the Empress, who invited her to participate in one of the famous Tuileries Mondays. d'Affry was then invited to the court and was able to meet Napoleon III, whom she greatly admired. Impressed by one of her pieces displayed at the Salon, Empress Eugénie commissioned her to make a portrait, further solidifying her reputation among elite circles. She gave marble a sense of life, imbuing her sculptures with vitality and emotion. This was evident in her bust of General Milans del Bosch, which showcases her skill in capturing both presence and personality in her work. Marcello exhibited The Gorgon, a marble bust, in the 1865 Salon and she received the official order of a portrait of the Empress Eugénie, which was intended to decorate the throne room of the city hall of Paris. d'Affry produced four different versions of this bust.The bust of Empress Eugénie was a strong example of Marcello's ability to portray power in a human and accessible fashion.

Charles Frederick Worth, a prominent fashion designer of the time, owned three of her sculptures. Additionally, her work was recognized by architect Charles Garnier, who chose to display her sculpture "Pythia" in the basin of the grand staircase of the Opera Garnier, a testament to her acclaim and artistic influence.

During the months of June and July 1866, d'Affry left for London and monitored the reception of her bronze bust of The Gorgon, which was exhibited at the Royal Academy. Her admiration for Queen Marie Antoinette, which she shared with Empress Eugénie, led her to complete the busts of Marie Antoinette at Versailles and Marie Antoinette at the Temple. She exhibited a bust of Empress Eugénie at the 1866 Paris Salon, where it was harshly criticized and rejected by the Commission of fine arts of the city of Paris. She feared having fallen out of favour with Eugenie. Eventually, the prefect Haussmann made the decision to accept the bust.

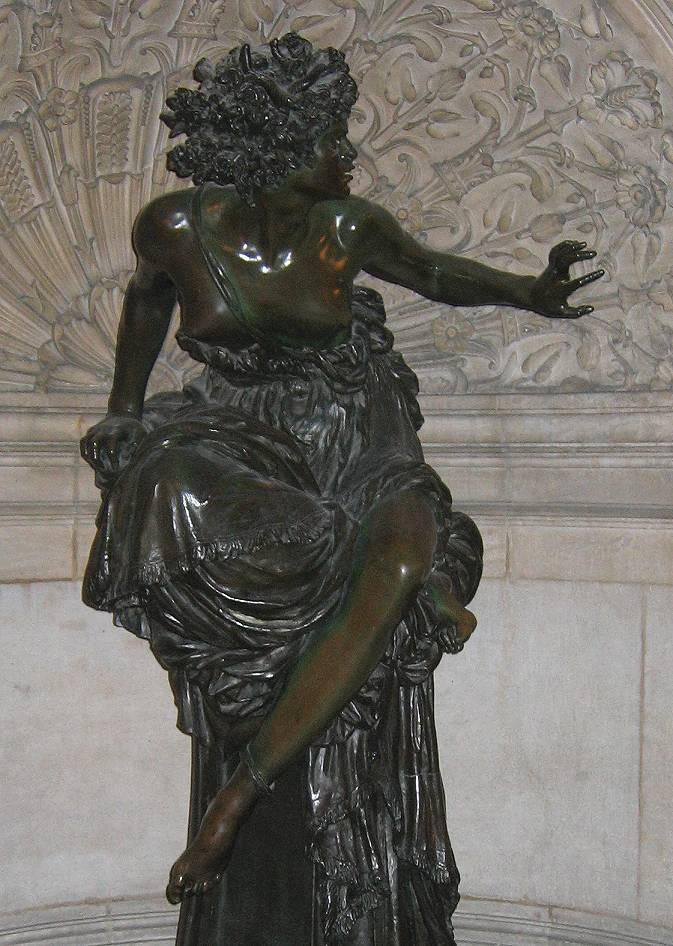
d'Affry's Pythia (1870) at the Paris Opera

d'Affry presented eight of her works, including Hecate, which Napoleon III had commissioned for the gardens of Compiègne, at the 1867 World's Fair in the section of the Papal States. Then, accompanied by her mother, she travelled during May and June 1867 across Austria, Germany and Hungary. In Budapest, the two women attended the coronation of Empress Elisabeth. On her return to Paris, d'Affry made a small marble bust of Elisabeth.

Between March and August 1868, d'Affry travelled in the north of Italy and stopped in Rome. At Cauterets, in the Pyrenees, she crossed the border and travelled to Spain, where she was caught in an insurrection. Despite the dangers of this situation, she remained in Madrid where she worked with her friends, the painters Henri Regnault and Georges Clairin. She met the revolutionary General Milans del Bosch, and she modelled his bust. Letters of recommendation from Prosper Mérimée opened the doors for her of the Prado Museum. She admired, among others, the works of Diego Velázquez.

From Fribourg, where she lived since January 1876, d'Affry returned to Italy, visiting Florence, Orvieto, Rome, Bologna, Ferrara, Ravenna, Padua, Venice, Verona and Milan. The director of the Uffizi Gallery commissioned a portrait. Her bust of Baroness of Keffenbrinck, presented at the Salon of that year earned her an honourable mention.

== Social life ==
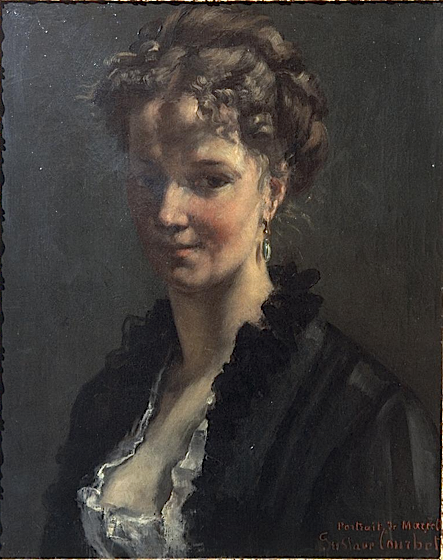
Courbet's Portrait of Marcello (1870)

d'Affry had established herself well in Parisian society, often interacting with other artists. She attended sessions at Édouard Manet’s studio, but when Manet asked if she would model for him, she refused, though she did sit for a portrait by Gustave Courbet. d'Affry and the Empress Eugénie became quite close, as a surviving telegram and d'Affry's journal entries attest. She also maintained a friendship with Adolphe Thiers, the president of France who succeeded the imperial couple. Despite her social and artistic success, she faced political criticism for being close to the French imperial family.

Carpeaux called her a prodigy. In the final years of Carpeaux's life, she regularly visited him, maintaining their connection until his death in 1875.

== Illness and death ==
In 1877, exhausted by her cough and joint pain, d'Affry spent December in Italy on the advice of her doctors. In 1878, d'Affry moved constantly between Naples, Switzerland and Paris, in search of a climate that would calm her hemoptysis.

Tuberculosis pushed her more towards painting because it was less straining. Based in Castellammare di Stabia in 1879, d'Affry put her papers in order, working on writing her memoirs which were left unfinished. On January 2, a second version of her will listed the sculptures she bequeathed to the State of Fribourg, provided that a museum be dedicated to her work. She died of tuberculosis on 16 July 1879.

== Selected works ==
- Gorgone, 1865, Fribourg, musée d'art et d'histoire
- Pythia, 1870, Paris, Paris Opera. This work serves as the inspiration for a key feature in Fantastic Beasts: The Crimes of Grindelwald.
- Femme transtévérine, 1874, musée d'Orsay
- La Marquise de Talenay, 1875, musée d'Orsay

== Sources ==
- d'Alcantara, Odette (1961). Marcello : Adèle d'Affry, duchesse Castiglione-Colonna, 1836–1879, sa vie, son œuvre, sa pensée et ses amis. Genève: Éditions générales.
- Bessis, Henriette (1980). Marcello sculpteur. Fribourg: Musée d'art et d'histoire de Fribourg.
- Ghislain de Diesbach: La double vie de la duchesse Colonna, Paris: Librairie académique Perrin, 1988 ; réedition Genève : Editions de Penthes, coll. « Suisses dans le monde », 2015
- Pierre, Caterina Y. Genius has no sex: The sculpture of Marcello (1836-1879). Pregny-Genève et Gollion: Penthes et Infolio.https://archive.org/details/pierregenius2010/page/n3/mode/2up
- Pierre, Caterina Y. "A New Formula for High Art: The Genesis and Reception of Marcello's Pythia." In Nineteenth-Century Art Worldwide 2:2 (Autumn 2003), https://www.19thc-artworldwide.org/autumn03/qa-new-formula-for-high-artq-the-genesis-and-reception-of-marcellos-pythia
- Gianna A. Mina (dir.), Marcello, Adèle d'Affry (1836-1879), duchesse de Castiglione Colonna (catalogue d'exposition (Fribourg, MAHF, 7 novembre 2014 – 22 février 2015; Ligornetto, Museo Vela, 26 avril – 30 août 2015; Musées nationaux du Palais de Compiègne, 16 octobre 2015 – 1er février 2016; Pregny-Genève, Musée des Suisses dans le monde, février – juin 2016)), Milan, édition 5 Continents, 2014.
- Mélanie Kaeser et Michel Viegnes (éd), Adèle d'Affry "Marcello" Écrits de fiction: nouvelles, théâtre, récits, Fribourg, Presses Littéraires de Fribourg, 2014.
- Simone de Reyff (dir.) et Fabien Python (dir.), Les Cahiers d'Adèle, Société d'histoire du canton de Fribourg, coll. «Archives de la Société d'histoire du canton de Fribourg / nouvelle série» (no 17), 2014
- Leïchlé, Mathilde (2021). Marcello (Adèle d’Affry, duchesse de Castiglione Colonna, dite). Musée d'Orsay. Archives of Women Artists, Research and Exhibitions, 2021.
- Higonnet, Anne (1995). Berthe Morisot. University of California Press.
- Smee, Sebastian (2024). Paris in Ruins. W.W. Norton.
- Simone de Reyff (ed.), D'Adèle à Marcello. Fragments autobiographiques (1876-1879), Fribourg, Archives de l'Etat de Fribourg, 2024 (coll. Bibliotheca Otolandana, 3).
