= Heinrich Max Imhof =

19th Century Swiss Classical Sculptor

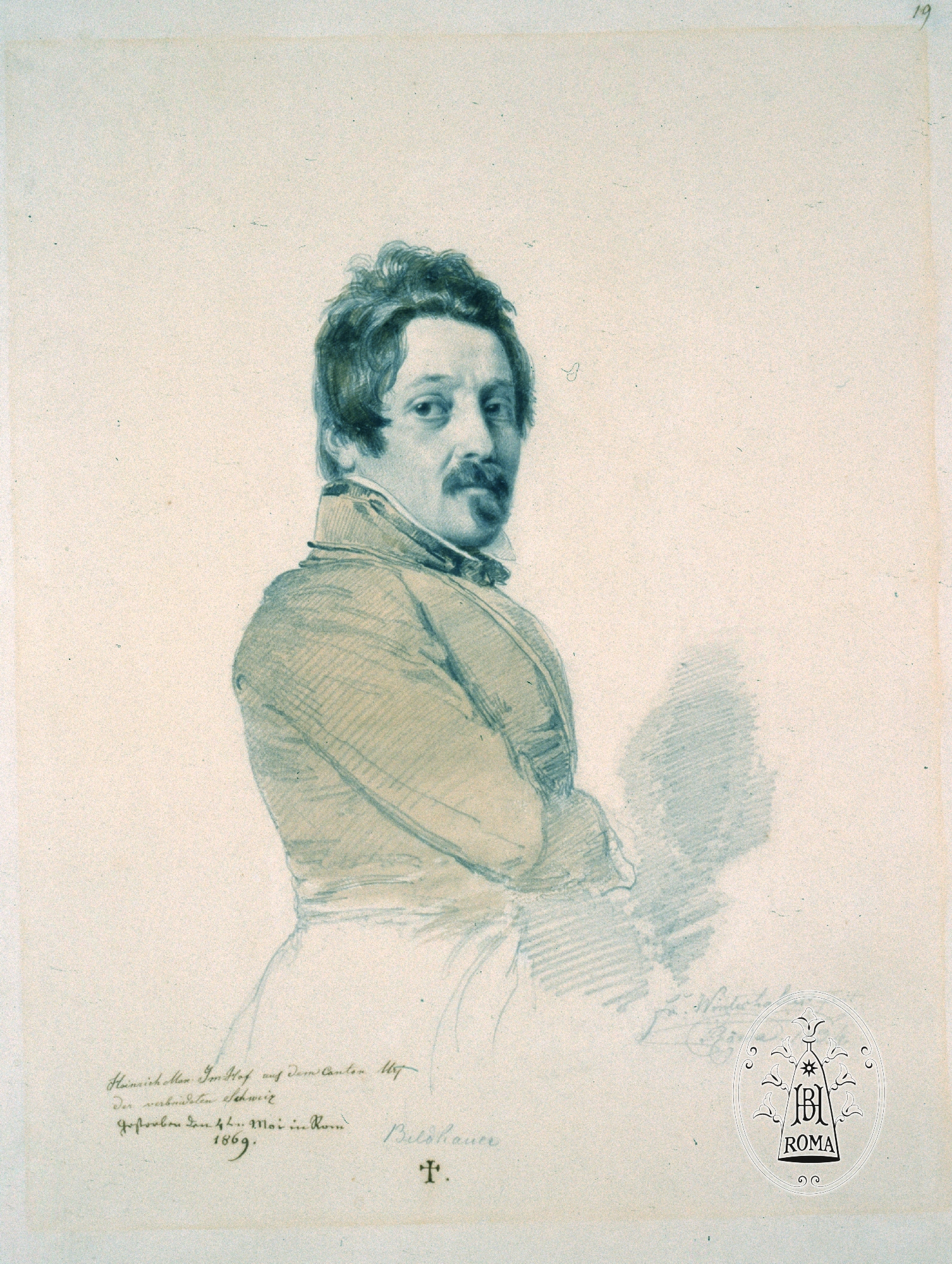
Heinrich Max Imhof (1834); portrait by Franz Xaver Winterhalter

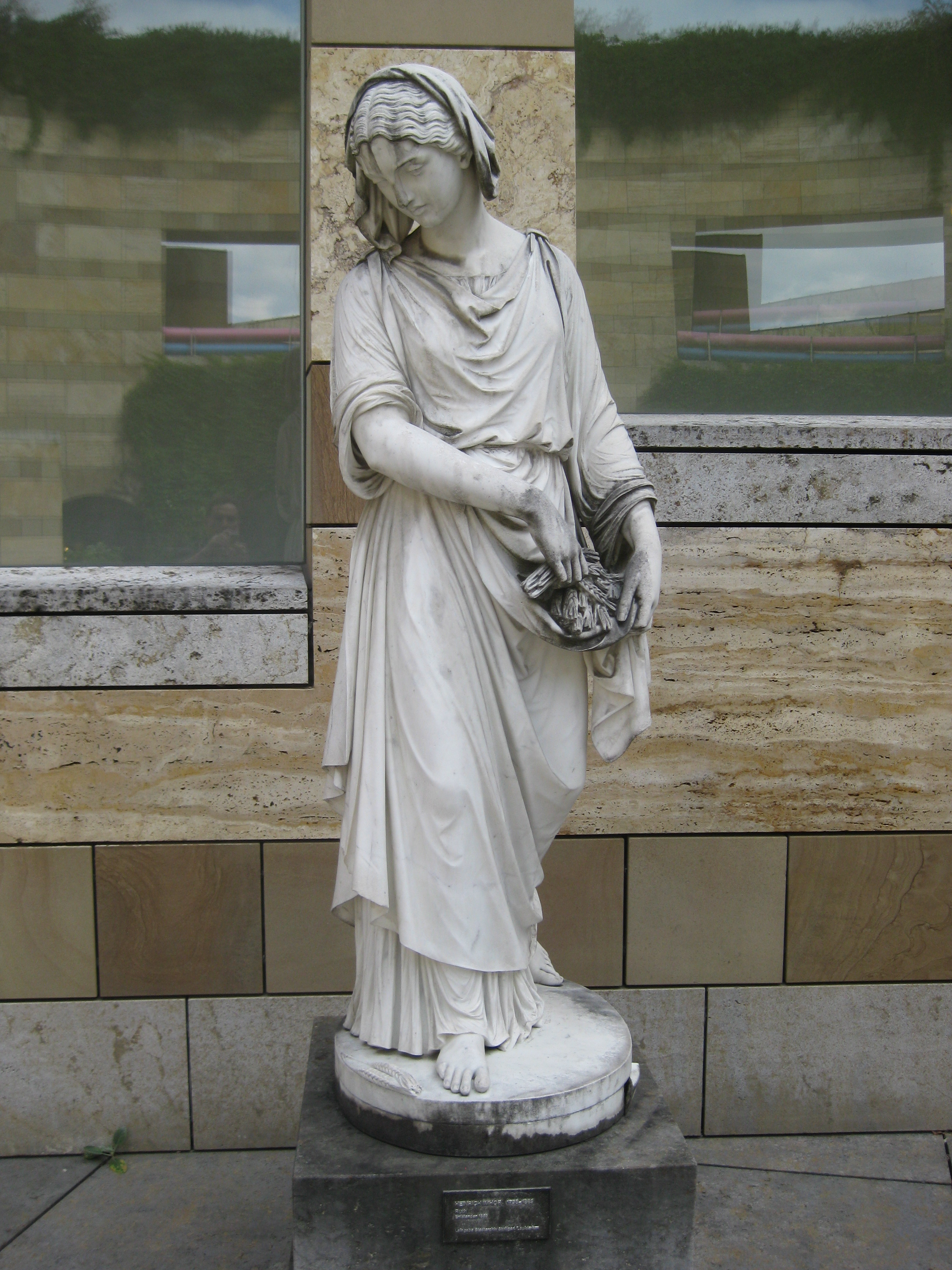
Ruth

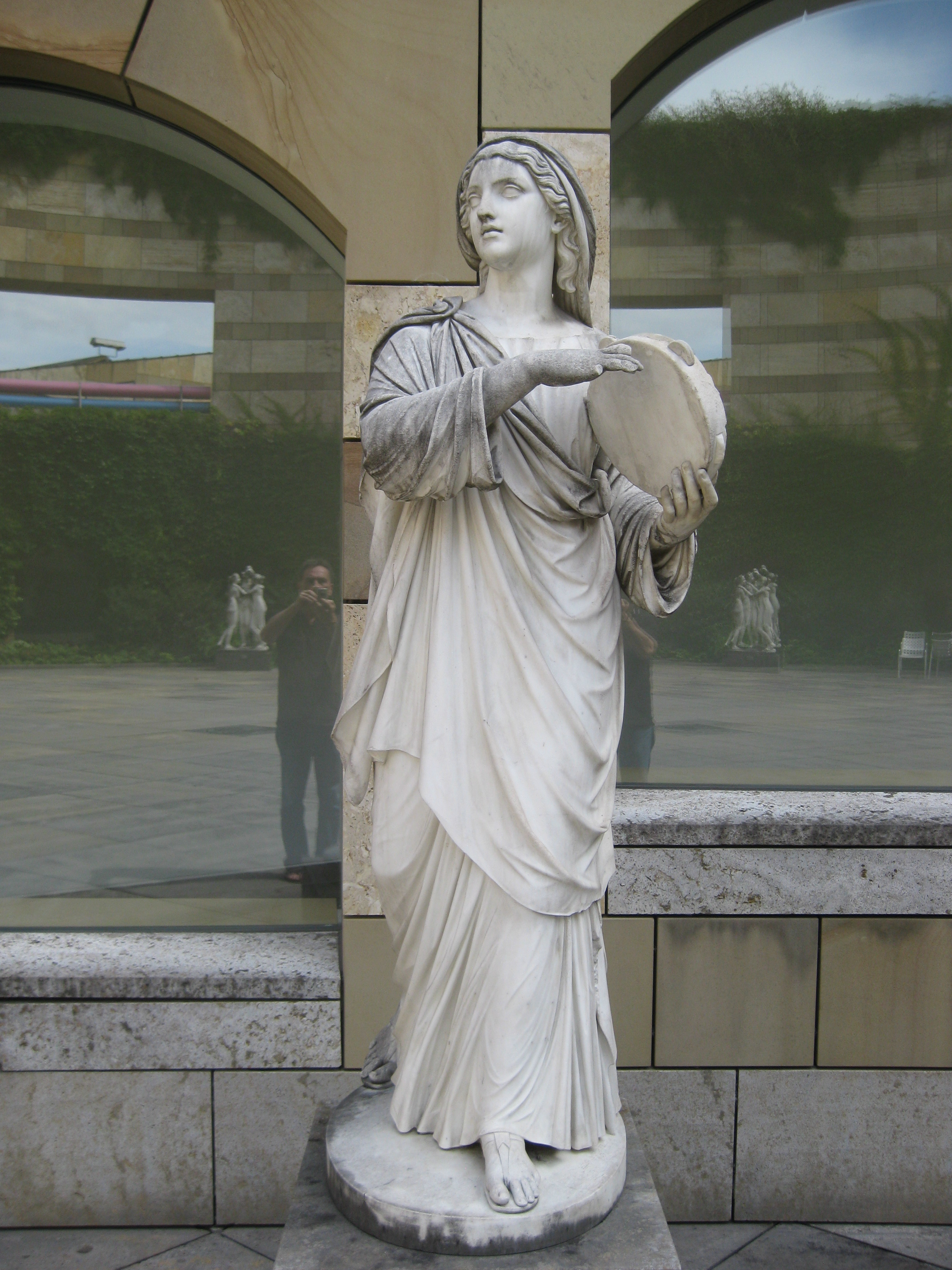
Miriam

Heinrich Max Imhof (14 May 1795 or 1798, Bürglen - 4 May 1869, Rome) was a Swiss sculptor, in the Classical style. Max may be short for either "Maximilian" or "Maximus".

== Biography ==
He was born to a family of tenant farmers and grew up in simple circumstances, but displayed an early talent for drawing. In 1811, he convinced his parents to let him serve an apprenticeship with the wood sculptor, Franz Abart, in Kerns. He made his first professional wood carvings at the parish church there, in 1814. Four years later the travel writer, Johann Gottfried Ebel, became aware of his carvings and brought him to Zürich, where he worked as a freelance sculptor, making portrait reliefs. His clients included the Prussian Crown Prince, Friedrich Wilhelm.

In 1820 Ebel provided the means for him to continue his studies in Stuttgart with Johann Heinrich von Dannecker, then financed his first study trip to Rome. There, he familiarized himself with Classical styles, in the workshops of the Danish sculptor, Bertel Thorvaldsen. Not long after returning, he began making a model of "David with the Head of Goliath"; commissioned by his old client, Friedrich Wilhelm, for Charlottenhof Palace. He also received orders for several royal busts, as well as one of the Renaissance scholar, Johann Reuchlin, for display in the Walhalla Memorial. In 1836, king Otto of Greece appointed him a Professor at the newly established National Technical University of Athens.

Poor health and a decrease in the number of commissions led him to return to Rome in 1838. He would live there for the rest of his life. Within a short time, he acquired clients from not only the German-speaking nobility, but the English and Russian as well. His financial situation remained secure until the outbreak of the Revolutions of 1848, which disrupted the international art market. In 1849, possibly in an effort to improve his situation, he married Henriette Ott (1825-1892), from Zürich. They had five daughters and two sons. He also took some students, including Adèle d'Affry (known as "Marcello"), and Ferdinand Schlöth, who later became his hated rival. During his last years, he suffered from rheumatism, which affected the quality of his work.

== Sources ==
- "Obituary – Heinrich Max Imhof", In: Kunstchronik. Beiblatt zur Zeitschrift für bildende Kunst, #20, 6 August 1869, pg.189 (Online).
- Conrad Escher: "Heinrich Max Imhof",' In: Schweizer Illustrierte, Vol.9, 1905, pp.57–62 (Online).
- Hans A. Lüthy (1974). "Imhof (Im Hof), Heinrich Max". Neue Deutsche Biographie (in German). Vol. 10. Berlin: Duncker & Humblot. pp. 151–152. (full text online).
- Karl Iten: Heinrich Max Imhof, 1795–1869. Ein Urner Bildhauer in Rom. Herausgegeben vom Historischen Verein Uri, Verlag Gisler, Altdorf 1995, ISBN 3-9520570-5-3
- Harald Tesan, Thorvaldsen und seine Bildhauerschule in Rom, Böhlau, 1998 ISBN 3-412-14197-6
- Imhof, Heinrich Max in German, French and Italian in the online Historical Dictionary of Switzerland.
- Helmi Gasser: "Der Maler Albert Anker sucht in Altdorf Heinrich Max Imhof auf", In: Historisches Neujahrsblatt / Historischer Verein Uri. Vol.105, 2014, pp.121–130 (Online).
