= Pierre Andrieu (artist) =

French painter

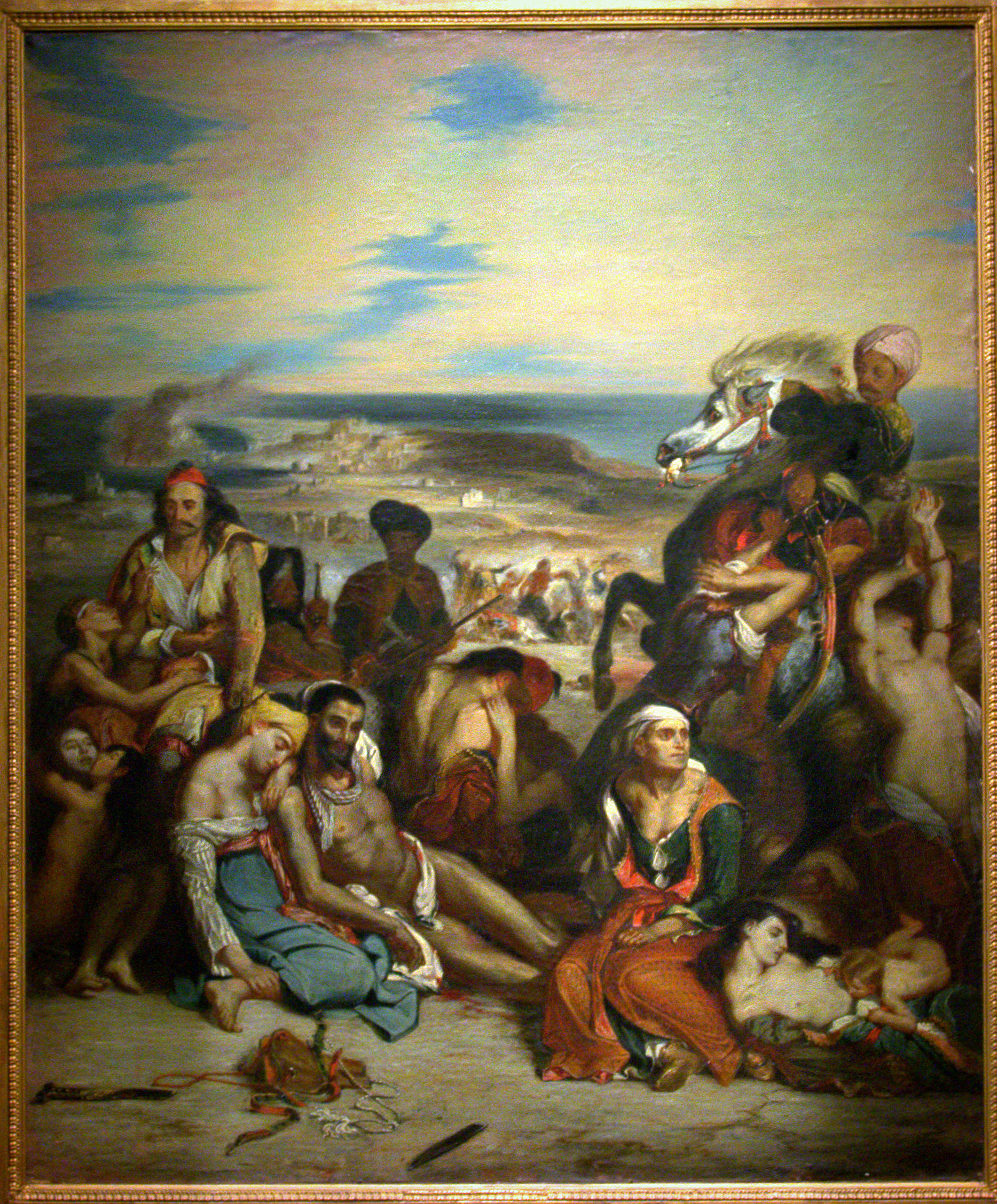
The Massacre of Chios (copy of work by Delacroix)

Pierre Andrieu (1821 – 1892), was a 19th-century French painter.

== Biography ==
He was born in Fenouillet, Haute-Garonne but was trained in Paris, where he joined Eugène Delacroix's studio in 1843. He became Delacroix's most trusted and reliable assistant, and worked on murals at the Church of St. Sulpice and decorations at the Paris City Hall. He restored decorations at the Gallery of Apollo and at the Palais Bourbon library. When a massive canvas dome painting by Delacroix at the Luxembourg Palace library came unglued and crashed to the ground in 1868, Andrieu undertook extensive renovations.

After Delacroix's death in 1863, Andrieu opened his own studio. A flood later ruined his home, causing financial difficulties. This may have led to the allegation that he passed off some of his own paintings as being created by Delacroix.

He is known for his copies of works by Delacroix, but also has work of his own invention, including a still life attributed to him in the National Gallery London, among others. He died in Paris.
