= Battle of St. Jakob an der Birs =

1444 battle of the Old Zürich War

Coordinates: 47.542°N 7.618°E

- Part of the Old Zürich War
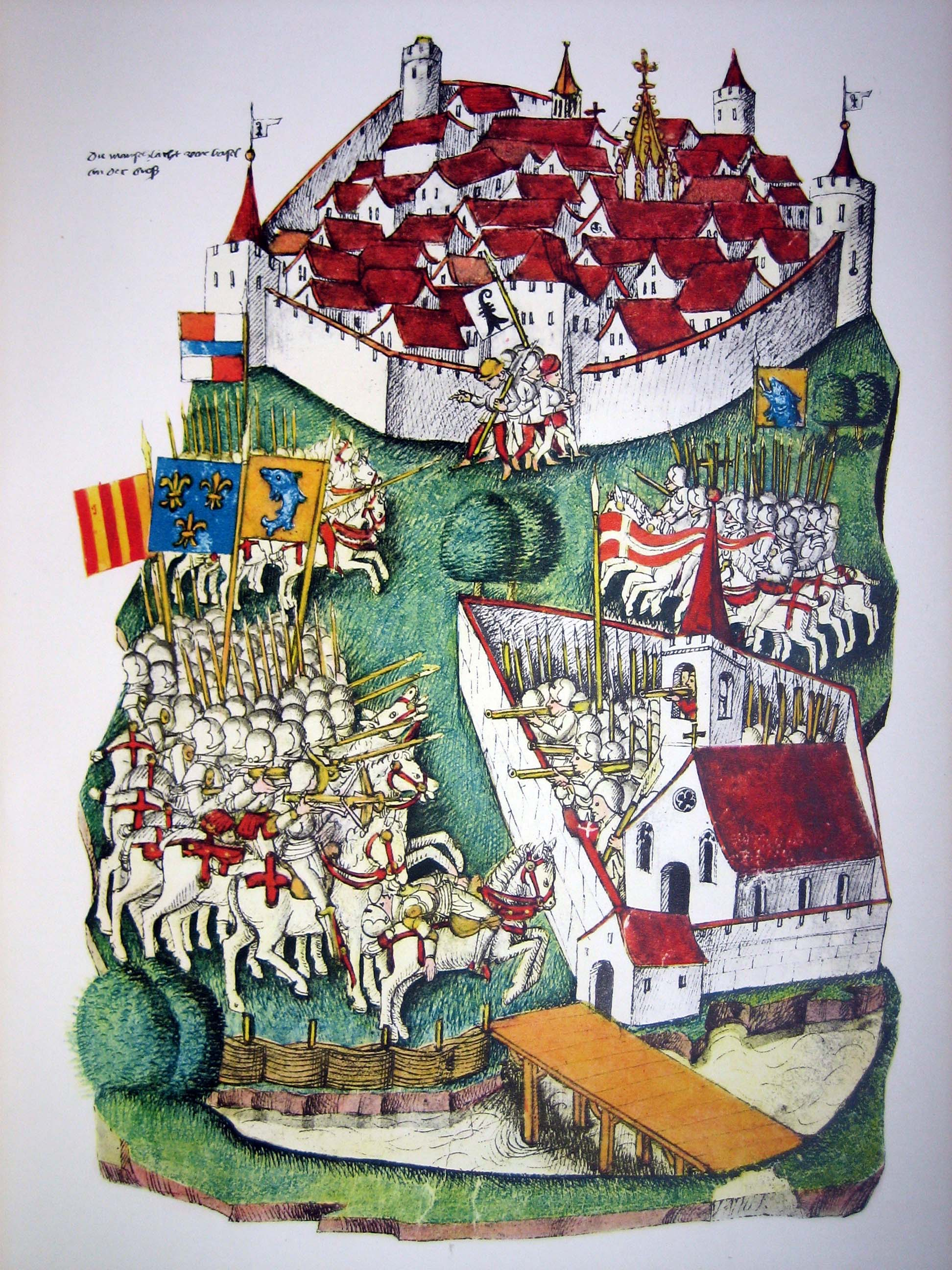
- Illustration of the battle in the Tschachtlanchronik of 1470
Date	26 August 1444
Location	Basel, Switzerland
Result	French victory

Belligerents
France	(Old Swiss Confederacy) Seven Cantons; Basel

Commanders and leaders
Louis, Dauphin of France; Antoine de Chabannes	(Old Swiss Confederacy) Unknown; Henman Sevogel

Strength
30,000–40,000(certainly exaggerated)	c. 1,500: c. 1,300 Confederates; 200–300 Basel troops

Casualties and losses
2,000	1,200–1,500

The Battle of St. Jakob an der Birs was fought between the Old Swiss Confederacy and French (mostly Armagnac) mercenaries, on the banks of the river Birs. The battle took place on 26 August 1444 and was part of the Old Zürich War. The site of the battle was near Münchenstein, Switzerland, just over 1 km outside the city walls of Basel, today within Basel's St-Alban district.

== Background ==
In 1443, the seven cantons of the Old Swiss Confederacy invaded the canton of Zürich and besieged the city. Zürich had allied with Holy Roman Emperor Frederick III, who now appealed to King Charles VII of France to send an army to relieve the siege.

Charles, seeking to send away the "écorcheurs", troublesome troops made idle by the truce with King Henry VI of England in the Hundred Years' War, sent his son the Dauphin (later King Louis XI) with an army of about 30,000 of these écorcheurs into Switzerland, most of them Armagnacs, to relieve Zürich. As the French forces entered Swiss territory at Basel, the Swiss commanders stationed at Farnsburg decided to send an advance troop of 1,300, primarily young pikemen. These moved to Liestal on the night of 25 August, where they were joined by a local force of 200.

== Battle ==
In the early morning, they managed to surprise and rout French vanguard troops at Pratteln and Muttenz. Enthused by this success, and despite strict orders to the contrary, the Swiss troops crossed the Birs to meet the bulk of the French army of some 30,000 men, which was ready for battle. Immediately, the Swiss forces formed three pike squares of five hundred men each, and they fought well when Armagnac cavalry charged again and again and were repulsed.

Aeneas Silvius Piccolomini (1405–1464, later Pope Pius II, until 1439 participant in the Council of Florence), described the battle in vivid detail, telling how the Swiss ripped bloody crossbow bolts from their bodies and charged the enemy even after they had been pierced by pikes or had lost their hands, charging the Armagnacs to avenge their own deaths.

The fighting lasted for several hours and was of an intensity evoking awed commentary from witnesses. Eventually, the Swiss pike squares weakened, so the commander ordered his men to retreat into a small hospital of St. Jakob. A small reinforcement from Basel was repulsed, and its leader, Henman Sevogel, was killed.

The Armagnac troops set their artillery to bombard the hospital, inflicting heavy casualties on the Swiss. Nevertheless, as the offensive party, the Swiss categorically refused to surrender. As the Armagnacs moved into the hospital, the remaining Swiss were pressed into the hospital's garden and killed to the last man within half an hour.

== Aftermath ==
Even though the battle itself was a devastating defeat for the Swiss, and a significant blow to Bern, the canton which contributed the force, it was nevertheless a Swiss success in strategic terms. Because of the heavy casualties on the French side, the original plan of moving towards Zürich, where a Swiss force of 30,000 was ready, was now judged unfavorably by the Dauphin. The French troops turned back, contributing to the eventual Swiss victory in the Old Zürich War. The actions of the Swiss were praised as heroic by contemporary observers, and reports of the event quickly spread throughout Europe.

The Dauphin formally made peace with the Swiss Confederacy and Basel in a treaty signed at Ensisheim on 28 October, and withdrew his troops from the Alsace in the spring of 1445. The intervention of the Church Council being held in the city of Basel at that time was crucial in instigating this peace: the Swiss Confederates were allies of the city of Basel, and so the Dauphin's war could also be construed as an aggressive act against the Council housed within its walls. Charles VII of France had implemented the reformist decrees of the Council of Basel in 1438, so it was important for the Dauphin not to appear to be threatening its members.

In terms of military tactics, the battle exposed the weakness of pike formations against artillery, marking the beginning of the era of gunpowder warfare.

== Legacy in Swiss historiography and patriotism ==
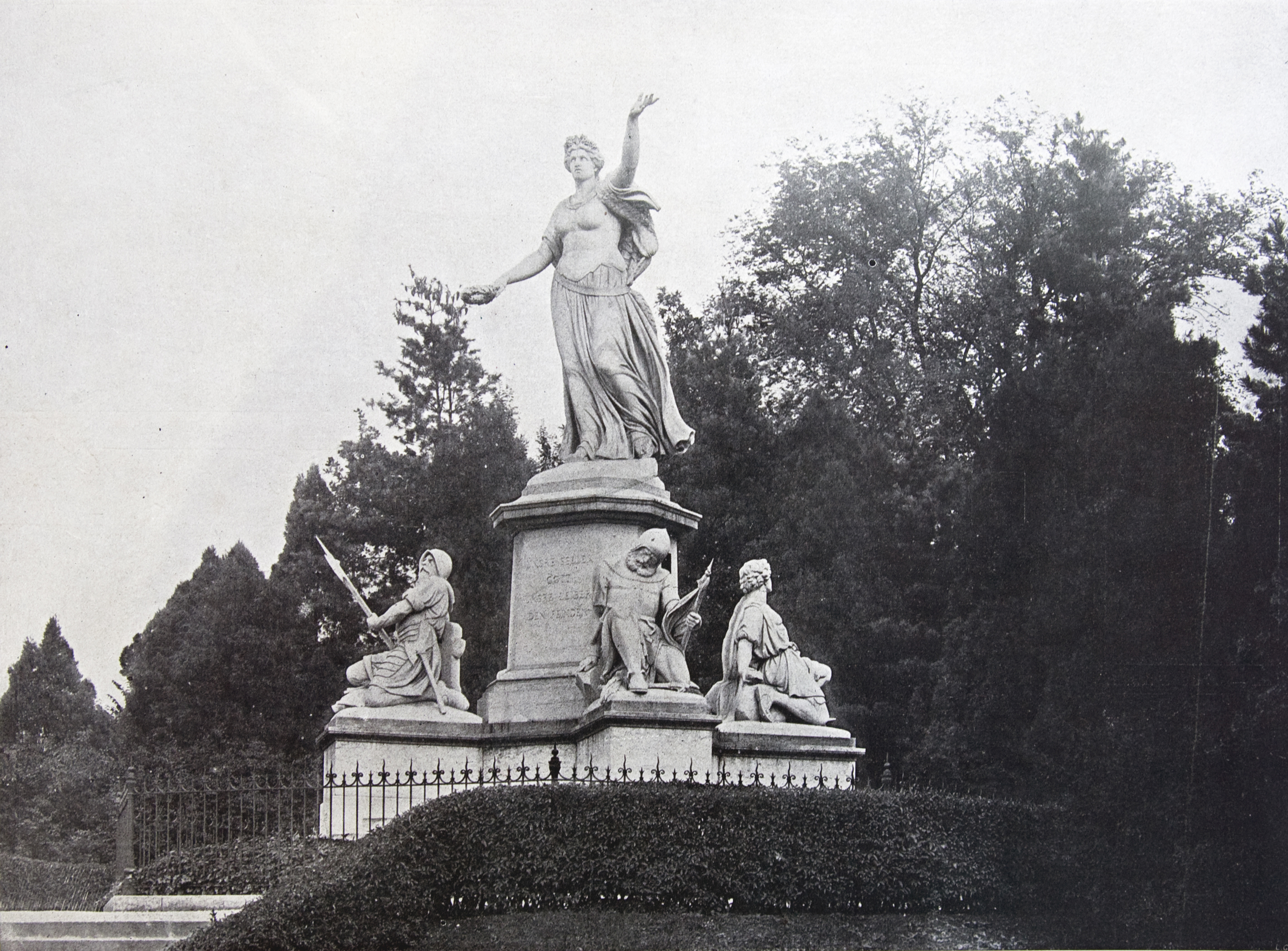
Memorial for the Battle of St. Jakob an der Birs of Ferdinand Schlöth

While the sheer bravery or foolhardiness on the Swiss side was recognized by contemporaries, it was only in the 19th century, after the collapse of the Napoleonic Helvetic Republic, that the battle came to be stylized as a kind of Swiss Thermopylae, a heroic and selfless rescue of the fatherland from a French invasion.

The battle became a symbol of Swiss military bravery in the face of overwhelming odds. It was celebrated in 19th-century Swiss patriotism, finding explicit mention in Rufst du, mein Vaterland, the Swiss national anthem from the 1850s to 1961. The first monument at the battle site was erected in 1824, the current monument by Ferdinand Schlöth dates to 1872. Memorial ceremonies at the site were held from 1824, from 1860 to 1894 yearly, and afterward every five years (discontinued after 1994).

The death of knight Burkhard VII. Münch, according to the chroniclers at the hands of a dying Swiss fighter, became symbolic of the outcome of the battle and the strategy of deterring powers of superior military strength from invading Switzerland by the threat of inflicting disproportionate casualties even in defeat, pursued by Swiss high command during the World Wars.

== See also ==
- List of battles of the Old Swiss Confederacy
