= Walhalla (memorial) =

Neo-classical memorial in Donaustauf, Bavaria

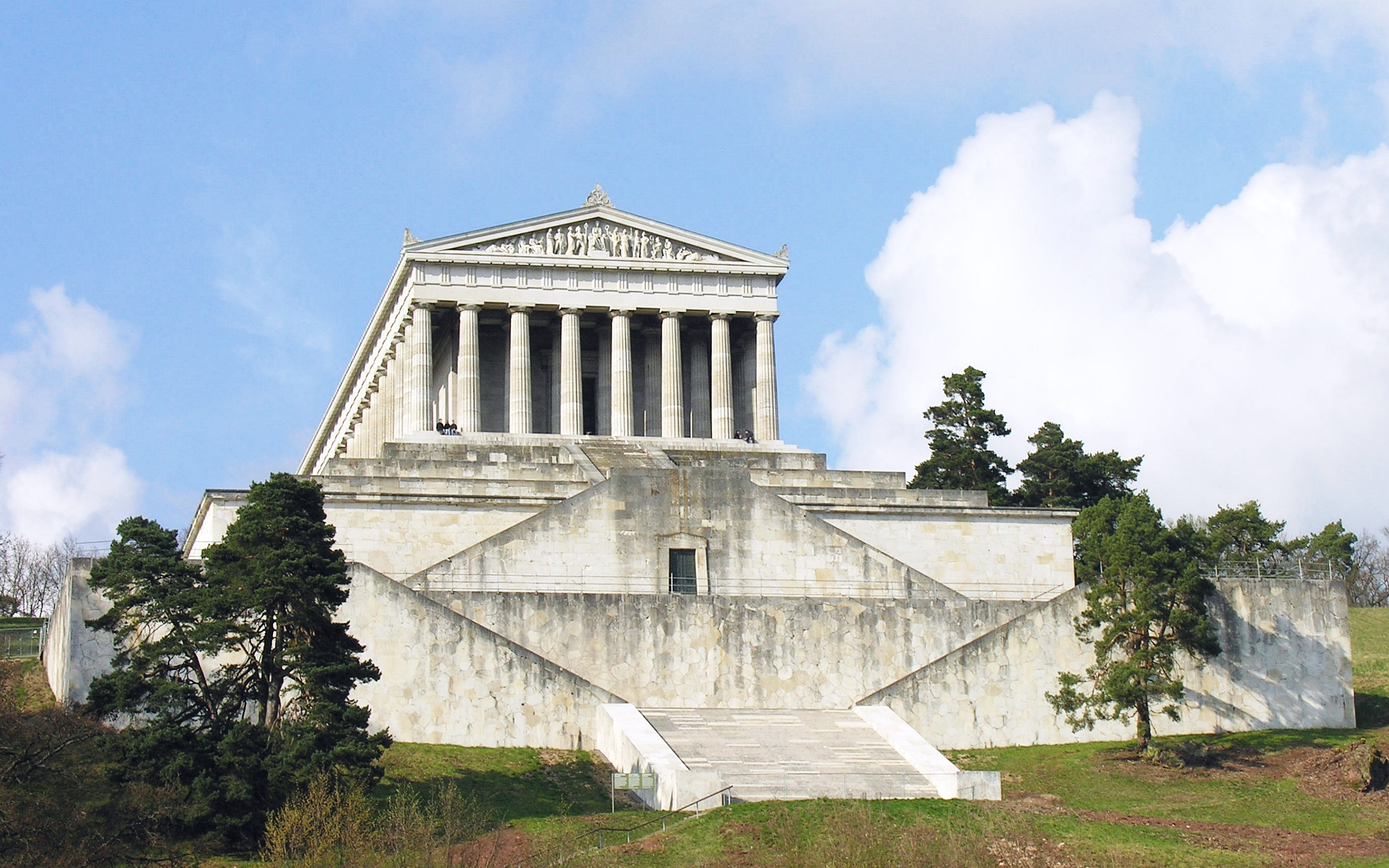
- Walhalla, seen from the Danube River

- Location within Germany

General information
- Coordinates: 49°01′53″N 12°13′27″E

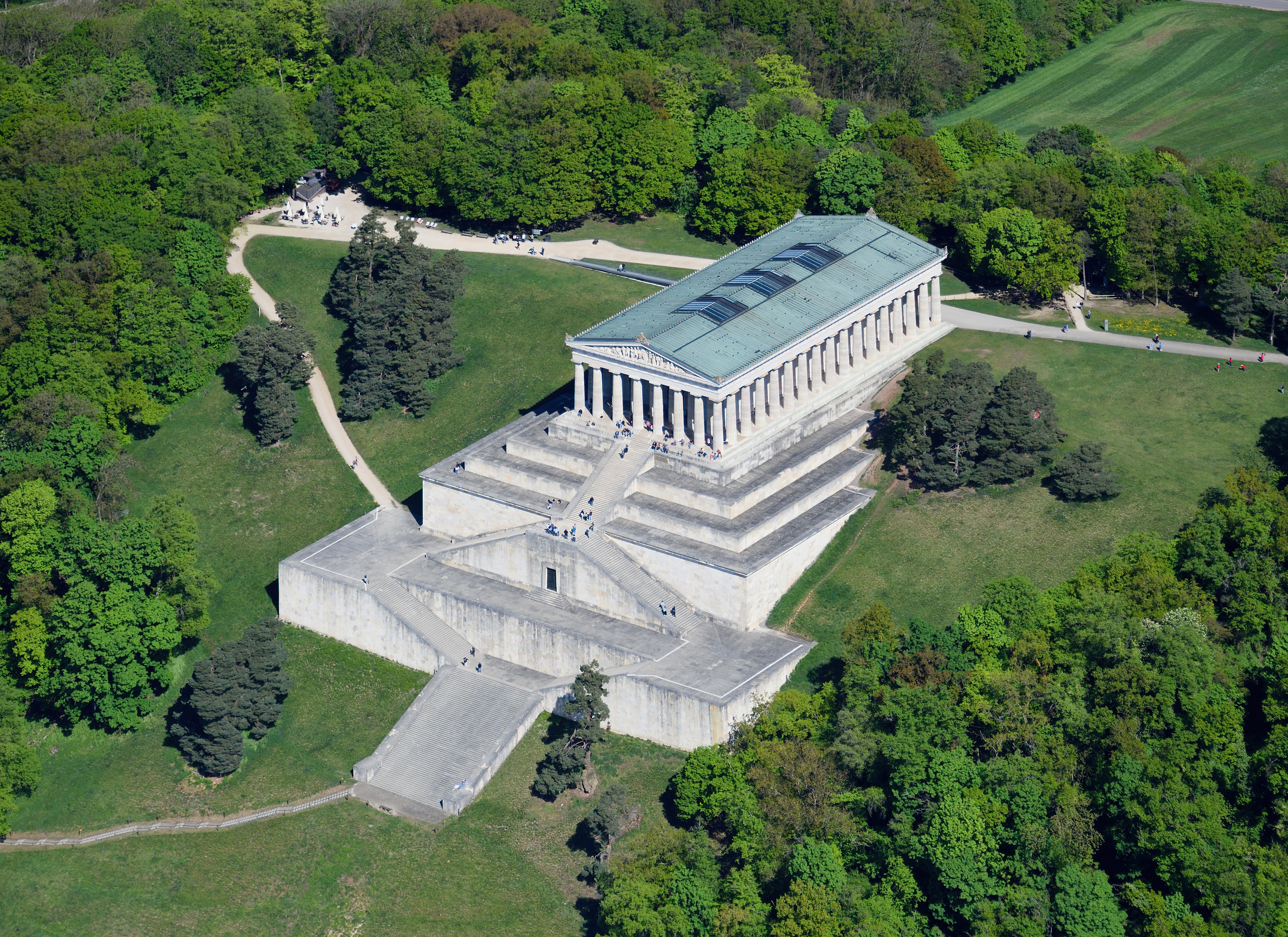
Aerial view of the Walhalla memorial

Walhalla (German pronunciation: [valˈhala]) is a hall of fame monument in Bavaria (Note: Close to Sulzbach an der Donau, which is part of the municipality of Donaustauf in the district of Regensburg, Bavaria) that honours laudable and distinguished people in German history – "politicians, sovereigns, scientists and artists of the German tongue"; While all new inductees since 1890 have been Germans or German-speakers, several earlier honorees came from outside modern Germany, which had not yet been established when the monument was built. Their inclusion reflects a 19th-century, still evolving, more loosely defined concept of "Germanness", one that would today be seen as conflating the term "German" with the much broader notion of having spoken a Germanic language or being of partial or supposed German ancestry.

The Walhalla memorial is named for the Valhǫll of Norse Paganism. It was conceived in 1807 by Crown Prince Ludwig I of Bavaria in order to support the gathering momentum for the unification of the many German states into the German Empire. Following his accession to the throne of Bavaria, construction took place between 1830 and 1842 under the supervision of the architect Leo von Klenze. The memorial displays some 65 plaques and 130 busts covering 2,000 years of history, beginning with Arminius, victor at the Battle of the Teutoburg Forest in the year 9 AD.

The entire system including the substructure is 125 meters long and 55 meters high, the shape of complex is a Greek temple in the style of a Doric Peripteros. The roof is supported by an iron structure that was ultra-modern for the time. The length of the classicist temple building is 66.7 meters, the width is 31.6 meters, and the height is 20 meters. The fully sculptural gable field on the north side, designed by Christian Daniel Rauch and executed by Ludwig von Schwanthaler, shows on the left the Germanic tribes under Arminius in the battle in the Teutoburg Forest against the Romans attacking from the west right. The southern gable represents Germany's liberation in 1814, in the middle Germania, from the left and right the German states and federal fortresses approach in homage, in the spandrel the border rivers Rhine and Moselle are symbolized. Inside, Walhalla is 48.5 meters long, 14 meters wide and 15.5 meters high. The surrounding frieze by Martin von Wagner depicts the early history of the Germanic peoples, their departure from the Caucasus and their immigration into Central Europe. The final stage is the conversion to the Christian faith by Saint Boniface. In addition to its decorative function, the history frieze also serves as a visual separation between the lower bust zone and the upper panel zone. There are also twelve marble armchairs in the interior, which were created by the sculptor Ernst Mayer, and eight marble candlesticks.

== History ==
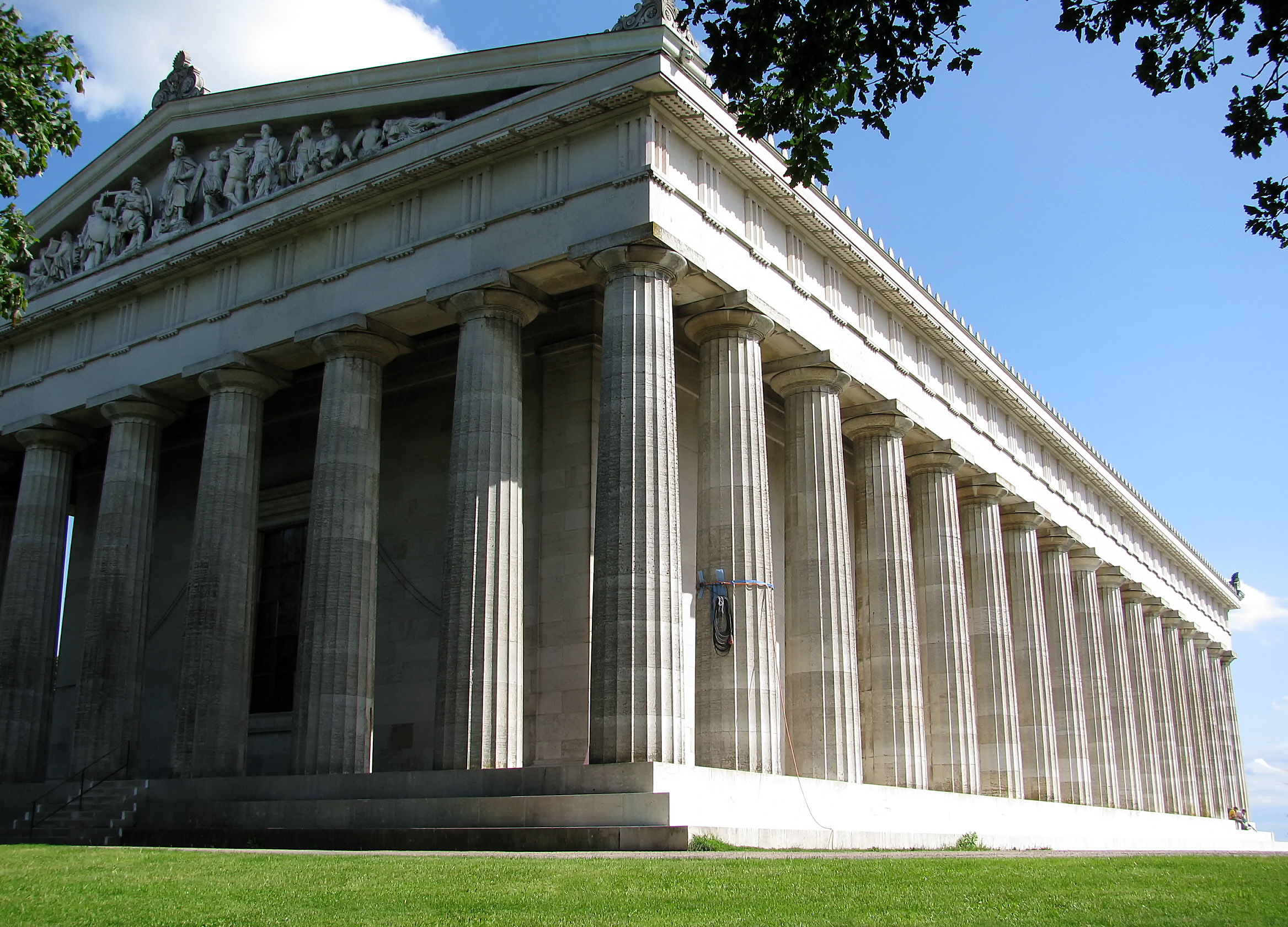
Exterior view of the Walhalla memorial from northwest

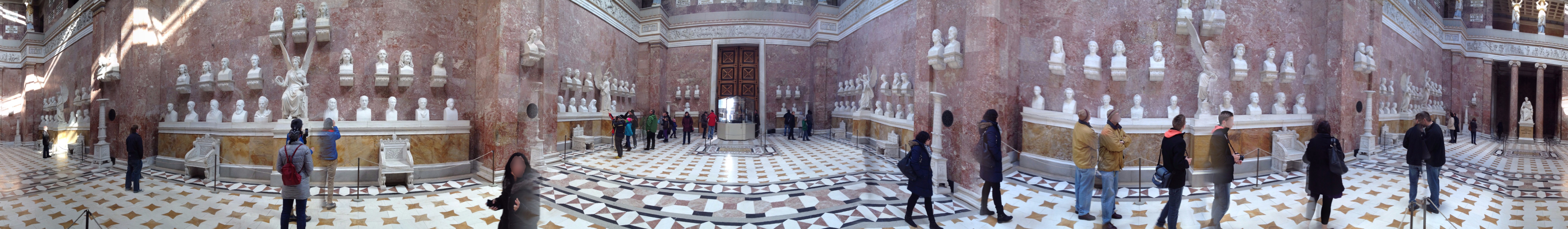
360-degree panoramic view inside the Walhalla memorial

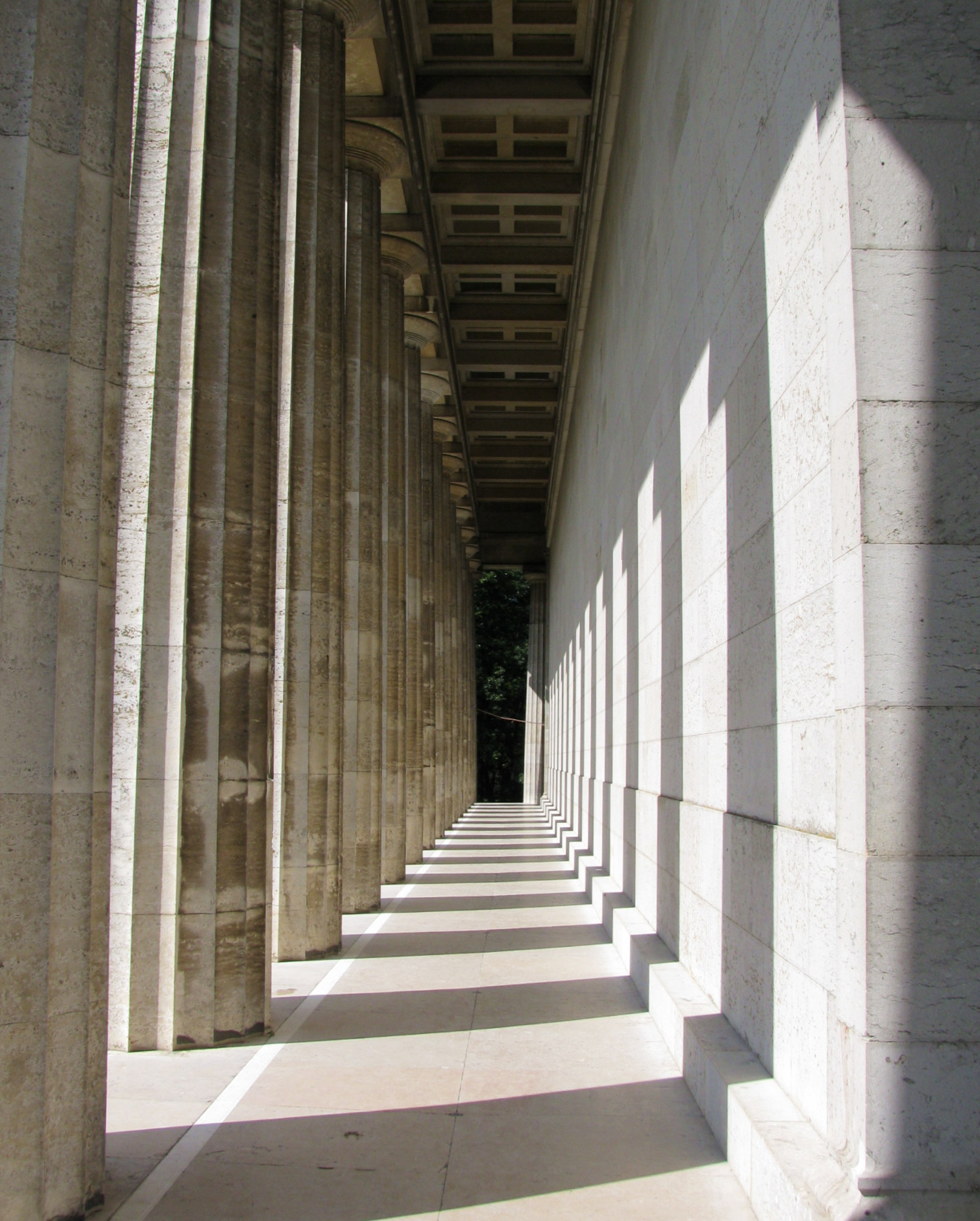
Walhalla colonnade

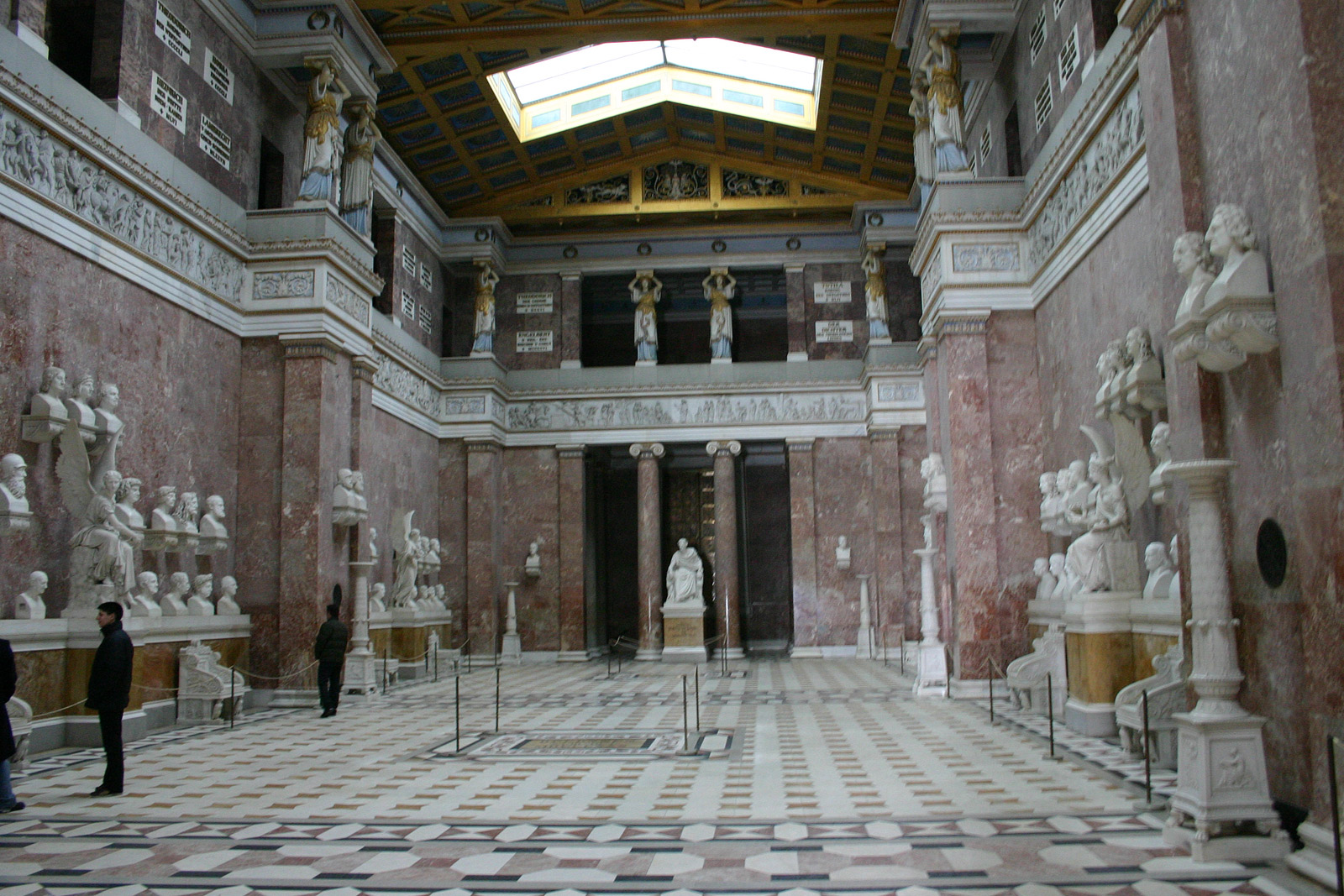
Walhalla main hall

By 1806 Napoleon's First French Empire had annexed German lands along the Rhine River and the North Sea. Central German states formed the Confederation of the Rhine, which sided with Napoleon. Francis II, Holy Roman Emperor, then formally dissolved the Holy Roman Empire of the German Nation (6 August 1806) and instead styled himself Emperor of Austria. The War of the Fourth Coalition (1806–1807) pitted German forces on both sides against each other, and Napoleon again prevailed.

In 1807, 20-year-old Crown Prince Ludwig of the Kingdom of Bavaria (newly elevated from Electorate to Kingdom by Napoleon in 1806), had the idea of reminding all Germans of their common heritage – of the great figures and events in ethnic German history. He commissioned several sculptors to create busts of famous individuals of his choice. Johann Gottfried Schadow's bust of Copernicus became one of the first completed, in 1807. Further suggestions for individuals to be honoured were solicited in 1808 from Swiss historian Johannes von Müller.

By the time of Crown Prince Ludwig's coronation as King Ludwig I of Bavaria in 1825, 60 busts had been completed. In 1826 Ludwig commissioned the construction of a memorial above the Danube River, near Regensburg, modelled after the Parthenon in Athens. The southern pediment frieze features the 1815 creation of the German Confederation; the northern pediment frieze features scenes from the Battle of the Teutoburg Forest of 9 AD. According to Pictorial Travels Continentally Described (circa 1892), the construction of the building cost £666,666.

A two thaler coin was minted commemorating the opening of Walhalla, Krause catalog number KM# 811. It is moderately scarce.

At Walhalla's inauguration on 18 October 1842, there were 96 busts, plus 64 plaques for persons or events of which no portrait was available on which to model a sculpture. When the memorial was opened in 1842, Guido von Lessner authored a poem about Germany's greatness which was set to music by Joseph Hartmann Stuntz.

Since being "of the German tongue" was the main selection criterion for the original 160 persons representing the 1,800 years of German history, the king included individuals of the wider Germanic sphere, including ancient Germanic notables as well as people from the Holy Roman Empire. Whereas the Valhalla of Norse mythology served as home to those gloriously slain in battle, Ludwig intended his Walhalla not only for warriors but also for scientists, writers, and clerics, and specifically included both men and women. Decades before the foundation of the modern German state in 1871 or the clear formation of a modern German identity, "German" was initially understood as "Germanic" and included all ancient Germanic peoples as well as medieval Dutch, Swedish, Russian, and modern Austrian and Swiss figures.

Leo von Klenze's plans reveal the purpose of the subterranean level set within the foundation, the entrance to which is visible from the Danube River. The Central Aisle leads to the Hall of Expectations (Halle der Erwartungen), which was meant to house busts of individuals considered worthy of joining Walhalla, but who were still living at the time of their busts' creation. These busts would be ceremoniously carried into Walhalla following the deaths of the subjects. The Hall of Expectations was abandoned owing to changes in criteria for induction into Walhalla.

The first addition to the collection was the bust of Martin Luther. Ludwig, a devout Catholic, had hesitated to include Luther. Several of the sculptors, including Ohnmacht and Schadow, had urged the king to include Luther, as did Johannes von Müller. Ludwig finally commissioned Luther's bust in 1831 from Ernst Friedrich Rietschel. It was not included at the inauguration of Walhalla in 1842, but added in 1848 by Ludwig himself. Luther's bust was placed just after the last of the original busts (Goethe's), disregarding the chronological arrangement by year of death.

Four further additions were made during Ludwig's lifetime: Archduke Charles, Duke of Teschen (died 1847, added 1853), Josef Wenzel Graf Radetzky von Radetz (died 1858, added in the same year), Friedrich Schelling (died 1854, added 1860) and Ludwig van Beethoven (added 1866).

In 1853, King Ludwig I established an additional Hall of Fame in Munich, specifically for Bavarians – the Ruhmeshalle. Nine of the Bavarian enshrinees have since become Walhalla enshrinees. Their busts in the Ruhmeshalle were destroyed in 1944, during a bombing raid, and have not been replaced. Instead, a plaque with their names tells of their transfer to Walhalla. King Ludwig I himself, who commissioned the Liberation Hall and other monuments, was also enshrined both at Walhalla and in the Ruhmeshalle.

Helmuth von Moltke the Elder was the last addition of a military leader (in 1910). After World War I, new additions focussed on artists and intellectuals. Beginning in 1933, when Kraft durch Freude and other National Socialist organizations promoted trips to Walhalla, visitor numbers increased exponentially. In 1937, when Hitler unveiled a Bruckner bust, 131,520 were counted. The Walhalla memorial was reached by the Allied invasion of Germany in April 1945.

Additions since 1945 are proposed by private individuals or private foundations, who will also pay for the production of the new bust. Suggestions are reviewed by the Bavarian Academy of Sciences, based on which a recommendation is made by the Bavarian Ministry of the Interior. The final decision lies with the Bavarian Council of Ministers. Official practice since 1945 has been to favour "eminent figures from science or art, or individuals with extraordinary social or caritative merit".

Nineteen busts have been added between 1945 and 2022, for an average interval of a little below four years between additions:

- Max Reger (1948)
- Adalbert Stifter (1954)
- Joseph von Eichendorff (1957)
- Wilhelm Conrad Röntgen (1959)
- Max von Pettenkofer (1962)
- Jakob Fugger (1967)
- Jean Paul (1973)
- Richard Strauss (1973)
- Carl Maria von Weber (1978)
- Gregor Mendel (1983)
- Albert Einstein (1990)
- Karolina Gerhardinger (1998)
- Konrad Adenauer (1999)
- Johannes Brahms (2000)
- Sophie Scholl (2003)
- Carl Friedrich Gauss (2007)
- Edith Stein (2009)
- Heinrich Heine (2010)
- Käthe Kollwitz (2018)
- Max Planck (2022)

== List of people ==
=== Busts ===
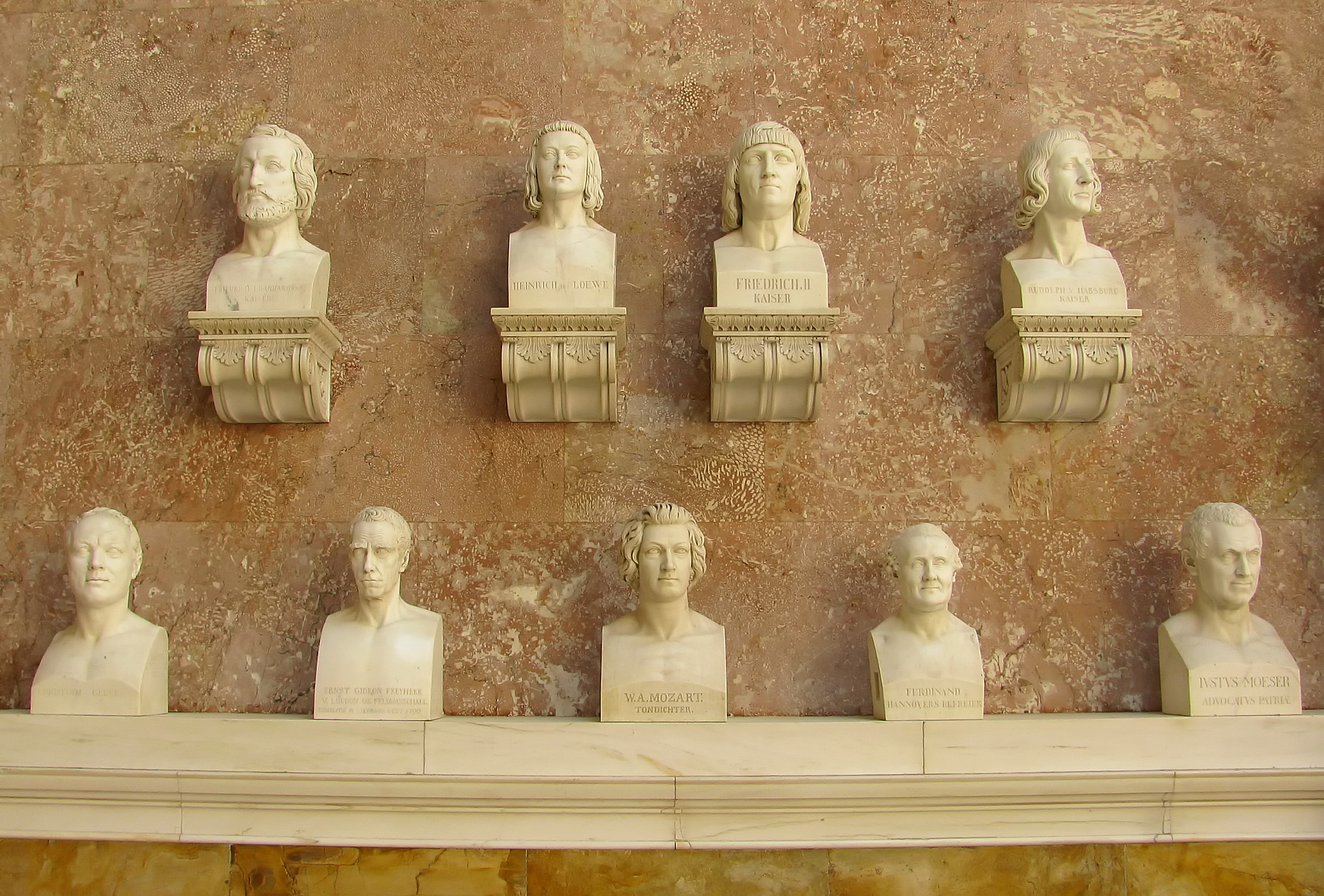
Upper row: Frederick Barbarossa, Henry the Lion, Frederick II "Stupor Mundi", Rudolf I of Habsburg Lower row: Ernst Gideon Freiherr von Laudon, Wolfgang Amadeus Mozart, Duke Karl Wilhelm Ferdinand of Brunswick-Lüneburg, Justus Möser, Gottfried August Bürger.

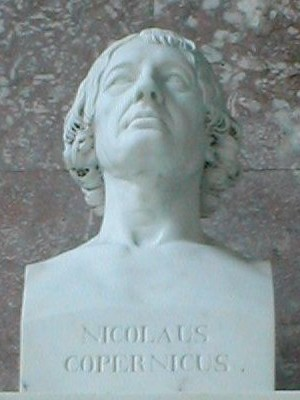
Copernicus, by Schadow (1807, No. 52)

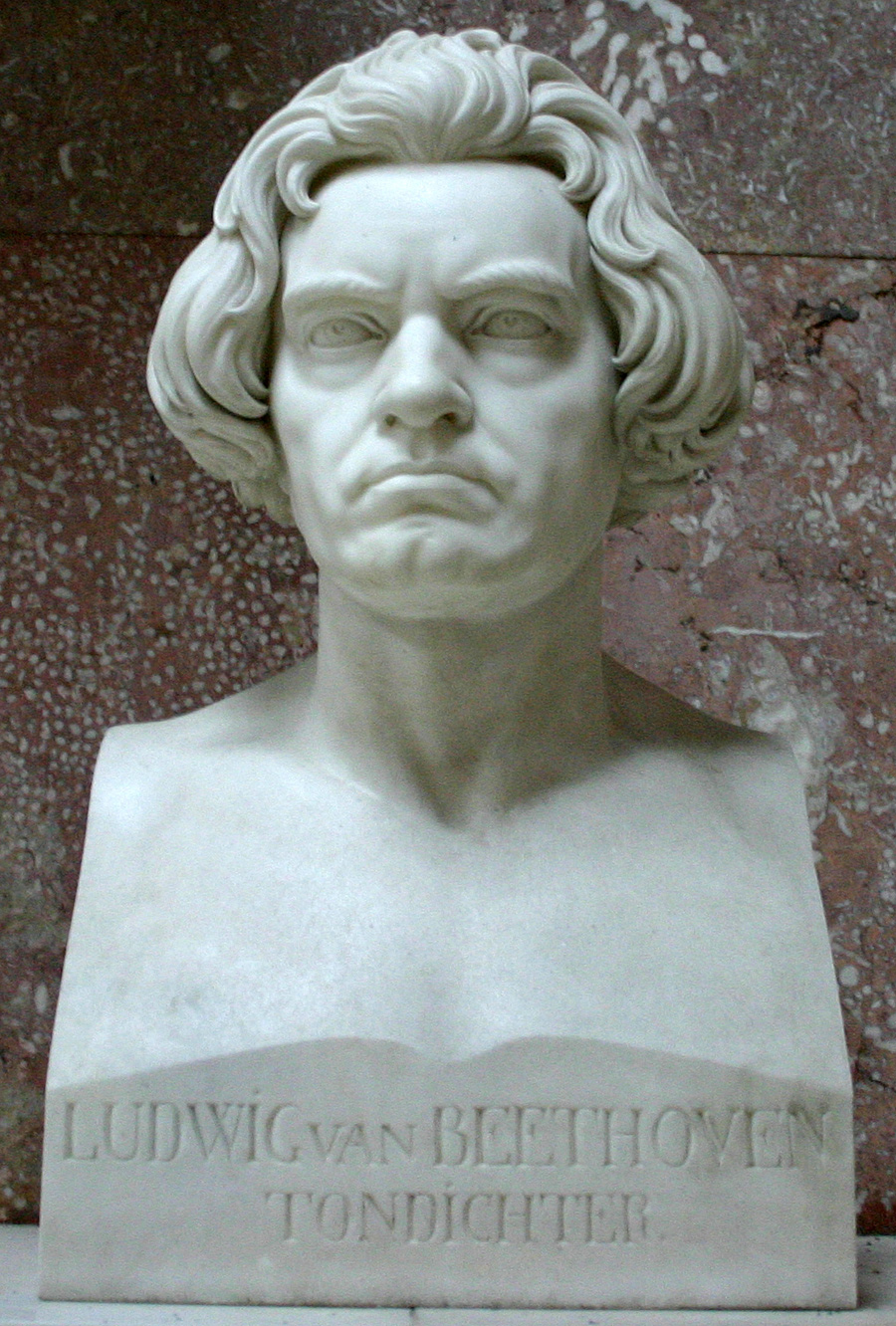
Ludwig van Beethoven (No. 65)

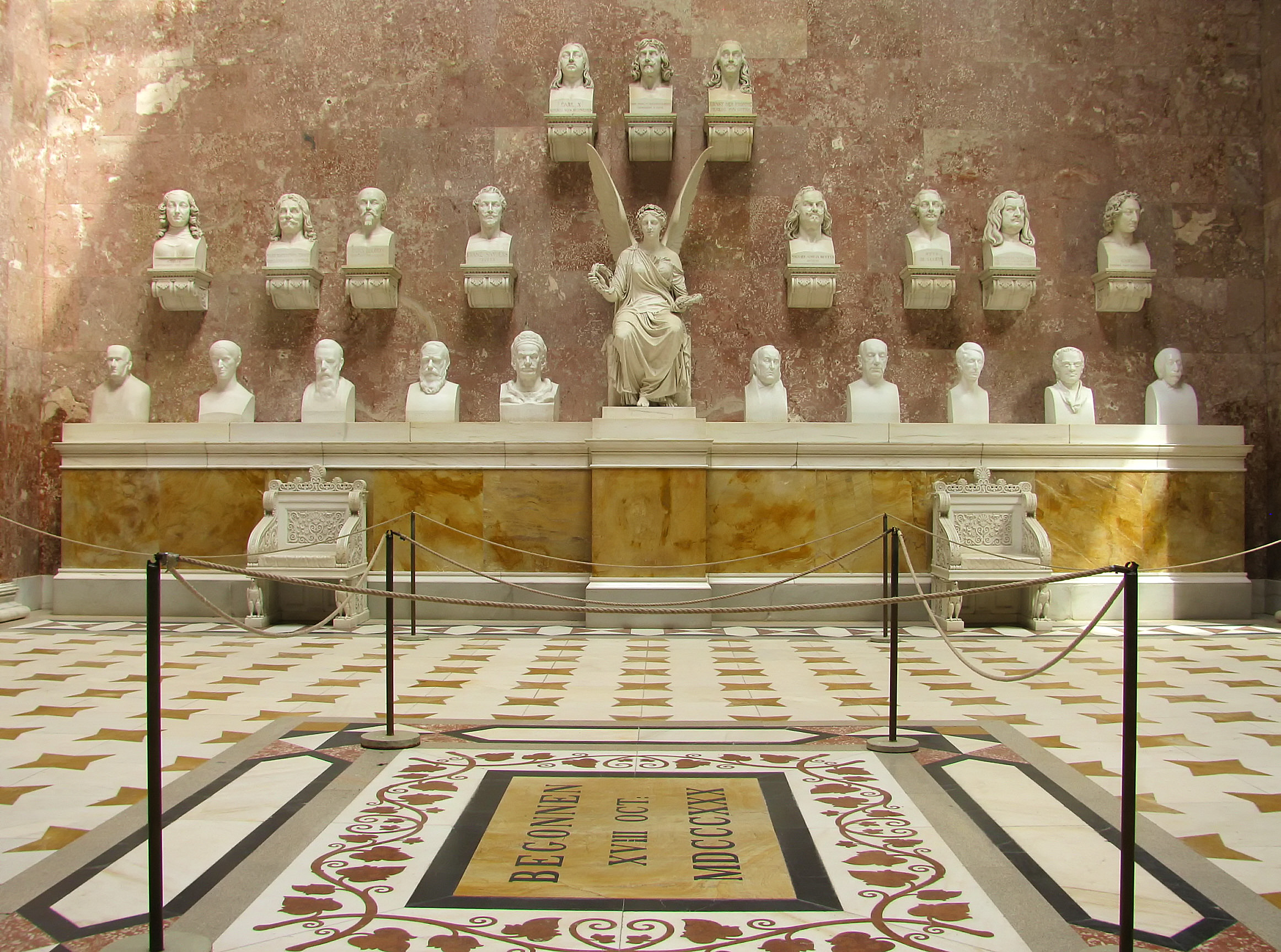
The fifth bust group (No. 90 to 110)

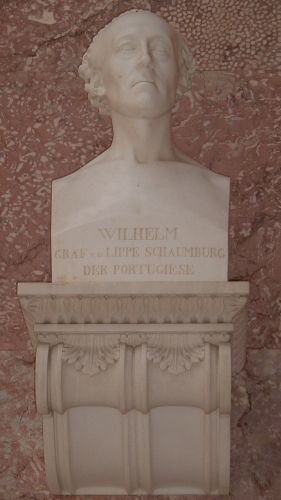
Wilhelm Graf zu Schaumburg-Lippe (No. 124)

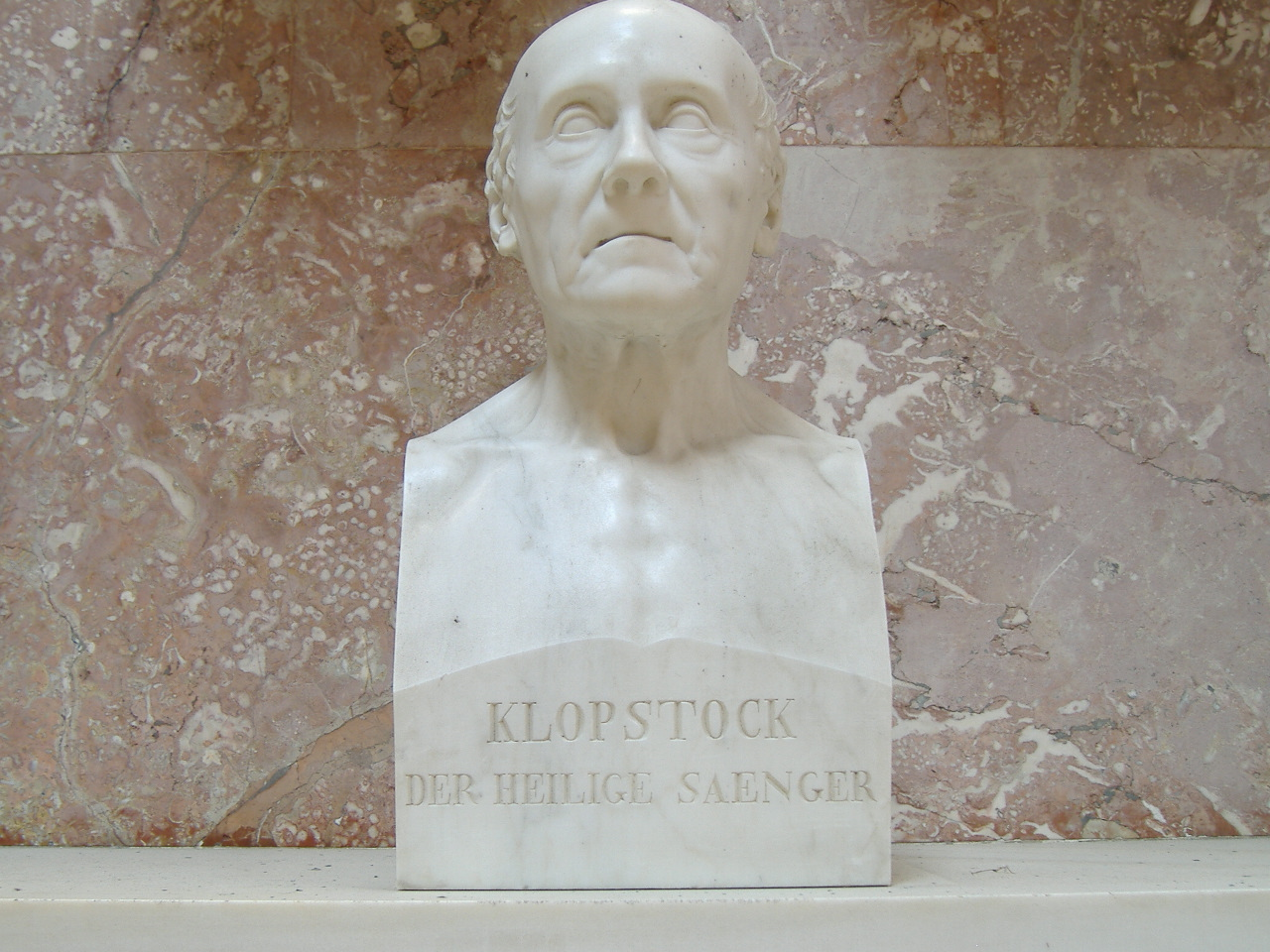
Friedrich Gottlieb Klopstock

The original busts are arranged in rows by date of death At the inauguration in 1842, a total of 96 busts were arranged, in two rows, in chronological order (by year of death), beginning with Henry the Fowler (d. 936) and ending with Goethe (d. 1832). The upper row comprised 70 busts, beginning with Henry the Fowler and ending with Maria Theresa. The lower row comprised a total of 26 busts of modern scholars, beginning with Lessing and ending with Goethe.

==== Upper row ====
Busts to the left of the statue of Ludwig I
1. Henry the Fowler – Duke of Saxony and King of the Germans (1809)
2. Otto I, Holy Roman Emperor (Schadow, 1809)
3. Conrad II, Holy Roman Emperor (Schadow, 1809)
6. Frederick I, Holy Roman Emperor (Schwanthaler, 1838)
7. Henry the Lion – Duke of Saxony and Bavaria (Schadow, 1811)
8. Frederick II, Holy Roman Emperor (Tieck, 1814)
9. Rudolf I of Habsburg (Tieck, 1832)
15. Erwin von Steinbach – architect of Strasbourg Cathedral (Ohmacht, 1811)
16. Johannes Gutenberg – inventor of movable type (Matthiä, 1835)
17. Jan van Eyck – Flemish painter (Tieck, 1817–1842)
18. Frederick I, Elector Palatine – the Victorious (Lossow, 1842)
24. Johannes Müller Regiomontanus (d. 1476) – astronomer and mathematician (Lossow, 1842)
25. Nicholas of Flüe – Swiss hermit, ascetic and mystic (Tieck, 1812)
26. Eberhard I, Duke of Württemberg (Wagner, 1830)
27. Hans Memling – Flemish painter (Woltreck, 1841)
28. Johann von Dalberg – Bishop of Worms (second bust by Lossow, added after 1867)
29. Hans von Hallwyl – Swiss commander at the Battle of Morat (Christen, 1812)
35. Berthold von Henneberg – Elector and Archbishop of Mainz (Mayer, 1824)
36. Maximilian I, Holy Roman Emperor (P. Kaufmann, 1811)
37. Johannes von Reuchlin – German philosopher and humanist (Imhof, 1835)
38. Franz von Sickingen – leader of the Knights' War (von Bandel, 1827)
39. Ulrich von Hutten – German knight and Renaissance humanist (Kirchmayer, 1811)
40. Albrecht Dürer – printmaker and painter (Rauch, 1837)
41. Georg von Frundsberg – military leader (Widnmann, 1841)
47. Peter Vischer the Elder – German sculptor (F. Müller, 1839)
48. Johannes Aventinus (Johann Georg Turmair) – Bavarian scholar and historian (Horchler, 1841)
49. Wolter von Plettenberg – German Master of the Livonian Brothers of the Sword (L. Schwanthaler, 1832)
50. Erasmus of Rotterdam – Dutch humanist (Tieck, 1813)
51. Paracelsus (Theophrast von Hohenheim) – Swiss physician and alchemist (E. Wolff, 1827)
52. Nicolaus Copernicus – astronomer (Schadow, 1807)
58. Hans Holbein the Younger – German painter (Lossow, 1840)
59. Charles V, Holy Roman Emperor (Schwanthaler, 1842)
60. Christoph, Duke of Württemberg (Bissen, 1831)
61. Aegidius Tschudi – Swiss historian (Tieck, 1817)
67. William I of Orange – leader of the Dutch Revolt (Tieck, 1815)

68. Statue of Ludwig I of Bavaria (1890)

Busts to the right of the statue of Ludwig I
69. August II the Strong – Elector of Saxony and King of Poland (Rietschel, 1840)
70. Julius Echter von Mespelbrunn – Bishop of Würzburg (Scholl, 1840)
71. Maurice of Orange – captain-general of the army of the Dutch Republic (Tieck, 1815)
72. Johannes Kepler – mathematician and astronomer (Schöpf, 1842)
73. Albrecht von Wallenstein – Bohemian general in the Thirty Years' War (Tieck, 1812)
79. Bernhard of Saxe-Weimar – general in the Thirty Years' War (Tieck, 1812/13)
80. Peter Paul Rubens – Flemish painter (Lamine, 1809)
81. Anthony van Dyck – Flemish painter and engraver (Rauch, 1812)
82. Hugo Grotius – Dutch jurist (Tieck, 1814)
88. Maximilian von und zu Trauttmansdorff – Austrian diplomat that negotiated the Peace of Westphalia (Schaller, 1824)
89. Maximilian I – Prince-elector of Bavaria (Imhof, 1832)
90. Amalie Elisabeth – Countess of Hesse-Kassel (Tieck, 1817)
91. Maarten Harpertszoon Tromp – Dutch admiral (Kessels, 1825)
92. Paris Graf von Lodron – Archbishop of Salzburg (Eberhard, 1814)
93. Frans Snyders – Flemish painter (Rauch, 1814)
99. Charles X Gustav – King of Sweden (Tieck, 1816)
100. Johann Philipp von Schönborn – Archbishop and Prince-elector of Mainz (Tieck, 1818)
101. Ernst I – the Pious, Duke of Saxe-Gotha and Saxe-Altenburg (Tieck, 1815)
102. Michiel Adriaenszoon de Ruyter – Dutch admiral (Tieck, 1817)
103. Otto von Guericke – scientist and inventor (Rathgeber, 1811)
104. Frederick William, Elector of Brandenburg – the Great Elector (Wichmann, 1828)
105. Charles V, Duke of Lorraine (Tieck, 1817)
111. William III of Orange – Dutch Stadtholder and King of England (Haller, 1816)
112. Ludwig Wilhelm von Baden – Türkenlouis, Imperial commander (Widnmann, 1842)
113. Gottfried Wilhelm Leibniz – philosopher and mathematician (Schadow, 1808)
114. Herman Boerhaave – Dutch humanist and physician (Leeb, 1823)
115. Maurice of Saxony – German commander and military strategist (Tieck, 1813)
116. Georg Friedrich Händel (1685–1759) – composer (Schadow, 1815)
122. Nikolaus Ludwig von Zinzendorf – religious and social reformer, founder and bishop of the Moravian Church (Tieck, 1818)
123. Burkhard Christoph von Münnich – German field marshal in Russian service (Lossow, 1841)
124. Johann Joachim Winckelmann – archeologist and art writer (R. Schadow, 1814)
125. William, Count of Schaumburg-Lippe – commander of his army in the Seven Years' War and for Portugal (Schadow, 1809)
127. Albrecht von Haller – Swiss anatomist and physiologist (Schadow, 1808)
128. Raphael Mengs – Danish-German painter (Rauch, 1808)
129. Maria Theresa of Austria – Queen of Hungary and Bohemia, Holy Roman Empress (Eberhard, 1811/2)

==== Lower row ====
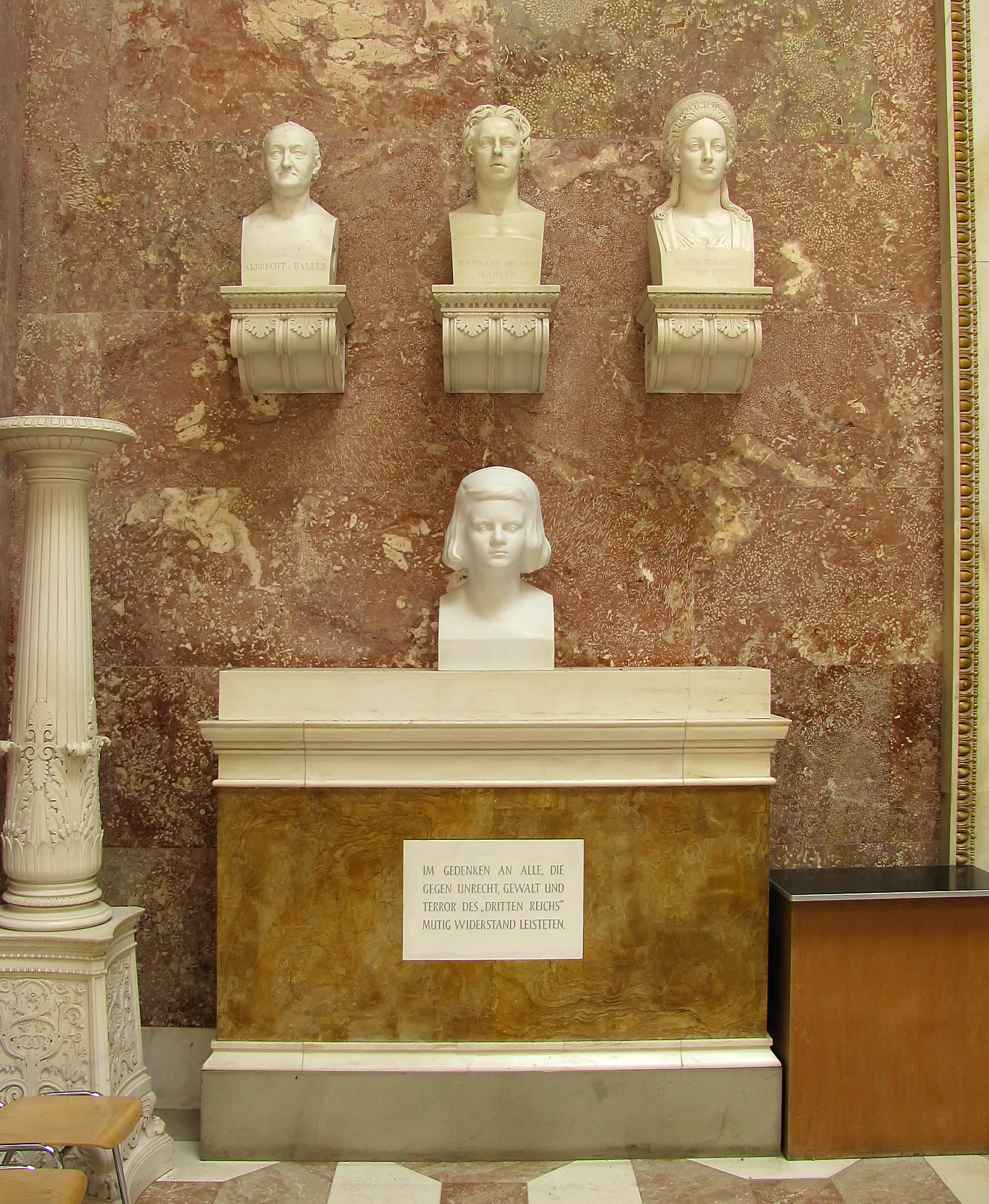
Upper row: Albrecht von Haller, Raphael Mengs, Maria Theresia; Lower row: Sophie Scholl.

Busts to the left of the statue of Ludwig I
4. Gotthold Ephraim Lessing – poet (Tieck, 1813)
5. Frederick the Great – King of Prussia, military leader (Schadow, 1807)
10. Christoph Willibald Gluck – composer (Dannecker, 1812)
11. Ernst Gideon Freiherr von Laudon – Austrian field marshal from Livonia (Kiesling, 1813)
12. Wolfgang Amadeus Mozart – composer (Schwanthaler, 1846)
13. Karl Wilhelm Ferdinand, Duke of Brunswick-Lüneburg – Prussian Generalfeldmarschall (Schadow, 1808)
14. Justus Möser – jurist and historian (Schmidt von der Launitz, 1821)
19. Gottfried August Bürger – poet (Tieck, 1817)
20. Catherine the Great (Wredow, 1831)
21. Friedrich Gottlieb Klopstock – poet (Schadow, 1808)
22. Johann Jakob Wilhelm Heinse – poet and scholar (Haller/Mayer, 1826)
23. Johann Gottfried Herder – poet and philosopher (Tieck, 1815)
30. Immanuel Kant – philosopher (Schadow, 1808)
31. Friedrich Schiller – poet (Dannecker, 1794)
32. Joseph Haydn – composer (Robatz, 1810)
33. Johannes von Müller – Swiss historian (Schadow, 1808)
34. Christoph Martin Wieland – poet (Schadow, 1807)
42. Gerhard von Scharnhorst – Prussian general (Rauch, 1830)
43. Michael Andreas Barclay de Tolly – Russian Field Marshal (Widnmann, 1841)
44. Gebhard Leberecht von Blücher – Prussian Generalfeldmarschall (Rauch, 1817)
45. Karl Philipp Fürst zu Schwarzenberg – Austrian field marshal (Schaller, 1821)
46. Friedrich Wilhelm Herschel – astronomer (Eberhard, 1816)
53. Hans Karl von Diebitsch – Russian field marshal, born in Silesia
54. Karl vom und zum Stein – Prussian politician (1825)
55. August Graf Neidhardt von Gneisenau – Prussian field marshal (1842)
56. Johann Wolfgang von Goethe – poet and polymath (1808)
57. Martin Luther (1848) – leader of the Reformation, translator of the Bible into German
62. Archduke Charles, Duke of Teschen (1853)
63. Josef Wenzel Graf Radetzky von Radetz – Bohemian military leader (1858)
64. Friedrich Schelling – German philosopher (1860)
65. Ludwig van Beethoven – composer (Lossow 1866)
66. William I, German Emperor (1898)

68. Statue of Ludwig I of Bavaria (1890)

Busts to the right of the statue of Ludwig I
74. Otto von Bismarck – Chancellor of the North German Confederation and then of the German Empire (1908)
75. Helmuth Graf von Moltke – German Generalfeldmarschall (1910)
76. Richard Wagner – German composer of operas (1913)
77. Johann Sebastian Bach – composer (1916)
78. Justus von Liebig – German chemist (1925)
83. Friedrich Ludwig Jahn (1928)
84. Franz Schubert – Austrian Romantic composer (1925)
85. Joseph Görres (1931)
86. Anton Bruckner – Austrian composer (1937)
87. Max Reger – German composer and organist of the late romantic period (1948)
94. Adalbert Stifter – Austrian-Bohemian writer (1954)
95. Joseph Freiherr von Eichendorff (1957)
96. Wilhelm Conrad Röntgen – German physicist (1959)
97. Max von Pettenkofer – chemist and hygienist (1962)
98. Jakob Fugger – German merchant (1967)
106. Jean Paul (1973)
107. Richard Strauss – German composer (1973)
108. Carl Maria von Weber – German composer (1978)
109. Gregor Mendel – Austrian-Moravian Augustinian friar and naturalist (1983)
110. Albert Einstein – physicist (1990)
117. Karolina Gerhardinger – founder of the School Sisters of Notre Dame (1998)
118. Konrad Adenauer – first Chancellor of West Germany (1999)
119. Johannes Brahms – composer (2000)
120. Carl Friedrich Gauss – mathematician, astronomer, and physicist (2007)
121. Edith Stein – Carmelite nun and philosopher (2009)
126. Heinrich Heine – German Romantic poet (2010)
130. Sophie Scholl – German passive resistance activist against the Nazi regime (2003)

=== Plaques ===
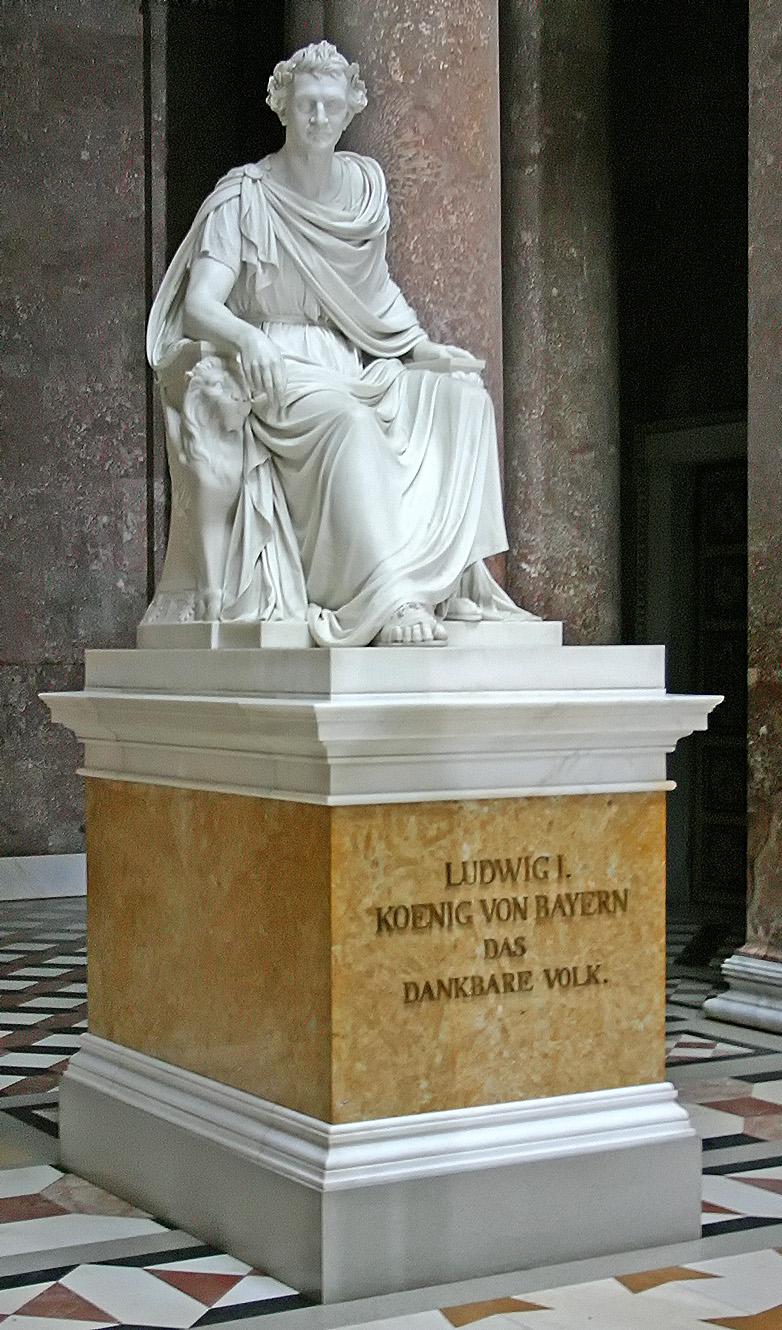
Statue of King Ludwig I (no. 63, 1890), builder of the hall

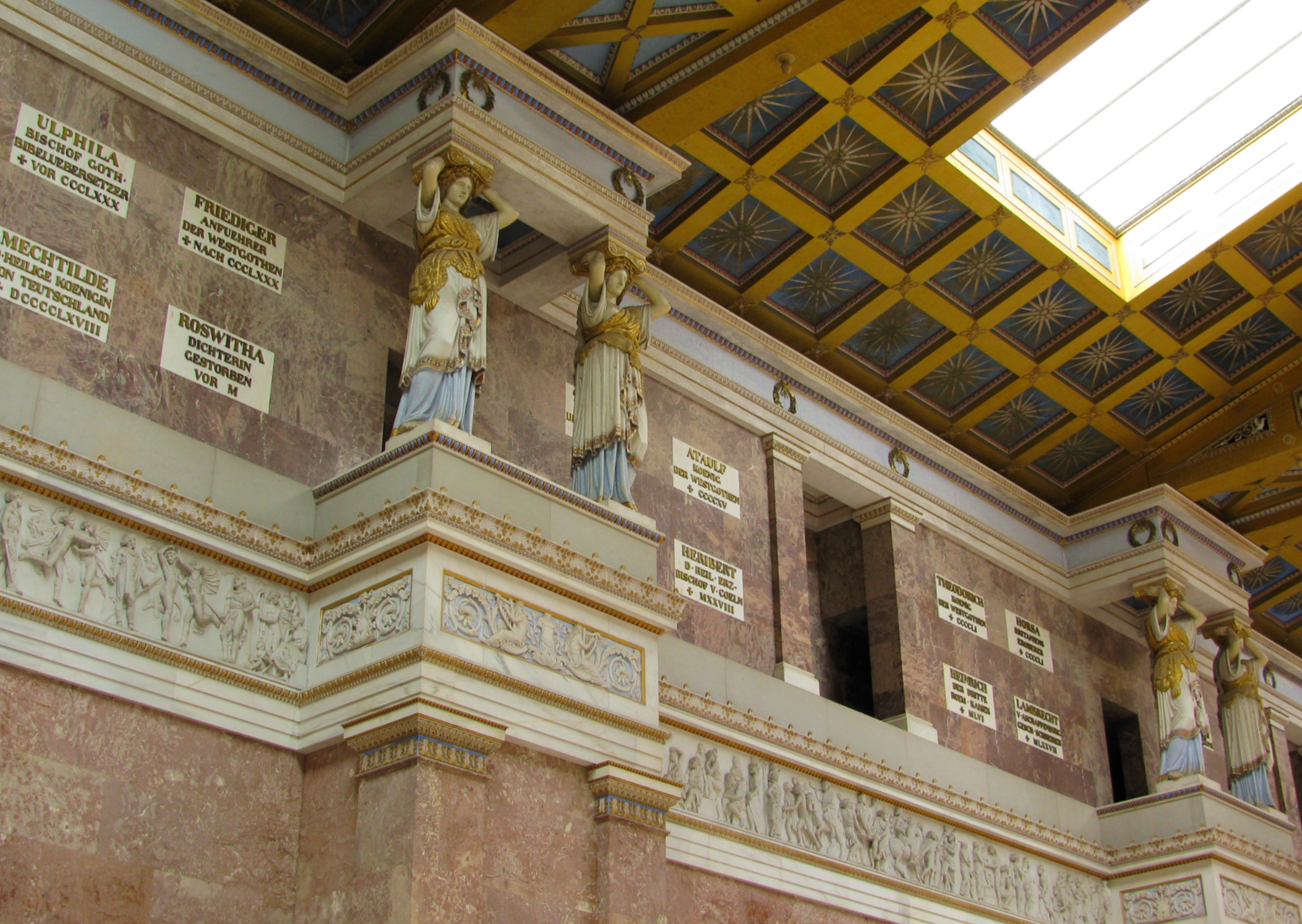
Fritigern, Leader of the Visigoths (second plaque from the top left)

Plaques were made for people (or acts) of which no portraits or descriptions were available to model sculptures after. The timeline spans from Arminius a.k.a. Hermann der Cherusker (born 17 BC) to watchmaker Peter Henlein, who died in 1542. In 2003 a plaque was added to commemorate the German Resistance against Nazi Germany.

Plaque numbers 1–32 represent the upper row, 33–64 the lower row. Each plaque includes a short characterization of the individual, with the year of death given in Roman numerals. The year of death in the table below is that given on the plaque, even where modern historiography suggests a revised date.

Nr	Name	Died	Description
1	Arminius	21	Leader of the Cherusci, victorious at the Battle of the Teutoburg Forest in AD 9.
2	Maroboduus	40	Leader of the Marcomanni
3	Veleda	c. 84–98	Prophetess of the Bructeri
4	Julius Civilis	before 100	Leader of the Batavi
5	Ermanarich	375	King of the Ostrogoths
6	Wulfila	before 380	Apostle of the Goths
7	Fritigern	after 390	Leader of the Tervingi
8	Alaric I	410	King of the Visigoths
9	Athaulf	415	King of the Visigoths
10	Theodoric I	451	King of the Visigoths
11	Horsa	451	Conqueror of Britain
12	Geiseric	477	King of the Vandals
13	Hengest	480	Conqueror of Britain
14	Odoacer	497	King of the Heruli and Gepidae
15	Clovis I	511	King of the Franks
16	Theodoric the Great	526	King of the Ostrogoths
17	Totila	552	King of the Ostrogoths
18	Alboin	573	King of the Lombards
19	Theudelinde	c. 626	Queen of the Lombards
20	Emmeram von Regensburg	680	Bishop and Saint
21	Pippin of Herstal	716	Mayor of the Palace
22	Beda Venerabilis	735	Abbot and historiographer
23	Willibrord	739	Bishop and saint
24	Charles Martel	741	Charles "the Hammer", Duke and Prince of the Franks and Mayor of the Palace
25	Bonifatius	755	Bishop and saint
26	Pippin the Younger	768	King of the Franks
27	Widukind	c. 800	Leader of the Saxons
28	Paulus Diaconus	after 800	Paul Warnefried, historiographer of the Lombards
29	Alcuin	804	Abbot and scholar
30	Ecgberht of Wessex	c. 810	First King of England
31	Charlemagne	814	Charles the Great, Roman Emperor
32	Einhard	839	Historiographer, biographer of Charlemagne
33	Hrabanus Maurus	856	Bishop and scholar
34	Arnulf von Kärnten	900	Roman Emperor
35	Alfred the Great	900	King of England
36	Otto of Saxony	before 919	Duke of Saxony
37	Arnulf of Bavaria	937	Duke of Bavaria
38	Matilda of Ringelheim	968	Queen of Germany and saint
39	Hrotsvitha	before 1000	Dramatist
40	Bernward of Hildesheim	1028	Artist, bishop and saint
41	Heribert von Köln	1028	Bishop and saint
42	Henry III	1056	Holy Roman Emperor
43	Lampert von Hersfeld	1077	Historian
44	Otto von Bamberg	1139	Bishop
45	Otto von Freising	1158	Bishop and historian
46	Hildegard von Bingen	1179	Abbess and saint
47	Otto of Bavaria	1183	Duke of Bavaria
48	Engelbert of Cologne	1226	Bishop and saint
49	The anonymous poet of the Nibelungenlied		
50	Walther von der Vogelweide	1230	Minnesinger
51	Elisabeth von Thüringen	1231	Princess and saint
52	Leopold VI of Austria	1234	Leopold "the Glorious", Duke of Austria
53	Hermann von Salza	1240	Grand Master of the Teutonic Order
54	Wolfram von Eschenbach	1251	Minnesinger
55	Master Gerhard	1271	Architect of Cologne Cathedral
56	Arnold zum Turm	1264	Founder of the Rhenish League of Cities
57	Albertus Magnus	1280	Bishop and scholar
58	Rütlischwur	after 1306	The three men of the Rütli oath, foundation of the Old Swiss Confederacy
59	Friedrich der Schöne	1330	Anti-king during the Interregnum
60	Bruno von Warendorp	1369	Leader of the Hanseatic League
61	Arnold Winkelried	1386	Knight, Swiss hero at Sempach
62	Wilhelm von Köln	1388	Painter
63	Adrian von Bubenberg	1479	Bernese military leader
64	Peter Henlein	1542	Inventor of the pocket watch

The 65th plaque, dedicated to the Widerstand (Resistance) against Nazi Germany, added in 2003, is not part of the two rows of 64 numbered plaques.

== See also ==
- Befreiungshalle (Hall of Liberation, Kelheim, Germany)
- Staatliche Antikensammlungen (Munich, Germany)
- Hermannsdenkmal (Hermann monument, Teutoburg Forest, Germany)
- Ruhmeshalle (Hall of Fame, Munich, Germany)
- Volkshalle, a proposed building

== Sources ==
- Walhalla, official guide booklet, translated by Helen Stellner and David Hiley, Bernhard Bosse Verlag Regensburg, 2002
- Eveline G. Bouwers, Public Pantheons in Revolutionary Europe. Comparing Cultures of Remembrance, c. 1790-1840, Basingstoke 2012, pp. 161–212 (ISBN 978-0-230-29471-4)
- Adalbert Müller: Donaustauf and Walhalla (1846) at archive.org
- Simone Steger, Die Bildnisbüsten der Walhalla bei Donaustauf Von der Konzeption durch Ludwig I. von Bayern zur Ausführung (1807–1842), dissertation, Ludwig-Maximilians-Universität München, Munich (2011).
- Ludwig I of Bavaria, Walhalla's Genossen (1842, 2nd ed. 1847).
