= Georg von Frundsberg =

German military leader (1473–1528)

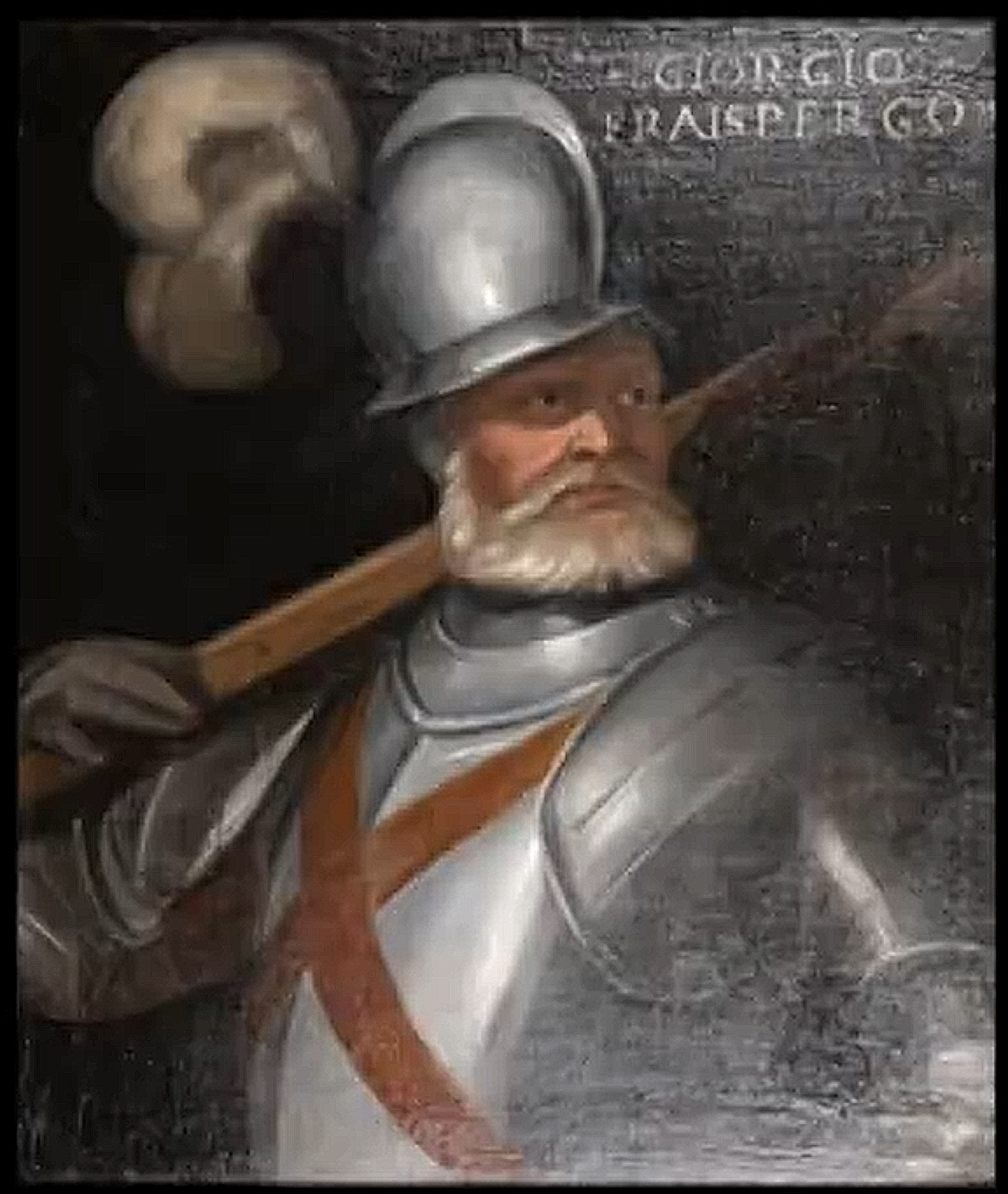
Georg von Frundsberg ("Giorgio Fraispergo"). Painted in 1590-99, Giovio Collection

Georg von Frundsberg (Note: His first name may also be spelled Jörg and his surname Fronsberg or Freundsberg.) (24 September 1473 – 20 August 1528) was a German Knight, military, and Landsknecht leader in the service of the Holy Roman Empire and Imperial House of Habsburg. An early modern proponent of infantry tactics, he established his reputation in active service during the Italian Wars under Emperor Maximilian I and his successor Charles V. Even in his lifetime, he was referred to as "Vater der Landsknechte" (Father of the Landsknechte) and legends about him as the patriarchal figure of the Landsknechte or his incredible physical strength surfaced. He achieved great prestige and fame for his role in the Habsburg victory at Pavia against France and during the war of the League of Cognac.

== Early life ==
Frundsberg was born to Ulrich von Frundsberg, a captain of the Swabian League forces, and his wife Barbara von Rechberg at Mindelheim, into an old line of Tyrolean knights who had settled in Upper Swabia. He was the youngest of nine sons and thus had no chance of inheriting the paternal dominion. Even as an infant, he was prepared for a warrior's career. He grew up at the castle in Mindelheim, which his father had bought from Georg's maternal uncle Ber (Bero) II of Rechberg.

== Career ==
In 1492, he followed his father in the campaign of the Hohenzollern margrave Frederick I of Brandenburg-Ansbach, authorized to execute the Imperial ban against Duke Albert IV of Bavaria. As Albert gave in, the expedition was cancelled. Frundsberg fought for the Habsburg emperor Maximilian I against the Swiss Confederacy in the Swabian War of 1499, where he had to realize that the era of the heavy armoured knights was well and truly over. In the same year he was among the Imperial troops sent to the aid of Ludovico Sforza, who had been deposed as Duke of Milan by King Louis XII of France. When Maximilian appointed him Tyrolean military captain, he recruited a powerful army of pike square infantry formations following the Swiss example.

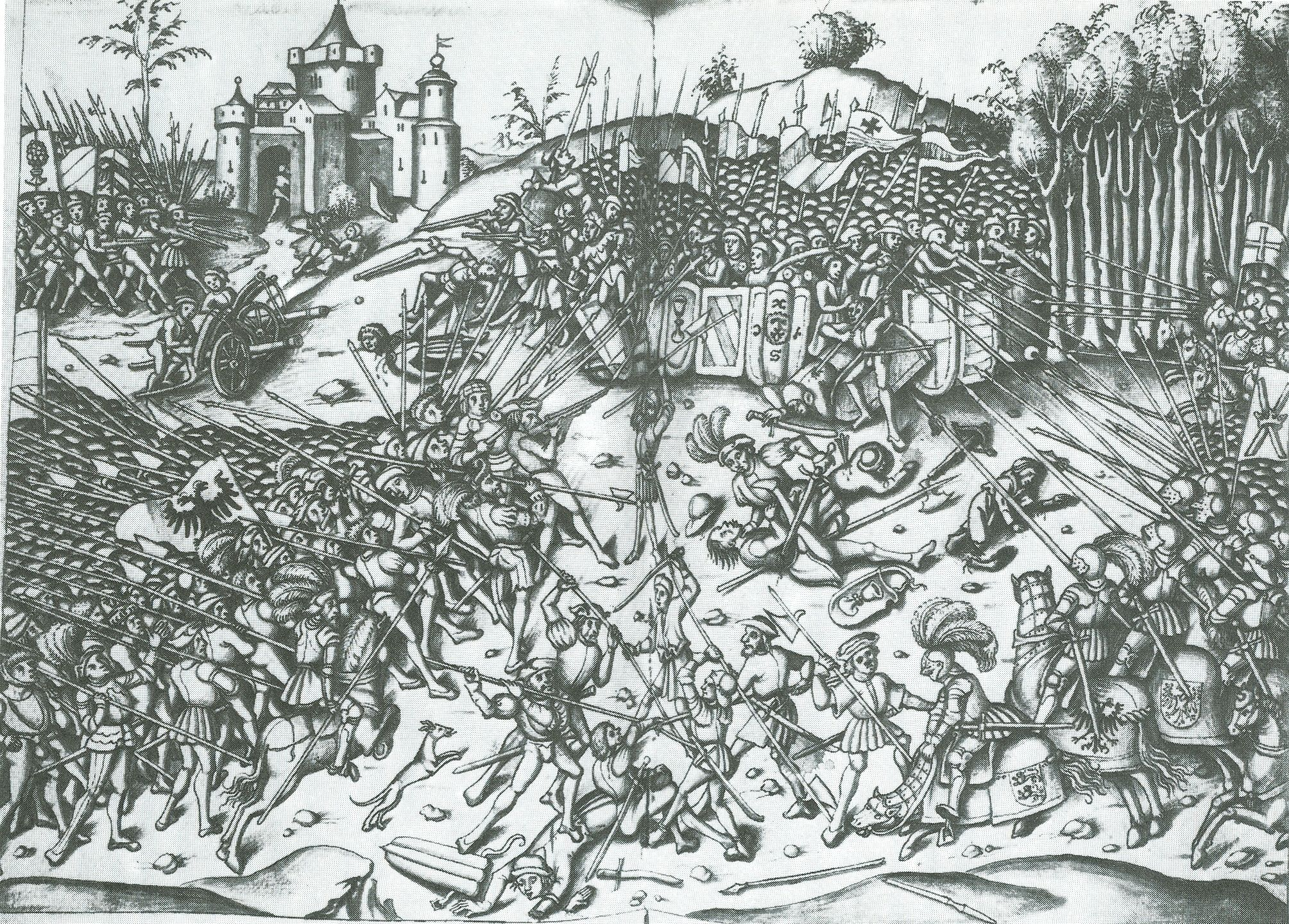
The Battle of Wenzenbach between the troops of Maximilian I and the Czech Utraquists in 1504

Still serving Maximilian, he took part in the 1504 War of the Succession of Landshut, fighting against Count Ruprecht of the Palatinate and his father Elector Palatine Philip. Frundsberg distinguished himself leading a Landsknecht regiment into the decisive Battle of Wenzenbach, whereafter Maximilian I personally bestowed knighthood on him: armed with muskets and culverines, the Frundsberg regiment broke a breach into the wagon-wall of the Bohemian mercenaries (composed 300+ wagons), which were then routed. Convinced of the necessity of a native body of trained infantry, Frundsberg assisted Maximilian in the organization of the Landsknecht troops. One year later, he became the commander of the Landsknechts in the Habsburg Netherlands.

Thereafter, Frundsberg lived an uninterrupted life of war, campaigning for the Empire and the Habsburgs. In 1509, he was appointed "Highest Field Captain" of the Landsknecht Regiment (occupation force) and participated in the War of the League of Cambrai against the Republic of Venice, achieving a reputation for himself and his men when defending Verona against many attacks. In 1512 he was, together with Jakob von Ems, leading the Imperial contingent sent to aid Gaston de Foix to retake Brescia.

After a short visit to Germany, he returned to the Italian peninsula, where he gained fresh laurels by his enterprises against the Venetians and the French. He was heading the Landsknechts at the side of the Spanish commander Fernando d'Avalos at the 1513 Battle of La Motta, routing the vastly outnumbering Venetian troops according to Frundsberg's motto Viel Feind', viel Ehr' ("Many foes, much honor"). Peace being made, he returned to Germany, and at the head of the infantry of the Swabian League assisted in driving Ulrich, Duke of Württemberg, from his duchy in 1519.

At the Diet of Worms in 1521, he allegedly spoke words of encouragement to the "little monk" Martin Luther, and during the Italian War of 1521–26, Frundsberg helped lead the Imperial Army into Picardy. When King Francis I of France appeared on the battlefield with a force of approximately 40,000 men, the clever withdrawal of Emperor Charles V's army saved its existence. Frundsberg considered the withdrawal on Valenciennes as "the greatest luck and most appropriate measure during war."

After the French campaign in 1522 ended and Frundsberg resigned from the leadership of the Landsknechts, he returned to lead the march of 6,000 men on upper Italy. A difficult alpine crossing through deep snow led to the Battle of Bicocca near Milan in April. Swiss nationals on foot fought alongside Frundsberg, who led and fought from the front. The emperor's victory at Bicocca allowed the return of the previous rulers of the oligarchic Republic of Genoa and the Duchy of Milan and brought the greater part of Lombardy under the influence of Charles V.

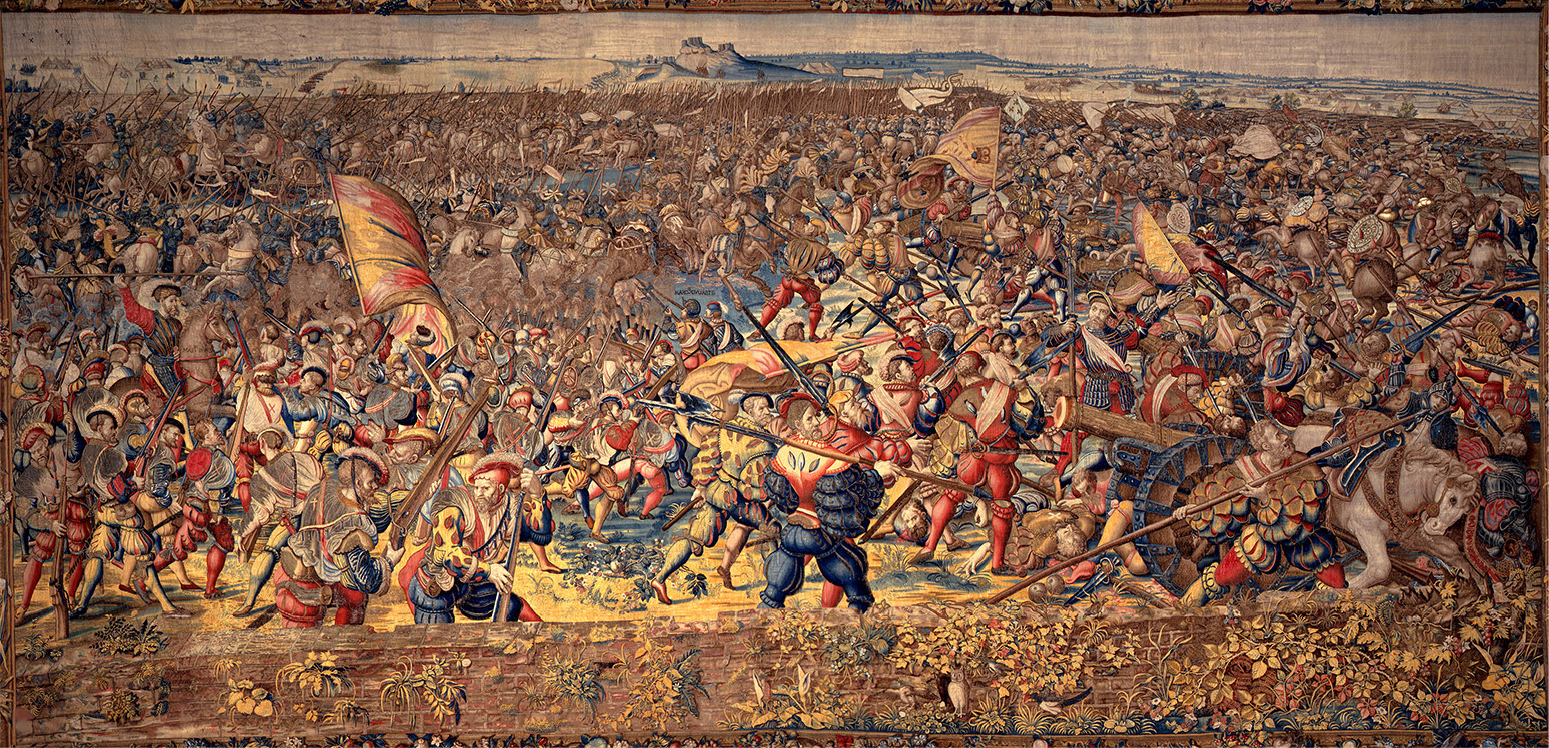
Landsknecht mercenaries (Tapestries of the Battle of Pavia by Bernard van Orley, between 1528 and 1531)

In 1525, after a brief stop in Mindelheim as the "Highest Field Captain" of the entire German Nation (with a force consisting of 12,000 men and twenty-nine flag bearers), Frundsberg moved again towards upper Italy to relieve Pavia and to save the Empire's Duchy of Milan. Despite an additional 6,000 men, of whom some were Spanish, in battle against an enemy that was strongest, Frundsberg won his most famous victory at Pavia, with the capture of the French king.

Only one year later, when the war in Italy was renewed in 1526, Frundsberg received a call for help from the Emperor's Army in Lombardy, to help decide the war. Albeit an insufficient amount, he obtained 36,000 German Thaler to organize the new army. During his occupation of Mindelheim, Frundsberg borrowed money and sold off his silver table settings and his wife's jewelry, in order to acquire the remaining funds to raise the army. In less than three weeks, Frundsberg organized over 12,000 men and crossed the Alps during the middle of November. He joined the Constable de Bourbon near Piacenza and marched towards Rome. However, order and discipline broke down near Modena on 13 March 1527, when no decisive battle developed after months of campaigning in Italy. Payment for the mercenaries remained overdue and, in the end, even Frundsberg was unable to rally the Landsknechts and restore order. The matter shook the old commander to such an extent that he suffered a stroke. Unable to regain his physical strength, Frundsberg was moved to Germany after a long struggle in Italian hospitals. Tormented by great anxiety over the situation with his mercenaries or "beloved sons", the loss of his personal estate and death of one of his sons, Frundsberg died in his castle in Mindelheim.

Though there is no evidence that he ever left the Catholic Church, and in spite of his constant loyalty to the Catholic Emperor, Frundsberg was quite receptive to the message of Martin Luther and according to some stories, before the campaign of 1527, he gathered soldiers willing to pillage and hang a pope.

== Legacy ==
Frundsberg was considered a capable and chivalrous soldier, and a devoted servant of the Habsburgs. A son had been killed in Italy in 1524 just before the battle of Pavia. Another son Caspar (1500–1536) and his grandson Georg (died 1586) were both soldiers of some distinction. With the latter's death, the family became extinct.

The title "Father of the Landsknechte" was used by his contemporaries to refer to Frundsberg, describing both his authority and his devotion to the interests of his soldiers.

== Cultural depictions ==
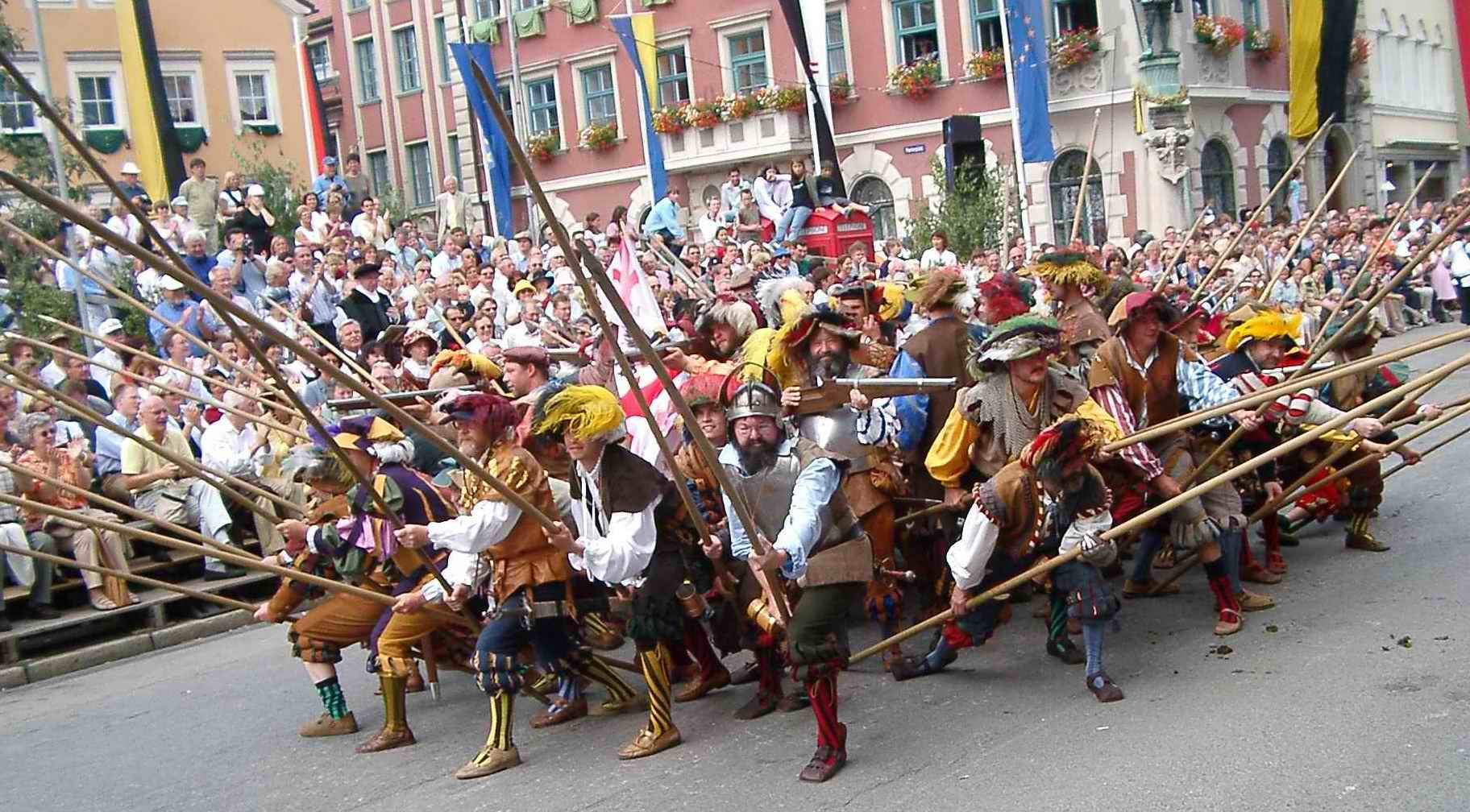
The Mindelheim Frundsbergfest.

There are many anecdotes and stories about the life of Frundsberg, forming a body of legends about him (Mythos Frundsberg). An early contributor to this Mythos was the first biographer of the captain – the writer and mystic Adam Reißner, who was for a time Frundsberg's secretary and as such, witness to many of the events he described. Reinhard Baummann opines that Reißner did glorify Frundsberg, but he also described many realistic events that could have been covered or glossed over by another writer. Another early direct source about Frundsberg was the poet Oswald Fragenstainer – who was not only a scribe but also a soldier under Frundsberg.

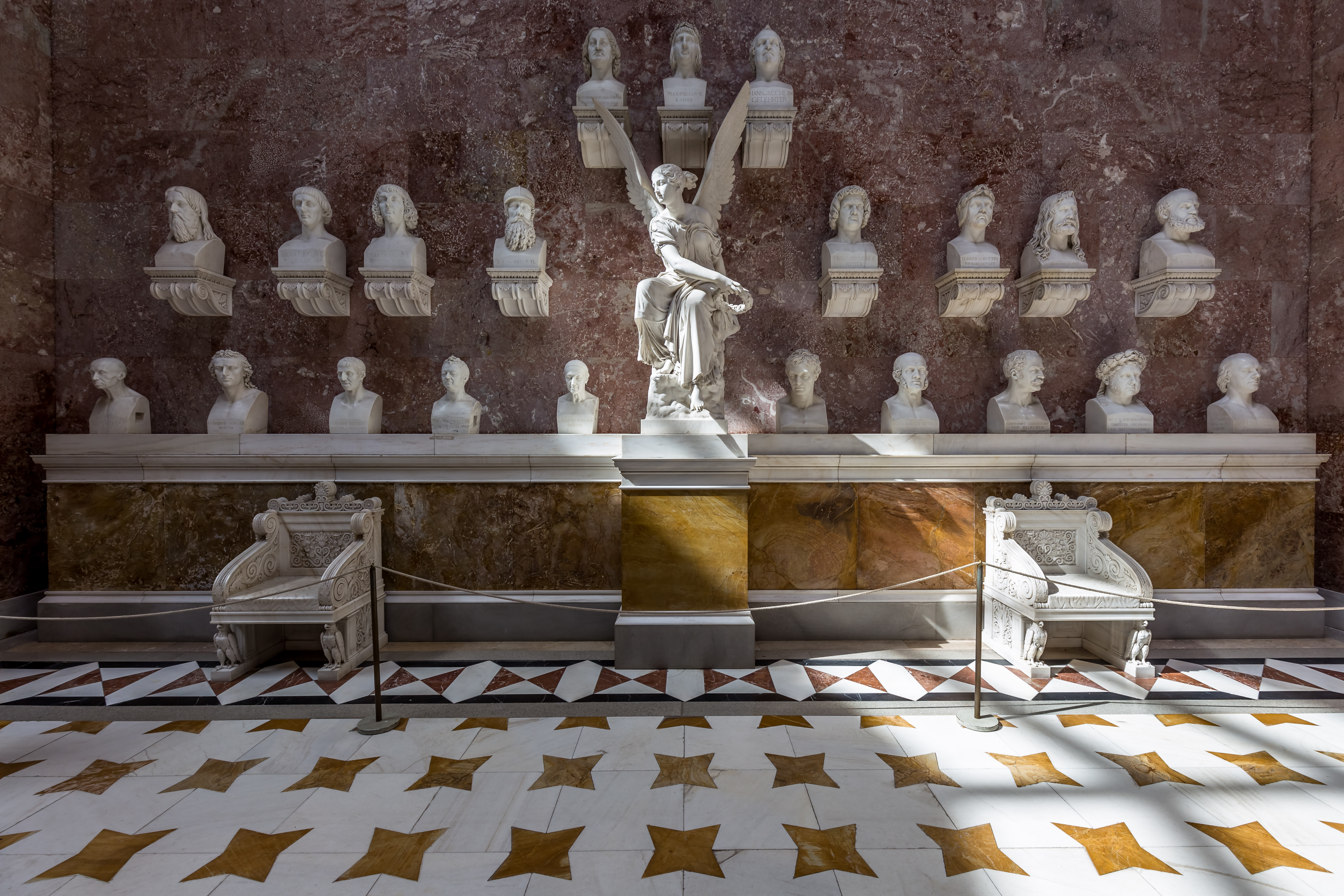
Walhalla: The upper and middle rows contain the busts of Frundsberg and his contemporaries. Upper row: Berthold von Henneberg, Maximilian I, Johannes von Reuchlin. Middle row (left wing): Duke Eberhard I of Württemberg, Hans Memling, Johann von Dalberg, Hans von Hallwyl. Middle row (right wing): Franz von Sickingen, Ulrich von Hutten, Albrecht Dürer, Georg von Frundsberg.

- The Frundsbergfest (Frundsberg Festival) in Mindelheim, one of the largest historical festivals in Germany, is dedicated to Georg von Frundsberg.
- Georg von Frundsberg is a character in the historical novel The Adventurer, AKA Michael The Finn (Mikael Karvajalka) by Mika Waltari.
- In 1841 a bust by Max von Widnmann was added to the Walhalla memorial.
- Emperor Franz Joseph I of Austria had a statue erected in his honour at the Hall of Generals (Feldherrenhalle) of the Vienna Museum of Military History, inaugurated in 1866.
- The Austro-Hungarian corvette SMS Frundsberg launched in 1873 was named after him.
- During World War II, the Waffen-SS 10th Panzer Division by order of 3 October 1943 was given the honorific title Frundsberg.

== Bibliography and further reading ==
- Baumann, Reinhard (2019). Mythos Frundsberg: Familie, Weggefährten, Gegner des Vaters der Landsknechte (1. Auflage ed.). Mindelheim: Verlag Hans Högel KG. ISBN 9783947423156.
- Wilson, Peter H. (2023). Iron and blood: a military history of the German-speaking peoples since 1500. Cambridge, Massachusetts: The Belknap Press of Harvard University Press. ISBN 9780674987623.*
- 10. SS-Pz.Div. "Frundsberg", Abt.VI/Az.37g/Lt./Dr; Div.St.Qu., dtd 6.11.43, National Archives, Record Group 242, Berlin Document Center, Microfilm Publication T354, Roll 150, Frames 791940-791948
