= Arnold zum Turm =

Arnold zum Turm (de turri or of the tower, died c. 1266) was city chancellor to the bishop of Mainz from 1238 until at least 15 October 1263 – his son Eberhard took over that office in 1266 and so Arnold is believed to have died that year.

He is also notable as the co-founder (with Arnold Walpold) of the Rhine City League and as such is commemorated in the Walhalla temple.

== Sources ==
- Walhalla, Amtlicher Führer (Official guidebook), 2006
