= Battle of Morat =

Swiss victory in the Burgundian Wars, 22 June 1476

- Part of the Burgundian Wars
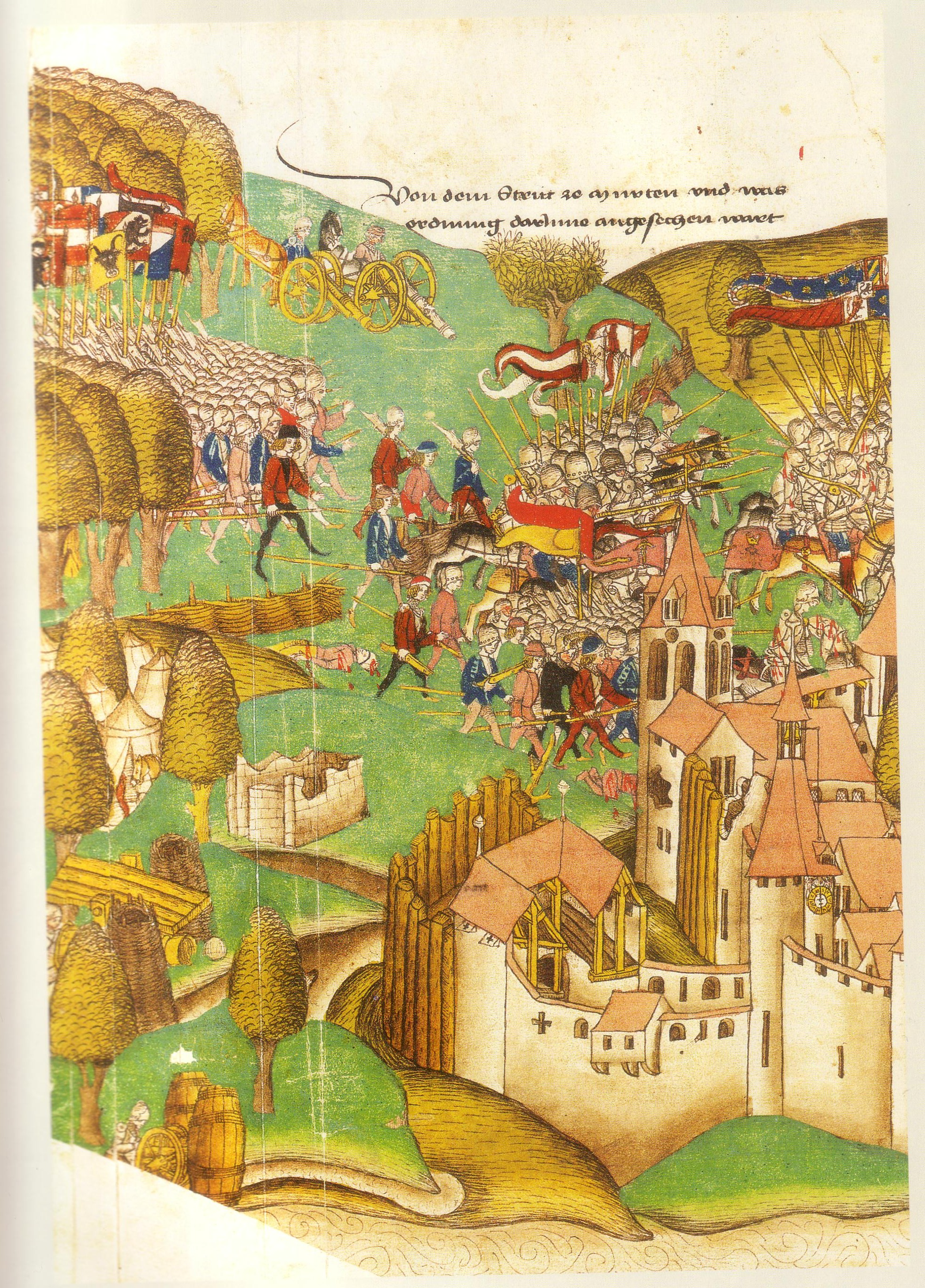
- Illustration from the Zürcher Schilling (1480/1484)
Date	22 June 1476
Location	Near Murten, Canton of Fribourg 46°56′00″N 7°07′00″E
Result	Swiss victory

Belligerents
Duchy of Burgundy; Duchy of Savoy	Old Swiss Confederacy; Duchy of Lorraine; Upper Alsace

Commanders and leaders
Charles the Bold; Jacques of Savoy; John of Luxembourg †	Hans von Hallwyl; Hans Waldmann; Adrian von Bubenberg; René II, Duke of Lorraine

Strength
c. 12,000–c. 20,000	c. 25,000

Casualties and losses
6,000–10,000	410
- Location within Switzerland

The Battle of Morat ((French: Bataille de Morat; German: Schlacht bei Murten) took place during the Burgundian Wars (1474–1477) that was fought on 22 June 1476 between Charles the Bold, the Duke of Burgundy, and a Swiss Confederation army at Morat (Murten), about 30 kilometres from Bern. It was the second major engagement of the Burgundian Wars, and ended in a crippling defeat for Charles the Bold. The severity of the losses permanently crippled the Burgundian army and their military efforts.

== Background ==
The Burgundian Wars (1474–1477) were a product of the expansionist ambitions of Charles the Bold, who had been crowned Duke of Burgundy in 1467.

== See also ==
- Battles of the Old Swiss Confederacy
