= Hans von Hallwyl =

Hans von Hallwyl (c. 1433/1434 – 19 March 1504) was a Swiss army commander, known for leading the vanguard in the Old Swiss Confederacy's victory at the Battle of Morat on 22 June 1476.

== Life ==
Hallwyl was part of the swiss nobel family Hallwyl that lived in the Hallwyl Castle. In 1475 he married Magdalena von Rothenstein of the Rothenstein noble family. He fought in the Burgundian Wars and was one of the commanders at the Battle of Grandson on 2 March 1476, before which he was knighted. In the same year he led the vanguard at the Battle of Morat. Later Hallwyl was also in the service of Louis XI.
