= Hanke Brothers =

German chamber music ensemble

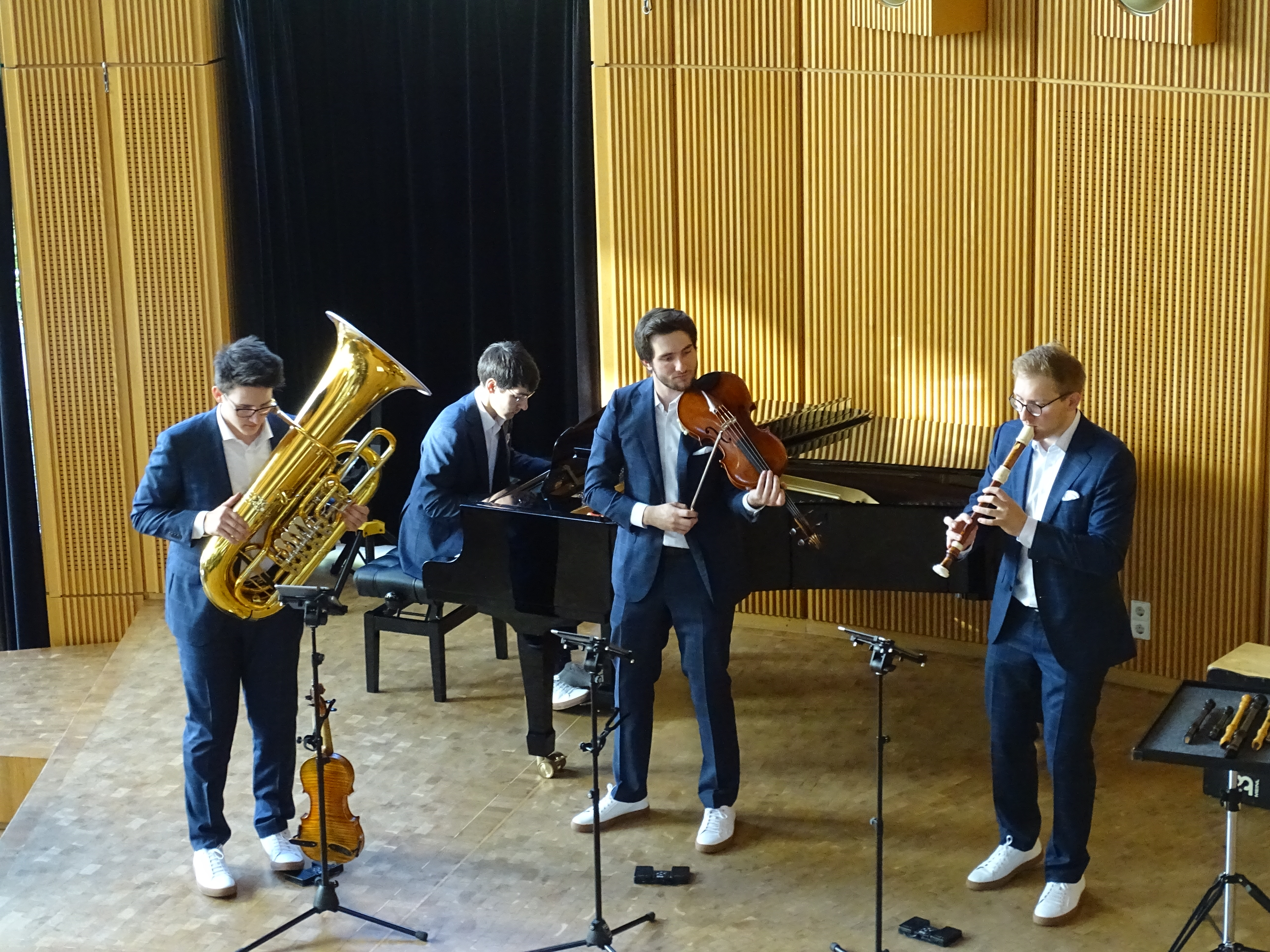
SMTT Sindelfingen, October 2018

Founded in 2017, the Hanke Brothers is a chamber music ensemble, which moves between the music genres minimal music, Neue Musik, classical and pop music.

The members are four brothers from Sindelfingen: David Hanke (recorder), Lukas Hanke (viola, percussion), Jonathan Hanke (piano, composition, percussion, melodica) and Fabian Hanke (tuba, violin). They come from a musical family, the father Matthias Hanke is Landeskirchenmusikdirektor, the mother Theresia is a professional violinist.

== Career ==
- 2014: First CD recording of the Hanke family (Matthias, Theresia, David, Lukas, Jonathan and Fabian) together with the cellist and academic teacher Gerhart Darmstadt
- 2015: Biennale Sindelfingen, first appearance as "Hanke & friends"
- 2016: "HANKE IN CONCERT" in der Martinskirche Sindelfingen, premiere "4#David" by Jonathan Hanke for recorder and piano
- 2016: "Pinocchio und der Flötenspieler" world premiere, musical children's fairy tale in a new version for the Hanke family by the Graz composer Viktor Fortin
- 2016: Erste Colourful Concerts (Jubiläumskonzert Stadtkirche Backnang, Gedächtniskirche Stuttgart)
- 2017: Biennale Sindelfingen: Hanke Brothers – Moonlight Serenade (First appearance under the name "Hanke Brothers")
- Summer 2017: 5 concerts in Wittenberg at the World Reformation Exhibition.
- September 2017: Premiere of THE BIG BROJECT, Stadthalle Sindelfingen, with world premieres by Aleksey Igudesman, Juri de Marco, Stephan Boehme and Jonathan Hanke
- January 2018: Theaterhaus Stuttgart
- January 2019: Release of the first CD "Elements" on the label H-Factory Records with compositions by Aleksey Igudesman, Oliver Davis, Juri de Marco, Stephan Boehme, Roland Szentpali and Jonathan Hanke.
- Further performances in 2019: Festival Europäische Kirchenmusik Schwäbisch Gmünd, Ludwigsburger Schlossfestspiele, Konzerthaus Dortmund (as part of the German Protestant Kirchentag), u.v.m.
- 2020: 70th anniversary Sozialverband VdK Deutschland Deutschland Berlin, Premiere "Heimspiel 2020", Weihnachtsliederstreamen among others the Stuttgarter Kickers together with Patrick Bopp from the Füenf.

Other special performances by the Hanke Brothers took place at galas such as "10 Years of the MSOE Grohmann Museum Milwaukee" and the Vienna Red Cross Ball.

Aleksey Igudesman has composed the full-length work Seven Continents exclusively for the Hanke Brothers. Here he tries to convey each continent, above all, emotionally.

In the meantime, over 30 original compositions have been composed for the Hanke Brothers, including Stephan Boehme, Oliver Davis, Jonathan Hanke, Jan-Benjamin Homolka, Aleksey Igudesman, Nicolas Kok, Christoph Reuter and Sören Sieg.

== Recordings ==
- Familie Hanke Von Barock bis Sakro-Pop, 2014.
- Hanke Brothers: Elements, bei H-Factory Records, 2019.
- Arcadia: Oliver Davis, Signum Classics, 2019.
