= Matthias Hanke =

German regional director of Protestant church music

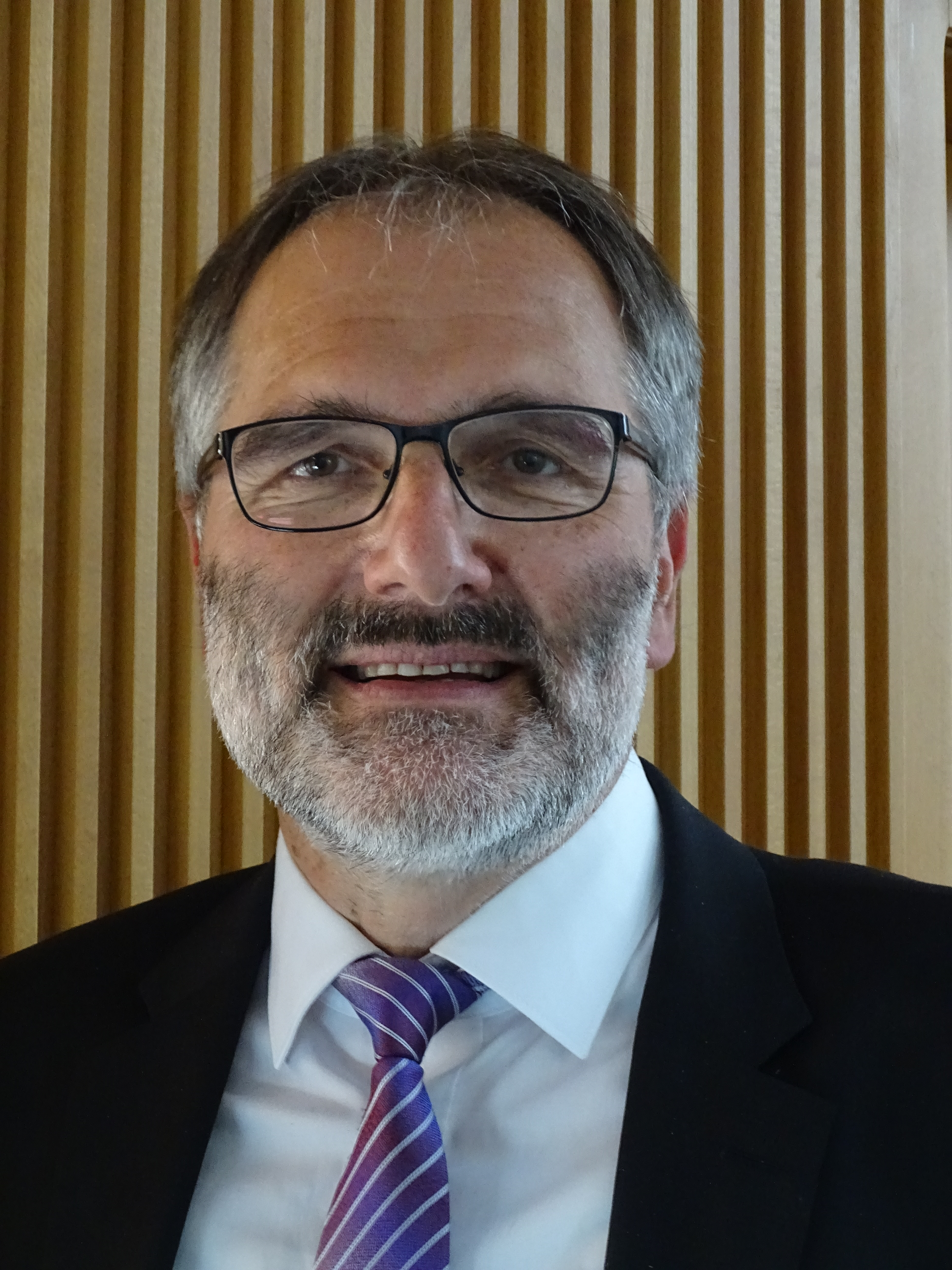
- Matthias Hanke in 2018
- Born: 1965 (age 59–60); Kelheim, Bavaria, Germany
- Occupations: Organist; Church musician; Landeskirchenmusikdirektor
- Organizations: St. Martin, Sindelfingen; Evangelische Landeskirche in Württemberg

Matthias Hanke (born 1965) is a German organist and church musician. He is a regional head of church music of the Protestant church in Württemberg as Landeskirchenmusikdirektor of the Evangelische Landeskirche in Württemberg. Previously he was responsible for the church district of Böblingen and Kirchenmusikdirektor in Sindelfingen. His church choirs and orchestra have toured internationally, and made recordings.

== Career ==
Hanke was born in Kelheim, Bavaria. He directed a church choir and a trombone choir from age 14, and served as organist at three churches. He passed the D and C exams for organists before graduating from high school. He studied music pedagogy and church music in Bayreuth and Munich, graduating with the A exam. He became director of the music education at the Bavarian State School for the Blind in Munich.

In 1995, Hanke moved to the position of church musician at St. Martin in Sindelfingen. In 2003, he was appointed Kirchenmusikdirektor by the regional bishop Gerhard Maier, then as the youngest in the history of the regional church. He was also Bezirkskantor in the Böblingen church district. Hanke has conducted several choirs and the Stiftshoforchester in Sindelfingen, and toured with some internationally, including to Brazil, France, Italy, Poland, Russia, South Africa and Spain. He founded the Sindelfinger Bachtage festival and a project "Raum geben – die leere Martinskirche" (Give space – the empty church St. Martin), with interdisciplinary concert and service formats.

On 1 April 2016, Hanke was appointed Landeskirchenmusikdirektor (LKMD) of the Evangelische Landeskirche in Württemberg, succeeding Bernhard Reich, responsible for all Protestant church music in Württemberg. He has been chairman of the advisory board of the Singing with Children Foundation since 2018, and chairman of the advisory board of Kohelet, a company that released a free hymn application, Cantico, in 2019.

Hanke is married to Theresia Hanke, an Austrian violinist. Their four sons are also active musicians, performing as a band, the Hanke Brothers.

== Publications ==
=== Music collections and articles ===
- Grenzenlos – Boundless – Kirchenlieder in verschiedenen Sprachen, published by Referat Mission, Ökumene und kirchlicher Entwicklungsdienst, with Amt für Kirchenmusik der Evangelischen Landeskirche in Württemberg, Strube-Verlag (VS4141), Stuttgart 2020.
- Chorheft 1993 zum Kirchentag in München, edited by Helga Draugelates, Lothar Friedrich and Matthias Hanke, Strube-Verlag (edition 1323), Munich 1993
- Chor im Gottesdienst and other essays, in Musik in unserer Kirche. Handbuch der Kirchenmusik in der Evangelischen Landeskirche in Württemberg, Strube-Verlag (Edition 9058), Munich 2007, ISBN 978-3-89912-102-5.
- Das Liederbuch für den Gottesdienst, edited by Hans-Joachim Eißler, Michael Krimmer and Cornelius Kuttler with the collaboration of Matthias Hanke and Bernhard Leube, book+music, Stuttgart 2019, ISBN 978-3-86687-247-9.
- Wo wir dich loben, wachsen neue Lieder – Ein Angebot für die Gemeinden, published by the Evangelische Landeskirchen in Baden, Württemberg, Pfalz, Elsass und Lothringen, Strube-Verlag Munich 2005, VS 6282, ISBN 3-89912-083-3.
- Wo wir dich loben, wachsen neue Lieder – plus, published by the Evangelische Landeskirchen in Baden, Württemberg, Pfalz, Elsass und Lothringen, Strube-Verlag Munich 2018, VS 4111, ISBN 978-3-89912-211-4.

=== Recordings ===
- Let Praises Sound, Vespers service by Niels Kjellström, with the Sindelfinger Kinder- und Jugendchor (Sindelfingen children's and youth choir), cappella nuova Sindelfingen, bigband and Latino combo, Anja Tschamler (vocals), conducted by Matthias Hanke, Sindelfingen 2010.
- Missa Pacis, DVD and CD of the jazz mass of the same name by and with Tilman Jäger, Munich 2016, Carus Verlag Stuttgart CV 28.005/99
