= Kupke =

Kupke is a German surname of Slavic origin, a phonetic variation of Kupka. Notable persons with that name include:

- Joachim Kupke (born 1947), German painter and graphic artist
- Ronny Kupke (born 1977), German politician
