= Christoph Reuter (pianist) =

German pianist

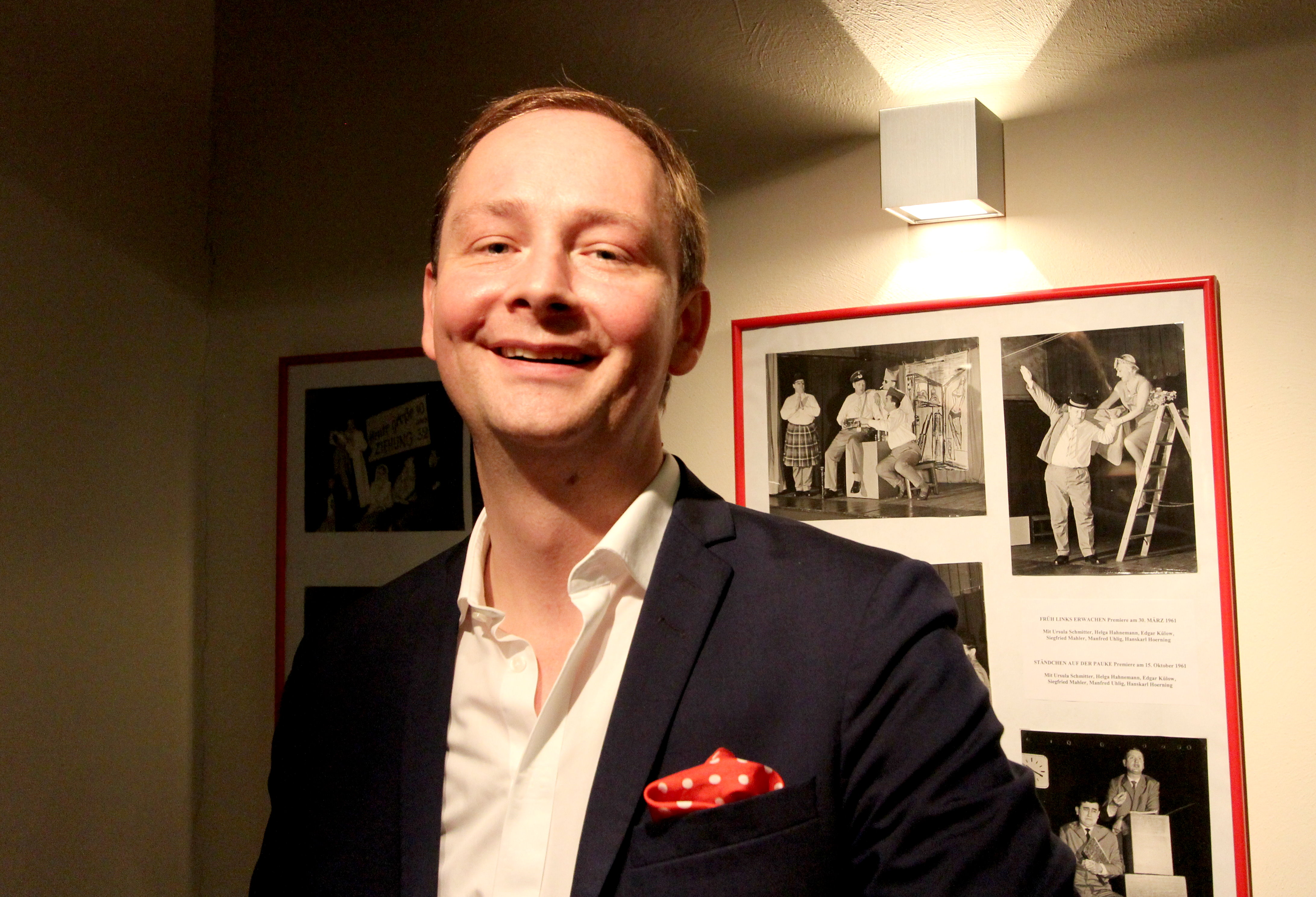
Christoph Reuter, Leipzig 2018

Christoph Reuter (born 1977) is a German jazz pianist, composer and music educator.

== Life ==
Born in Dessau, Reuter studied jazz piano and music education at the Hochschule für Musik Hanns Eisler Berlin and the University of Music and Theatre Leipzig. He passed his concert exam with Richie Beirach. Since 2007, he has premiered three piano concertos. For the Impulse Festival für Neue Musik in Sachsen-Anhalt entstanden die Auftragswerke Die Himmelsscheibe und Teufelsspiegel. In 2010, he and singer Cristin Claas wrote the music for the children's opera Oskar und die Groschenbande. (text: Andreas Hillger), die beim Kurt-Weill-Fest in March 2012 at the Anhaltisches Theater Dessau under the direction of Silke Wallstein. Another premiere took place on 25 February 2013 in Hamburg under the direction of Claudia Cerachowitz. In the same year, the Musical Sarg niemals nie.

Reuter composes for orchestras such as the Anhaltische Philharmonie Dessau, the Staatskapelle Halle, the Deutsches Filmorchester Babelsberg, choirs, bands and writes music for plays. His concert activities as a pianist take him to Germany and abroad. He gives solo concerts, plays in Cristin Claas' trio and in the electro jazz band ye:solar. He has released numerous albums with his diverse band projects. Since 2006, he has made regular guest appearances with cabaret artist Eckart von Hirschhausen.

In 2017, he received the Thüringer Kleinkunstpreis of the city of Meiningen.
