= Bernd Vöhringer =

German politician (born 1968)

Bernd Vöhringer (*October 24, 1968, in Sindelfingen) is a German politician of the Christian Democratic Union (CDU) and the former Lord Mayor of Sindelfingen. When first elected as Lord Mayor of Sindelfingen in 2001, he was the youngest Lord Mayor in Germany at the age of 32.

== Early life and education ==
Bernd Vöhringer grew up in Sindelfingen and graduated from the Hinterweil Secondary School in 1985. He then completed an apprenticeship as an industrial clerk at IBM Germany GmbH from August 1985 to June 1987. After finishing his apprenticeship, Vöhringer obtained his Abitur at the Stuttgart School of Economics and continued working as a freelance employee at IBM. Following his mandatory military service with the staff of the Franco-German Brigade in Böblingen from June 1989 to August 1990, he began studying economics at the University of Hohenheim, where he earned a degree in economics. During his studies, he worked at the German branch of Hewlett-Packard in Böblingen as a marketing assistant and later as a product manager after graduation. He pursued a Ph.D. at the University of Hohenheim, simultaneously working as a research associate until 2000. His doctoral thesis, completed in 2003, is titled Support for Municipal Political Leadership through Information and Communication Technology within the Framework of New Public Management.

== Career ==
After working as a management consultant at Droege & Comp. AG in Munich from 2000 to 2001, Bernd Vöhringer was elected Lord Mayor of Sindelfingen in Baden-Württemberg on May 27, 2001. He was re-elected in 2009 and 2017.

=== Public offices ===
As Lord Mayor, Vöhringer has been involved in various committees and councils at regional, national, and international levels. He is particularly focused on a strong Europe based on shared values and the principle of subsidiarity. Since 2012, he has been an active member of the German delegation in the Congress of Local and Regional Authorities of the Council of Europe, where he served as the head of the delegation until February 2021. From November 2018 to March 2021, he was also the chairman of the European People's Party in the Congress. On March 23, 2021, he was elected President of the Chamber of Local Authorities in the Congress of Local and Regional Authorities.

=== Political career ===
Vöhringer has been a member of the Christian Democratic Union of Germany (CDU) since 1990. He started his career as chairman of the Young Union Sindelfingen, then became chairman of the Union District Association Böblingen, and later the chairman of the CDU Sindelfingen City Association. He was elected to the City Council of Sindelfingen in 1994, where he served until June 2000. From April 1997 to June 2000, he chaired the CDU faction of the City Council. On May 27, 2001, he was elected Lord Mayor of Sindelfingen in the second round of voting. He was re-elected in 2009 and 2017.

Since 2004, Vöhringer has been a member of the District Council in the Böblingen district. He also served as a member of the Regional Assembly of the Stuttgart Region from 1999 to 2019 and has been a member of this assembly again since 2024.

== Voluntary engagement ==
Vöhringer is actively involved in various voluntary activities. For many years, he has been active with the German Red Cross (DRK) Sindelfingen, initially as a simple paramedic, and since 2014 as a certified emergency medical technician. Since 2006, he has also been Vice President of the DRK District Association Böblingen. He is also a member of the VfL Sindelfingen and the Sindelfingen City Youth Association. From 2002 to 2012, he was Chairman of the Sports Region Stuttgart, and he is a member of the Rotary Club Stuttgart-Wildpark.

== Personal life ==
Bernd Vöhringer lives in Sindelfingen and has one son.

== Selected works ==
- Computer-assisted Leadership in Municipal Administration and Politics: Management with New Public Management and Information Technology. With a foreword by Helmut Krcmar. Wiesbaden 2004, ISBN 978-3-8244-8012-8
