= Kupka =

Kupka is a Slavic surname of several possibe origins. Czech-language feminine form: Kupková. Notable people with the surname include:

- František Kupka (1871–1957), Czech painter and graphic artist
- Stephen Kupka (born c. 1946), American baritone saxophone player and composer
- Theofil Kupka (1885–1920), Silesian politician

== See also ==
- 5363 Kupka, main-belt asteroid
- Kupka, Hlyboka Raion, a village in Ukraine
- Kupke
