= St. Martin, Sindelfingen =

Lutheran church in Württemberg, Germany

St. Martin
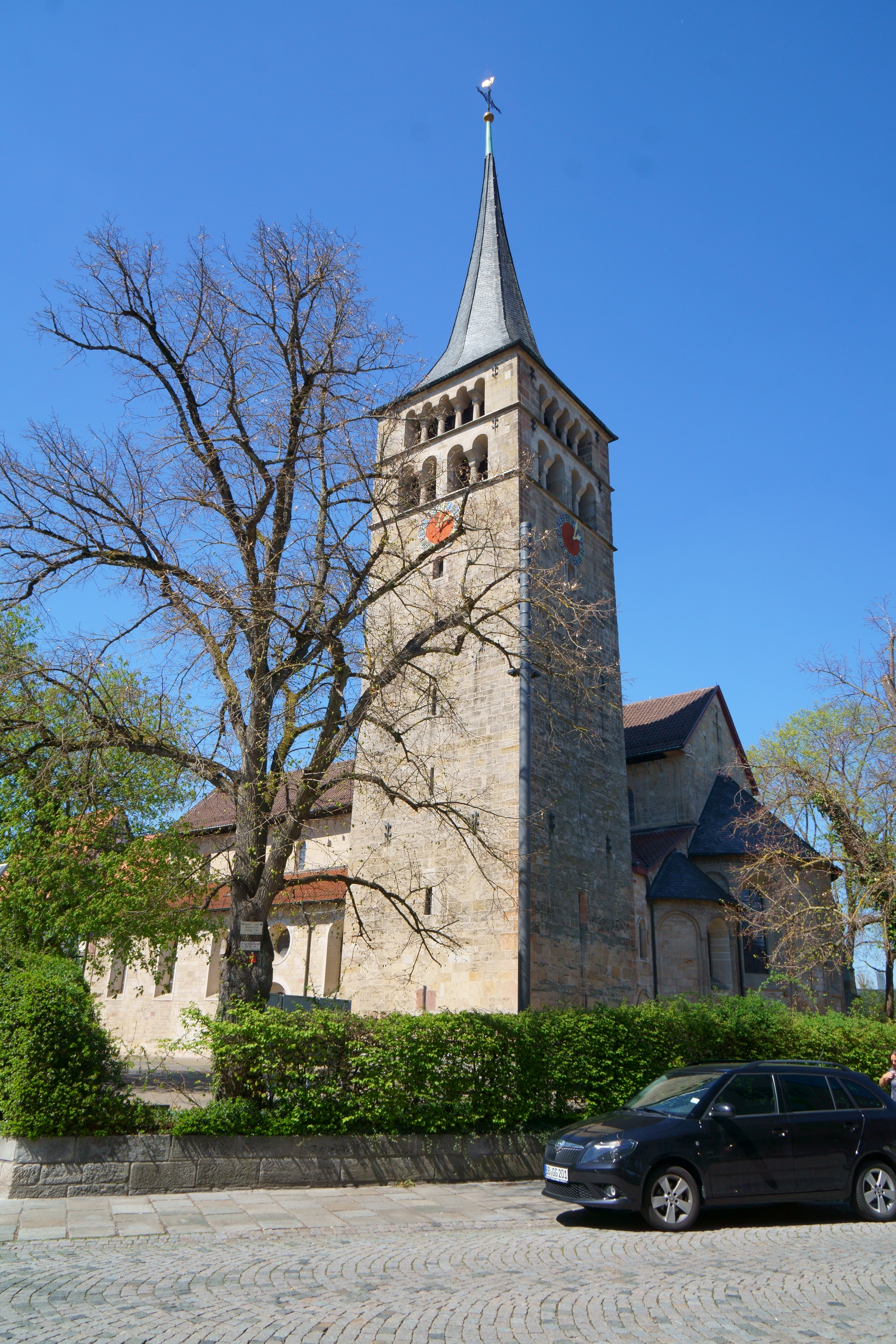
- St. Martin
- 48°42′40″N 9°00′05″E
- Location: Sindelfingen, Baden-Württemberg, Germany
- Denomination: Lutheran
- Website: Official website

History
- Dedication: St. Martin
- Consecrated: 1083

Architecture
- Functional status: active
- Architectural type: Romanesque style basilica
- Years built: 1065—1132

The Martinskirche (St. Martin's church) is the Lutheran main church in Sindelfingen, Baden-Württemberg, Germany. It was built in Romanesque style as a basilica with a flat wooden ceiling, then part of a monastery. Today, the church is also a venue of church music events.

== History ==
The present church was conceived around 1059 to serve as the church of a Benedictine monastery, founded by Adalbert II., Count of Calw. The church was built on the foundations of an earlier church, in Romanesque style as a basilica with a flat wooden ceiling. Construction began in 1080, and the church was consecrated on 4 July 1083 by the Bishop of Würzburg and the Archbishop of Salzburg, dedicated to Martin of Tours. Building was completed in 1132 under Welf VI of Spoleto. The church also served the local parish. The Sindelfingen Abbey was dissolved in 1447.

Sindelfingen had its first Lutheran pastor in 1554, named Martinus.

The church was restored three times: first from 1863 to 1868, directed by Christian Friedrich Leins, second in 1933, supervised by Ernst Robert Fiechter and H. Seytter, and third in 1973/74, led by Martin Stockburger.

== Architecture ==
The church was built as a traditional basilica, with three apses. The original wooden ceiling is preserved, one of the oldest in the state of Baden-Württemberg, with the tree felling dated to 1131. The ceiling was painted with the symbols of the four Evangelists in 1933, designed by Fiechter in a retrospective style. The entrance door features Romanesque door hardware (Beschläge) from the 12th century.

== Organ ==
A pipe organ was first mentioned in 1576. A new organ was built in 1661 by Jakob Müntzer, using five of the stops of the earlier instrument. The organ was expanded and restored in 1687, adding a pedal and two stops.

=== Walcker organs ===
A new organ with two manuals was completed in 1830 by Eberhard Friedrich Walcker from Ludwigsburg. It was installed in the old housing with 19 stops and a pedal of 2 ½ octaves. When the church was remodelled from 1862 to 1864, the old housing was replaced by a simpler one to match the style of the building better.

Demands for a better organ that could also serve concert music led to the foundation of a collection towards a new organ (Orgelfonds) before World War I. It was funded by generous private donations and from the money for the requisition of large organ pipes for the war. Walcker was commissioned to build a Konzertorgel. It was completed in 1920, with two manuals, pedal and 15 stops, and with room for expansion of up to 45 stops.

=== Weigle organ ===
The present main organ of St. Martin was built in 1961 by Orgelbau Friedrich Weigle from Echterdingen, revised in 1974 and 1991. It had 37 stops, three manuals and pedal. In 2016, the Weigle organ was restored by Orgelbau Mühleisen from Leonberg, taking it completely apart for restoration. An electronic control was added, and some stops were replaced.

== Gallery ==
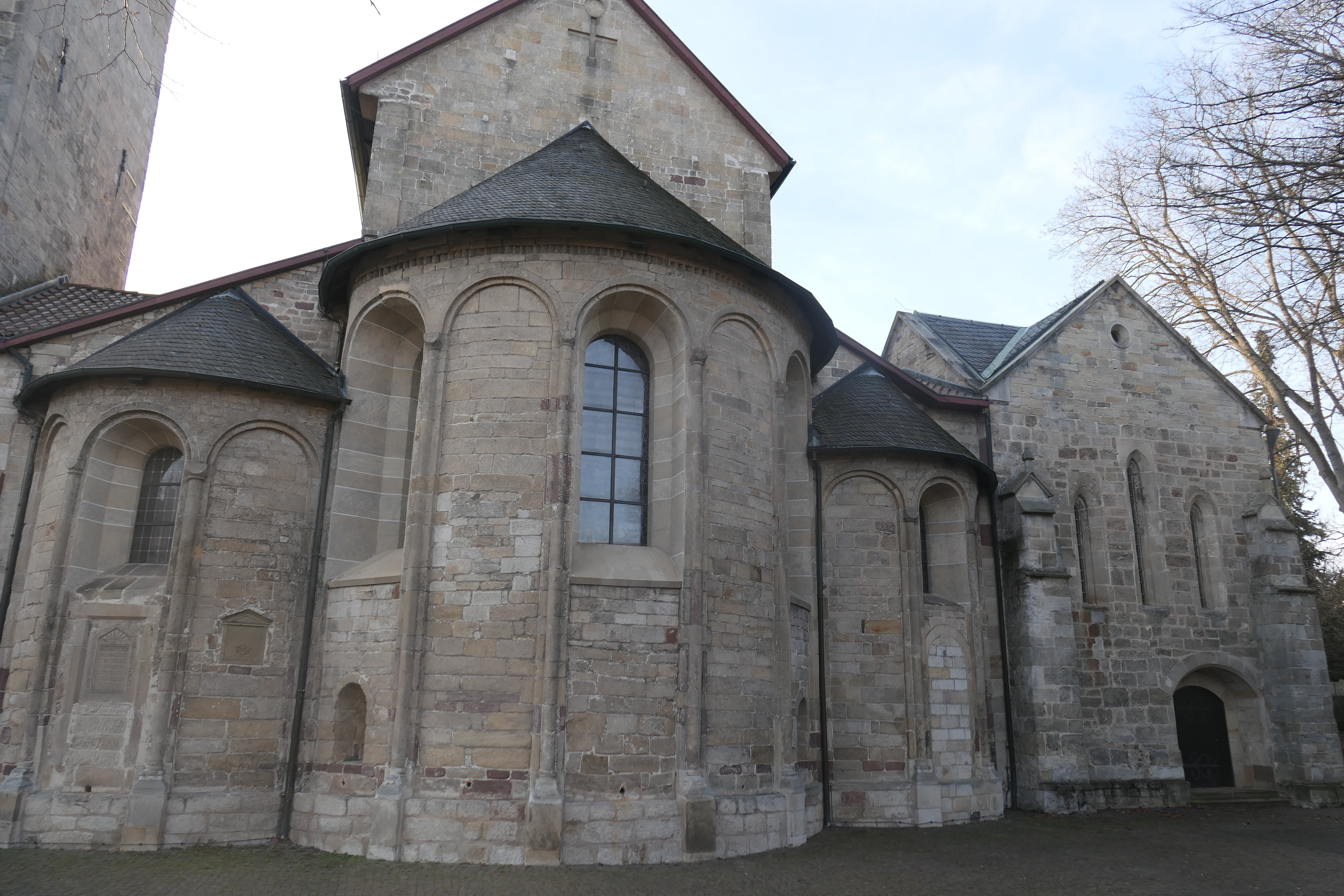
Apses

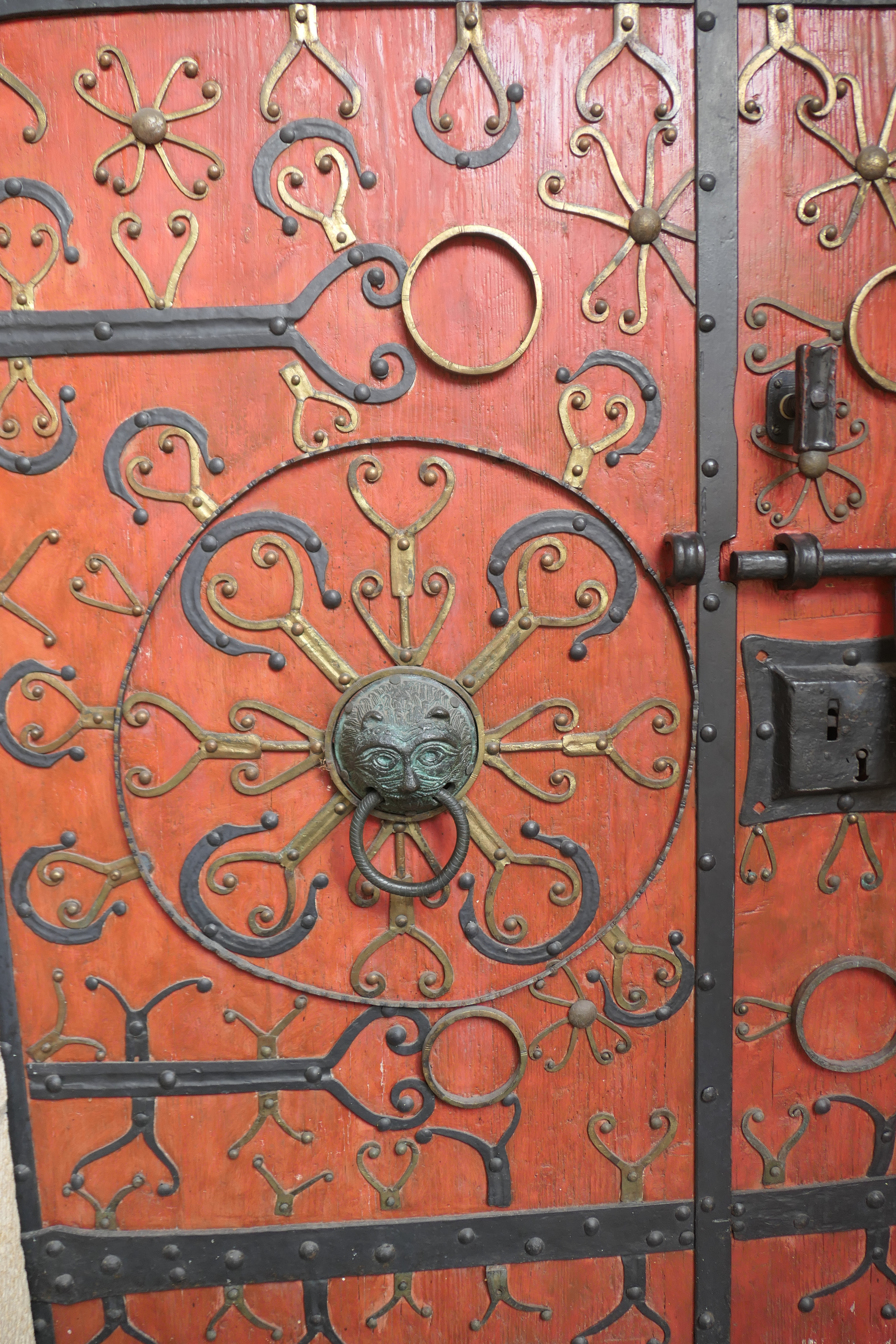
West portal from the 12th century

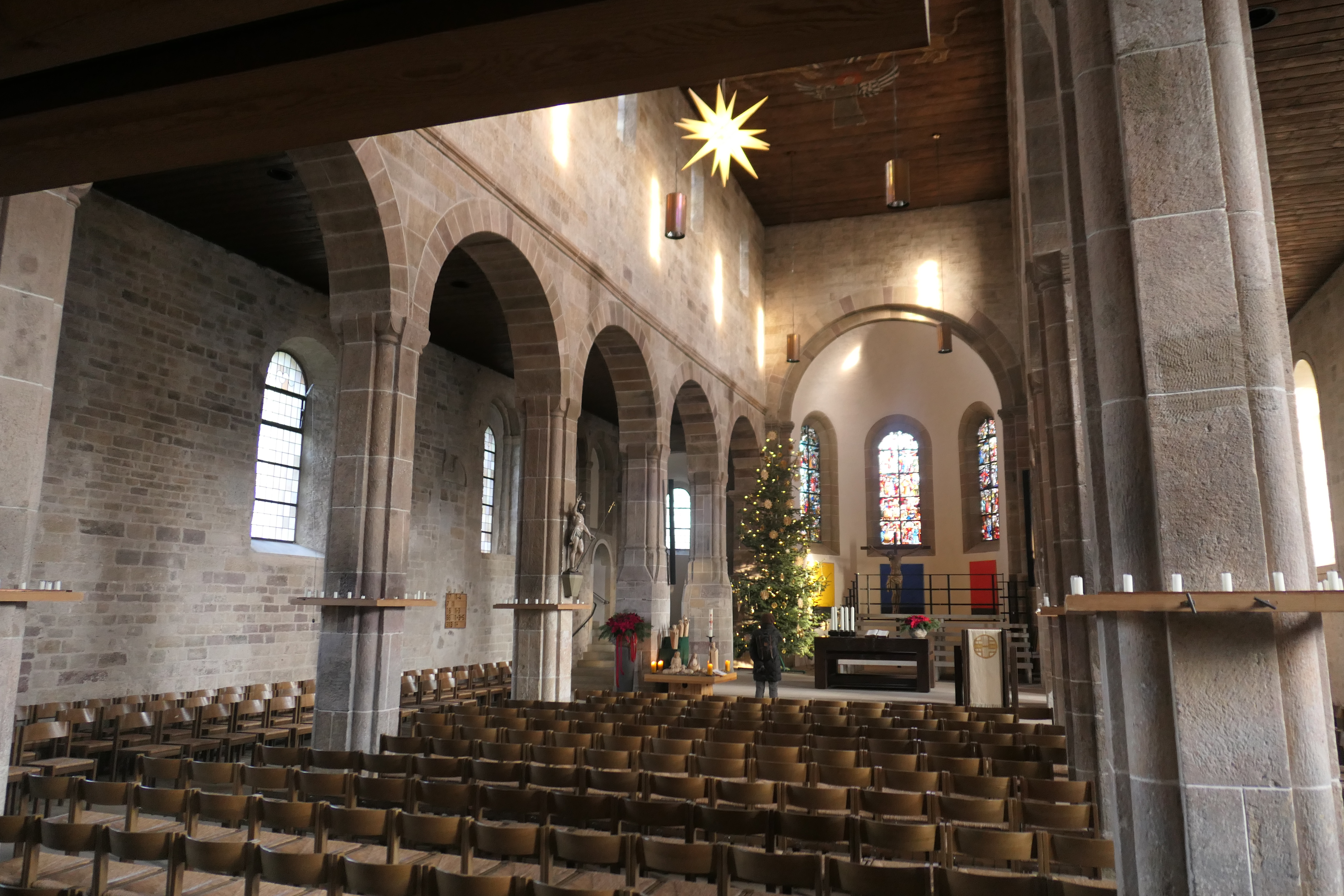
Nave towards the choir

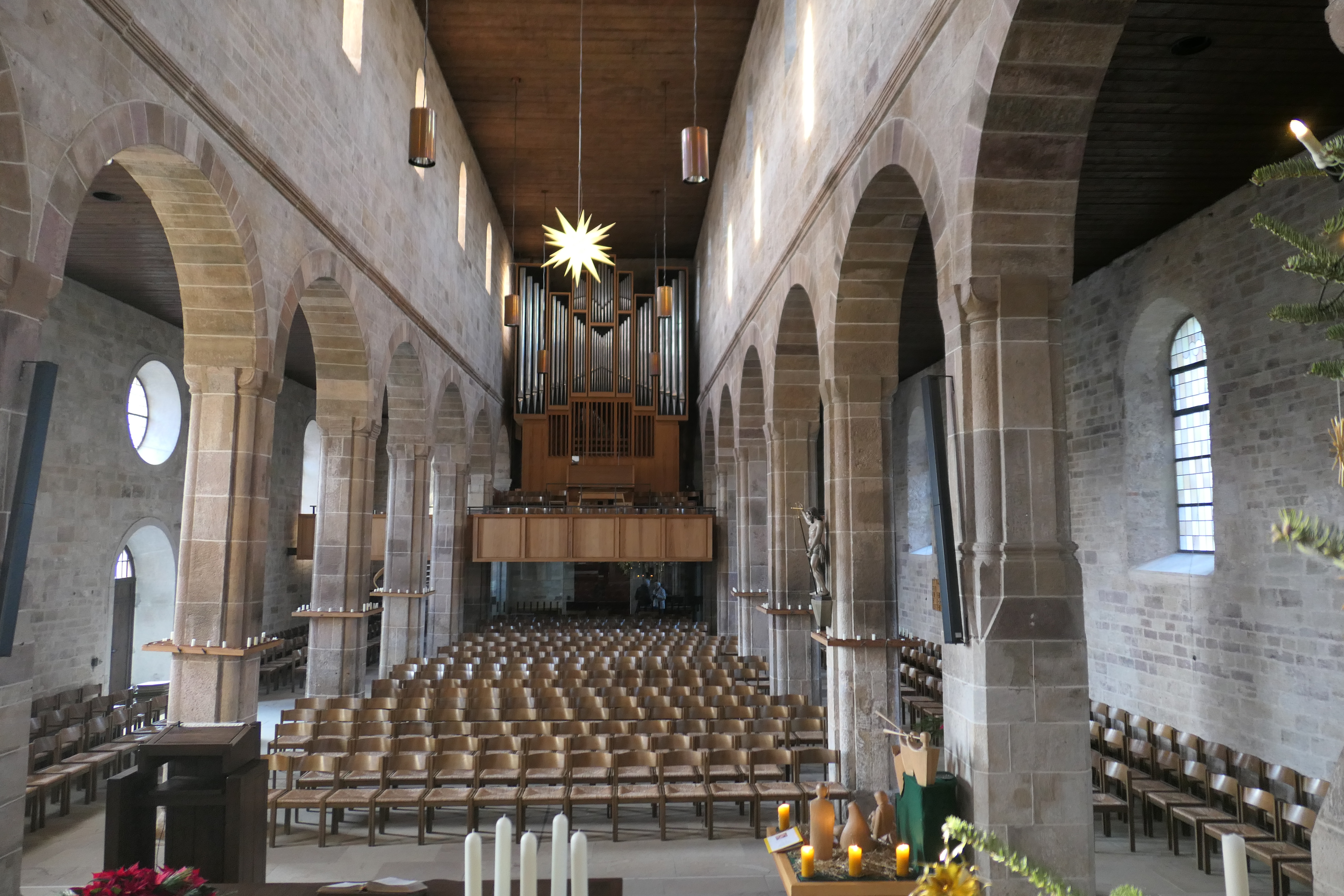
Nave towards the organ

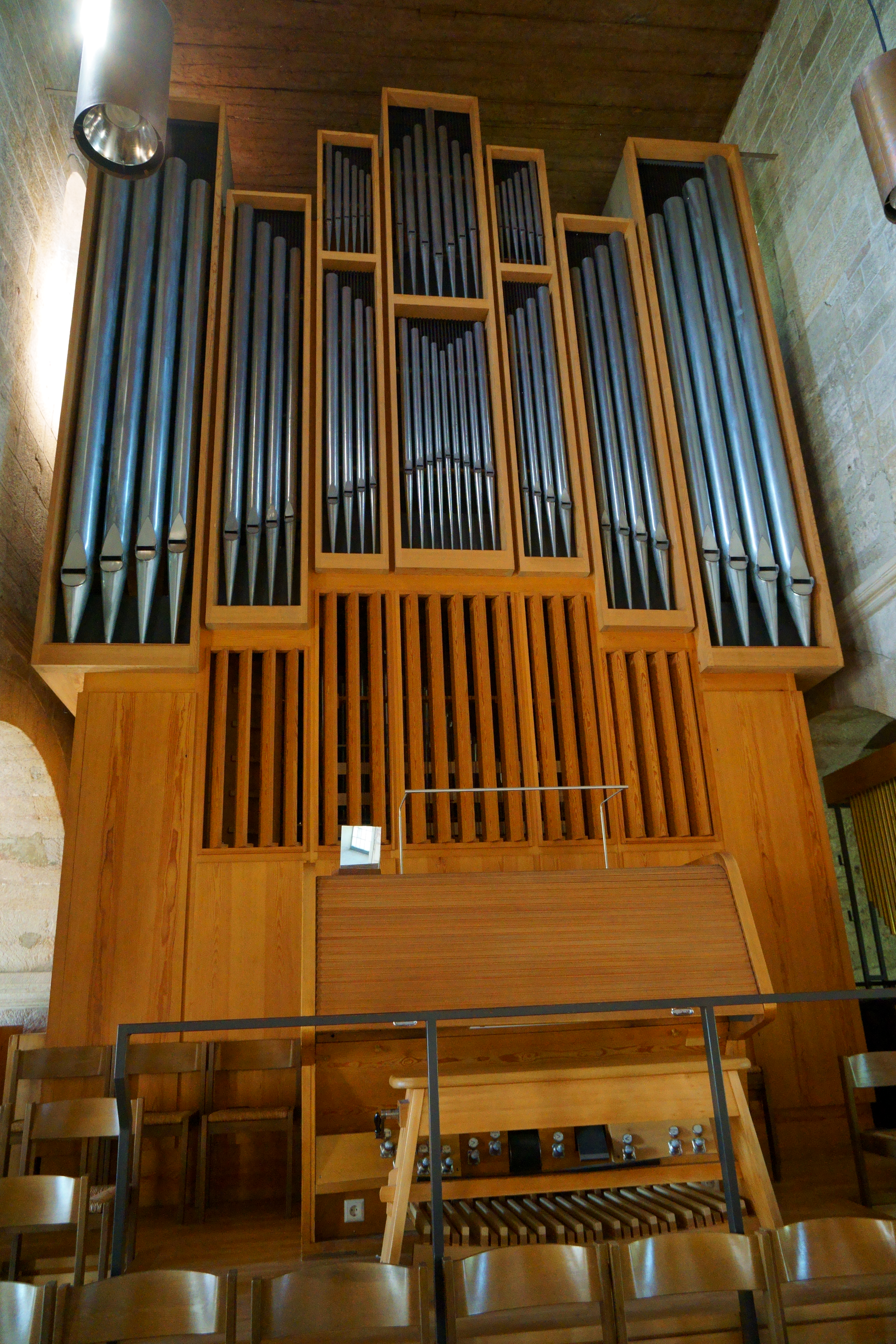
Weigle organ
