= Joachim Kupke =

German painter and graphic artist

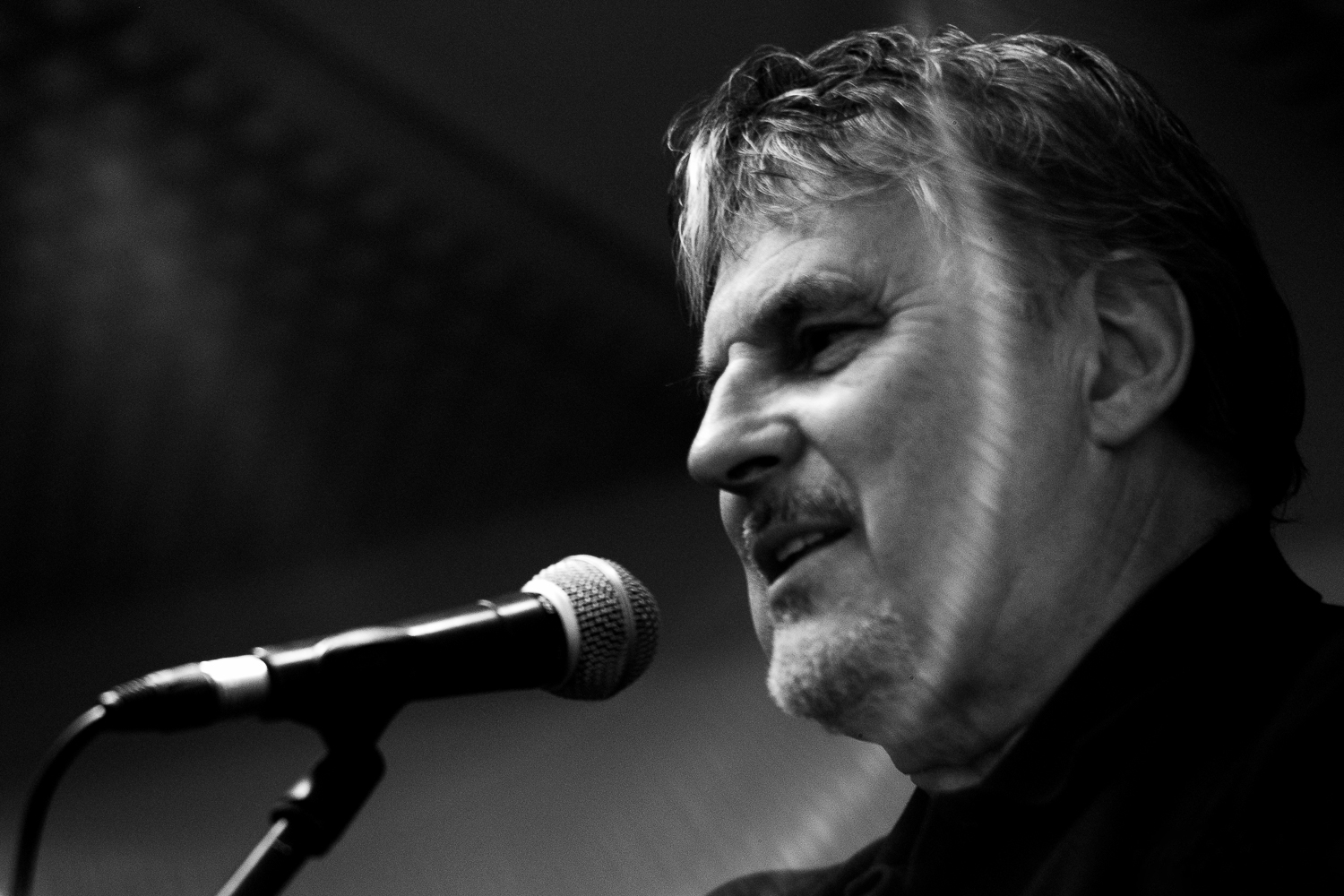
- Joachim Kupke in 2014
- Born: 21 May 1947 (age 79); Sindelfingen
- Occupations: Painter and graphic artist

Joachim Kupke (born 21 May 1947, in Sindelfingen) is a German painter and graphic artist. Since the 1970s, he has also worked as a musician, and singer/ songwriter in the band, "If you wanted to".

== Life and art ==
From 1965 to 1967 Joachim Kupke attended the Art School A.L. Merz in Stuttgart. Following this, he studied at the Academy of Fine Arts in Stuttgart with Rudolf Haegele (1967–1972).

His studies at the Academy of Fine Arts in Stuttgart were followed by a prolonged period of study in the United States. There he worked on a series of photographs showing people in everyday situations. These became material for later work.

- Columbus/ Ohio, photo, 1971
- Soft Craws, pencil, tempera and opaque white on cardboard, 1972

Working since 1972 as a freelance painter and graphic artist, Kupke became a Member of the [Association of Baden-Württemberg Artists] in 1980. At this time he also produced cartoons, which were published in magazines and newspapers including Playboy, Il Mago der Stuttgarter Zeitung and Pardon. On the publication of his first cartoon strip "Horror Sapiens " in 1977 Joachim Kupke was described as "Höllenfürst der Zeichenfeder" (The Prince of Darkness of the quill).

- Cartoon, "Horror sapiens", 1977
- Cartoon, "Geschlossene Gesellschaft", 1983

During this period Kupke produced drawings and oil paintings, which grappled with paintings and art forms in unfamiliar and unusual ways.

- Landschaft mit Seiltänzer, Oil on Canvas, 1979/ 1980

After a series of solo and group exhibitions, in 1981 Kupke received a grant from the Arts Foundation of Baden-Württemberg. This was followed by a stipend from the city Sindelfingen in 1986. In 1995 Joachim Kupke married Sarah Webb (born 1960 in Bedford, UK), the educationalist and actress. Sarah Kupke has lived in Sindelfingen since 1990, where she is the Head of the International School of Stuttgart, Sindelfingen Campus.

== Work ==
Between 1963 and 1965, Jordi Pagans began visiting Cadaqués, a small town on the northern coast of Catalonia, Spain. The local landscape became a frequent subject of his work. Following this period, his paintings consistently featured distinct, structured shapes alongside a realistic and figurative style.

- Für Kläuschen ein schöner Hintergrund von Canaletto, pencil, crayon and paper, 1982

"Joachim Kupke’s works are created in an old master, realistic painting style. They use well-known works of art history, to which the artist feels an intimate relationship; a kind of kinship. They are not ironic re-creations or new creations. Rather, they have much more to do with the authenticity in what is represented and how it has been devaluated though mass media reproduction. Derived from our knowledge of the exponentially fragmentary nature of our perceptions and their connection with the widespread flood of pictures in all their reproduced manifestations, Kupke posits his technically brilliant commentary on art and art as art, about art.

- Pour Robert Lebel, Oil on Canvas, 2003

This is also true for the nascent years of the series "Room in Delft ". In these paintings Joachim Kupke brough the works of Jan Vermeer to the present day.

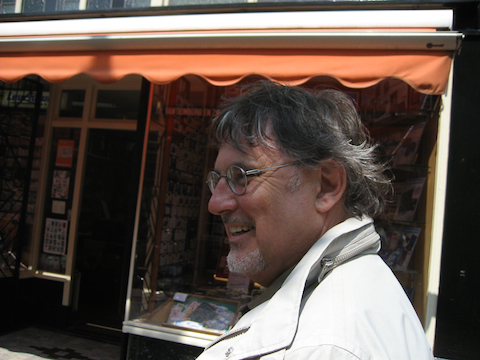
Joachim Kupke in Delft, 2010

- Zimmer in Delft (3), Oil on Canvas, 2006
- Zimmer in Delft (Mistress and Maid), Oil on Canvas, 2006
- Zimmer in New York, Oil on Canvas, 2010
- Zimmer in Delft (Passepartout), Oil on Canvas, 2010
- Kate Moss in Delft, Oil on Canvas, 2010/2011
- Allegory of Faith (Geertruyt Soup), Oil on Canvas, 2012
- Silence of Songbirds, Oil on Canvas, 2013/2014
- Dutch Interior No 1 (corrected Banksy), Oil on Canvas, 2014/ 2015

== Gallery ==
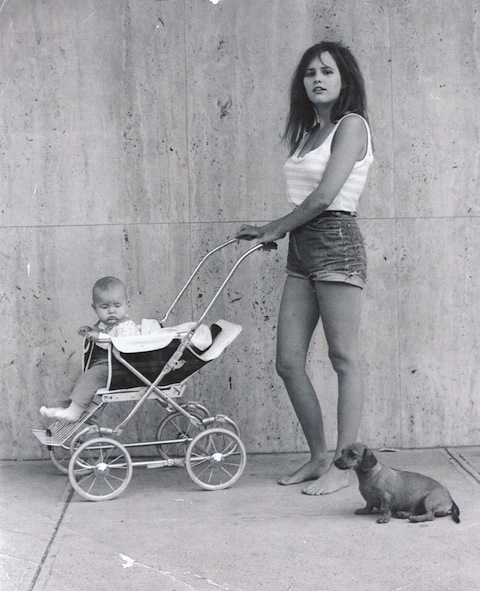
Columbus- Ohio, Joachim Kupke, 1971

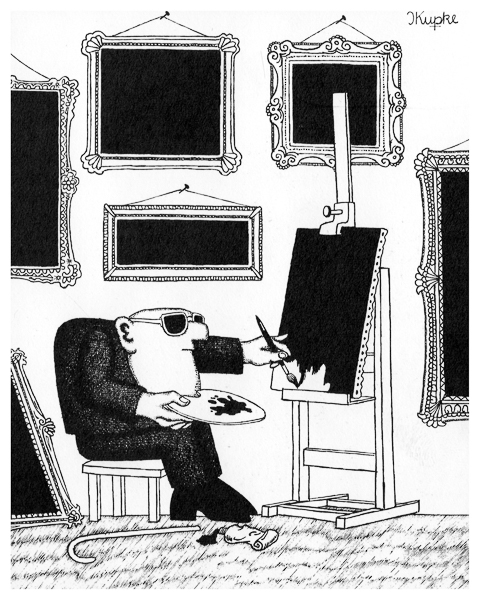
Horror sapiens, 1977, Joachim Kupke

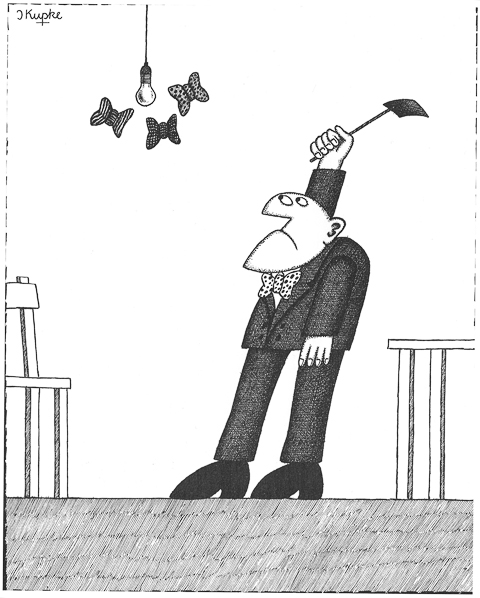
Geschlossene Gesellschaft, Cartoon, Joachim Kupke, 1983

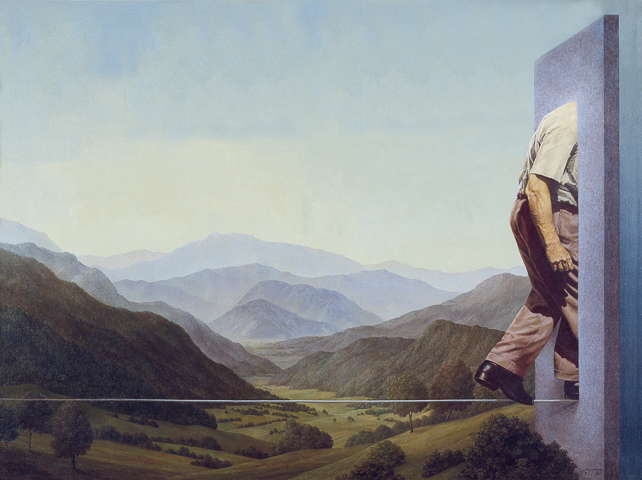
Landschaft mit Seiltänzer, Öl auf Leinwand, 1979

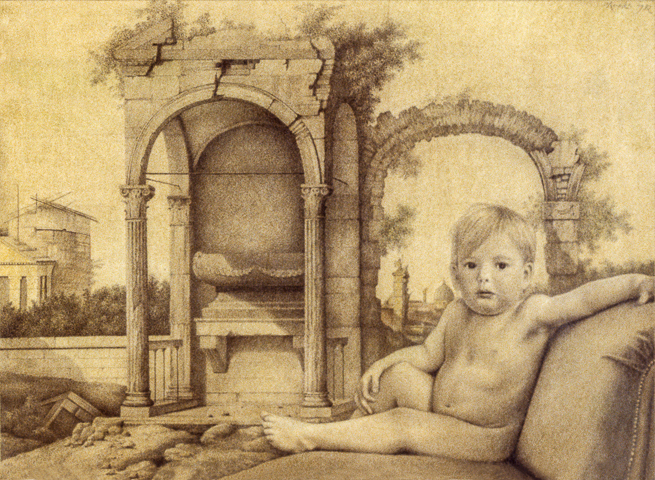
Für Kläuschen ein schöner Hintergrund von Canaletto, Joachim Kupke, Bleistift, Buntstift auf Papier, 1982

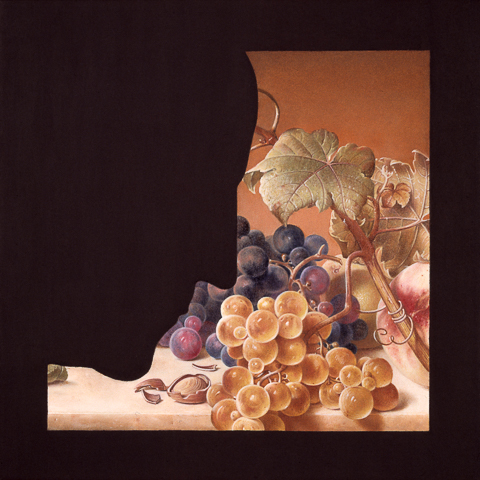
Pour Robert Lebel, Joachim Kupke, Acryl- Öl auf Leinwand, 2003

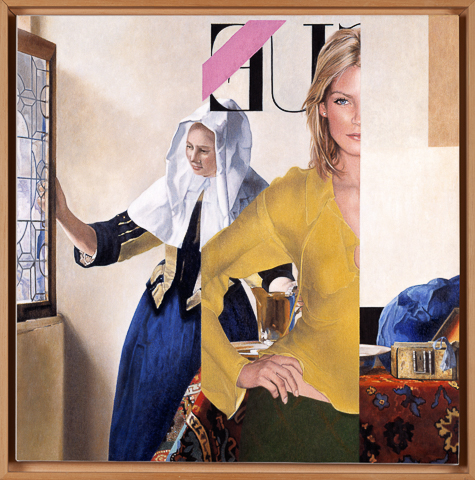
Zimmer in Delft(3), Joachim Kupke Öl auf Leinwand, 2006

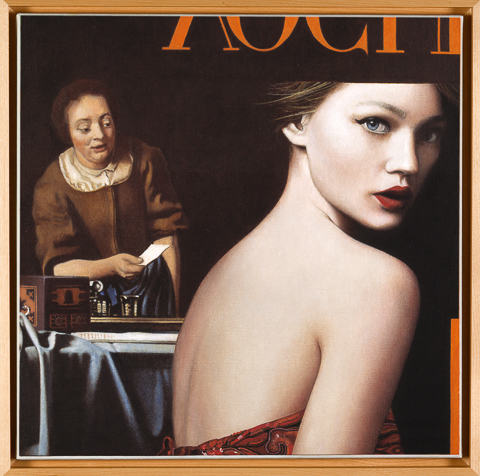
Zimmer in Delft (Mistress and Maid), Joachim Kupke, Öl auf Leinwand, 2007

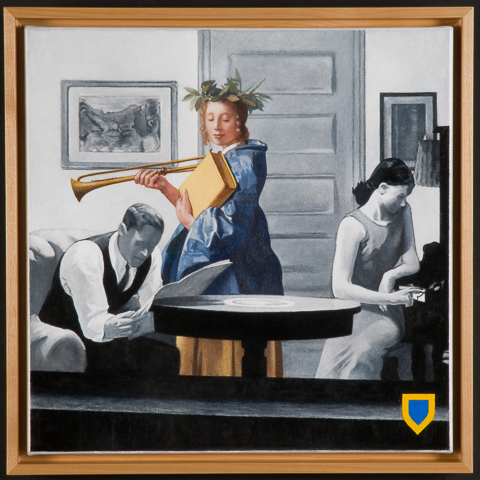
Zimmer in New York, Joachim Kupke, Öl auf Leinwand, 2009

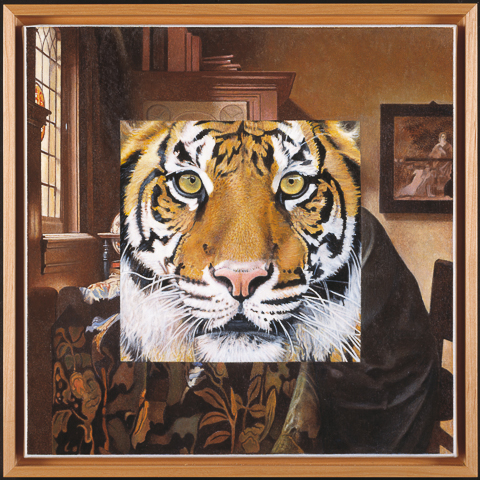
Zimmer in Delft Passepartout, Joachim Kupke 2010

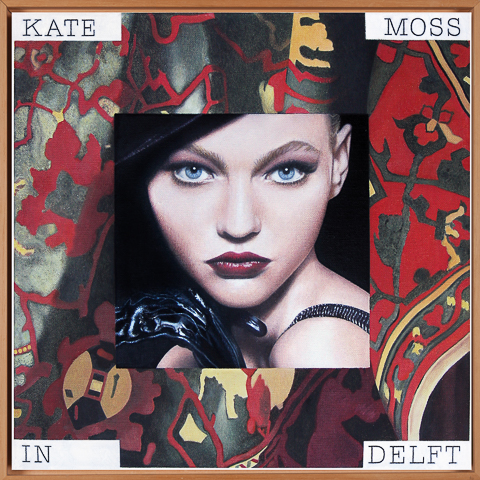
Kate Moss in Delft, Joachim Kupke 2010–2011

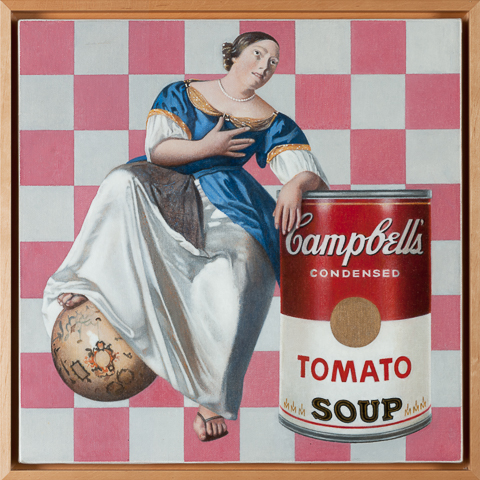
Allegory of Faith (Geertruyt Soup), Joachim Kupke 2012

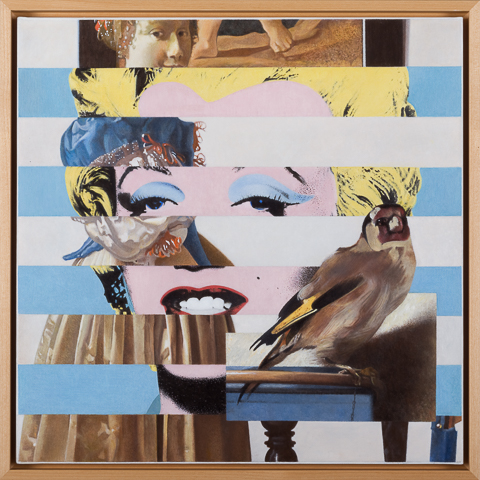
Silence of Songbirds, Joachim Kupke 2013- 2014

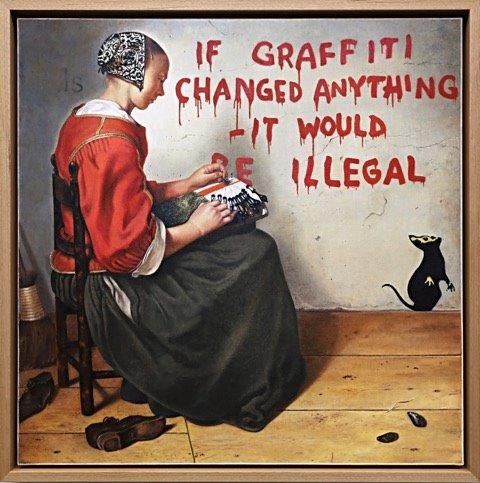
Dutch Interior No.1 (corrected Banksy) Joachim Kupke 2014 2015

== Solo exhibitions ==
- 1972 "Kritischer Realismus", Galerie am Jacobsbrunnen, Stuttgart
- 1974 Kunstverein Heidenheim, Galerie Akzent
- 1979 Galerie Walther, Düsseldorf
- 1983 Galerie der Stadt Sindelfingen
- 1990 Kleine Galerie des Kulturbundes, Torgau
- 1991 Galerie Zaiss, Aalen
- 1991 "Bilder", Kunstkreis Spaichingen
- 1994 "Rätsel des Verständlich Schönen", Galerie Burg, Leinfelden-Musberg
- 1997 "Ölbilder und Peintagen", Galerie Geiger, Kornwestheim
- 1999 "Ölbilder und Peintagen", Galerie Burg, Leinfelden-Musberg
- 2000 "Ölbilder und Peintagen", Galerie Geiger, Konstanz
- 2000 "Corrected Ready-Mades/ Peintagen", Galerie am Pfleghof, Tübingen
- 2003 "Kunst.Frauen" Kunstforum Weil der Stadt, Wendelinskapelle
- 2003 "Kunst.Frauen" Galerie am Pfleghof, Tübingen
- 2004 "Aperto", Galerie Geiger, Konstanz
- 2004 "Aperto", Galerie und Edition Zeherit, Dreisslingen-Lauffen
- 2006 "Das Gesamtwerk", Galerie der Stadt Sindelfingen
- 2007 "Appropriate Appropriations", neue Ölbilder und frühe Fotos, Galerie Geiger, Konstanz
- 2011 "12 Künstler – 12 Wege. Ausgangspunkt Stuttgarter Kunstakademie", Galerie Schlichtenmaler Stuttgart
- 2014 "Kate Moss in Delft", Malerei und Zeichnungen, Kultur- und Museumszentrum Schloss Glatt, Sulz am Neckar
- 2015 "Kate Moss in Delft", Galerie der Stadt Sindelfingen
- 2015 "Kate Moss in Delft", Galerie d'art, Corbeil-Essonnes, France
- 2017 "Homage to Modern Art", Galerie Schlichtenmaier, Schloss Dätzingen, Grafenau

== Selected group exhibitions ==
- 1970 "Vier junge Künstler aus Frankreich und Deutschland", Kurfürstliches Schloss Mainz
- 1971 "Internationaler Salon Paris Sud", Juvisy, France
- 1973 Museum zu Allerheiligen, Schaffhausen, Switzerland
- ab 1973 Teilnahme an Jahresausstellungen des Künstlerbundes Baden- Württemberg und des Württembergischen Kunstvereins
- 1978 Sechzehn Künstler, Württembergischer Kunstverein Stuttgart
- 1979 "25 Ans d'Art en Baden-Württemberg", Palais du Rhin, Straßburg/France
- 1988 "2 villes 5 artistes", CAC Pablo Neruda, Corbeil-Essonnes/France
- 2005 "15 aus 30", 30 Jahre Galerie Geiger, Konstanz
- 2006 "Figurative Bildwelten", Galerie Schlichtenmaler, Stuttgart
- 2007 "Gestochen scharf! Die Kunst zu reproduzieren", Zeppelin Museum, Friedrichshafen
- 2007 "Die Surrealität des Alltäglichen", Galerie Schlichtenmaler, Stuttgart
- 2013 "Das Antlitz!", Württembergischer Kunstverein Stuttgart

== Literature ==
- Kupke Imagines, bilingual Book, Introduction by Otto Pannewitz, Photos und Edition: Monika Houck, 2016, ISBN 978-3-00-054235-0
- Kate Moss in Delft, Text von Otto Pannewitz. Galerie der Stadt Sindelfingen, 2014, ISBN 3-928222-51-1
- Das Gesamtwerk, Text von Otto Pannewitz. Galerie der Stadt Sindelfingen, 2006 ISBN 3-928222-43-0
- Aperto. Text von Stephan Geiger, Galerie Geiger, Konstanz, 2004 ISBN 3-9809227-1-5
- Kunst, Frauen. Text von Veronika Burger, Galerie am Pfleghof, Tübingen, 2003
- Corrected Ready-Mades. Peintagen Text von Veronika Burger, Galerie am Pfleghof, Tübingen, 2000
- Rätsel des Verständlich-Schönen. Text von Otto Pannewitz, Galerie der Stadt Sindelfingen, 1993, ISBN 3-928222-10-4
- Joachim Kupke. Text von Friedhelm Röttger und Elke Rothmund, Verlag C.F. Rees Heidenheim, 1983
- Geschlossene Gesellschaft, Texte Verlag Tübingen, 1983, ISBN 3-88213-024-5
- Horror Sapiens. Text von Ruprecht Skasa-Weiss, Texte Verlag Tübingen, 1977, ISBN 3-88213-002-4
- Gereimt ist alles möglich. Text: Braun, Günther; Illustrationen: Kupke, Joachim, Stuttgart, Deutsche Verlagsanstalt, 1974, ISBN 3-421-01698-4
