= Cristin Claas =

German vocalist and jazz singer

Cristin Claas (born 1977 in Bernburg) is a German vocalist and jazz singer. She is the vocalist in her band, the Cristin Claas Trio, along with guitarist Stephan Bormann and percussionist Christoph Reuter.

== History ==
Despite early musical encouragement and promise, Claas only chose to make music her calling in her mid-20s. In 2002 she began jazz studies in Weimar. Three years later she moved to Leipzig, where she has since focused entirely on her own music. She formed her band in 2001, and it became a trio in 2002. She has released six albums: Twilight (2003), Favour (2005/Acoustic Music Records), In the shadow of your words (2007/Sony BMG), Paperskin (2008/Sony BMG), In Zeiten Wie Diesen' (In Times Like These; 2010) and 67 Days (2013). Since its founding, the trio has been on tour many times and has earned a reputation for its live performances.

== Music ==
Working in the singer-songwriter tradition, Cristin Class often incorporates elements of pop as well as the more classic art song or Lied. Through joint projects with various orchestras in Germany as well as the band l'arc six, the group maintains close ties to the classical music world; some of these pieces are included on the album Paperskin.

The group’s compositions tend to be mostly song-oriented and rely less so on the improvisational character so widespread in jazz. The trio itself refers to its style as Songpoesie (song poetry). Performed live, the works are augmented by spontaneous elements, including body percussion and musically vocalized expressions.

== Lyrics ==
Cristin Claas's lyrics tend to the lyrical and pictorial; she will occasionally reset well-known poems such as Goethe’s Heidenröslein or the well-known evening song Der Mond ist aufgegangen in her own, unique style. Of special note is her tendency to compose her lyrics for both English and German. Additionally, the singer frequently draws on her own, onomatopoeic fantasy language.

== Discography ==
- Twilight (2003)
- Favour (2005/ Acoustic Music Records)
- In the shadow of your words (2007/ Sony BMG)
- Paperskin (2008/ Sony BMG)
- In Zeiten wie diesen (2010)
- 67 Days (2013)
- Back in time (2017)
- Frei (2018)
