= Sindelfingen =

- Town
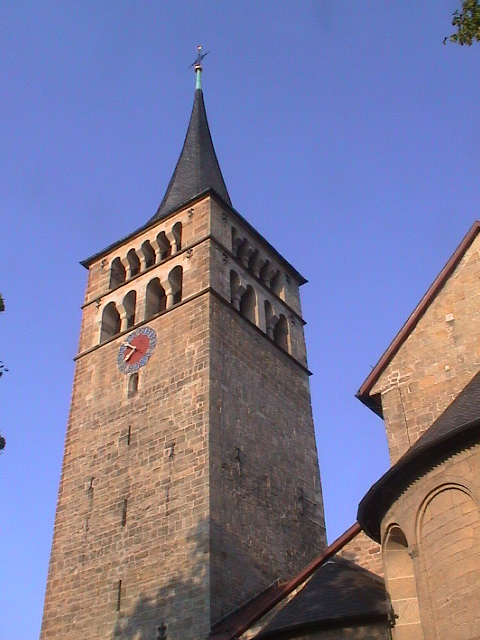
- St. Martin, the Lutheran main church

- Coat of arms

- Location of Sindelfingen within Böblingen district
- Interactive map of Sindelfingen
- Location within Germany Location within Baden-Württemberg
- Coordinates: 48°42′48″N 9°0′10″E
- Country: Germany
- State: Baden-Württemberg
- Admin. region: Stuttgart
- District: Böblingen

Government
  - Mayor (2017–25): Bernd Vöhringer (CDU)

Area
  - Total: 50.83 km^{2} (19.63 sq mi)
- Elevation: 449 m (1,473 ft)

Population (2025-12-31)
  - Total: 61,428
  - Density: 1,208/km^{2} (3,130/sq mi)
- Time zone: UTC+01:00 (CET)
  - Summer (DST): UTC+02:00 (CEST)
- Postal codes: 71043–71069
- Dialling codes: 07031
- Vehicle registration: BB
- Website: www.sindelfingen.de

Sindelfingen (German pronunciation: [ˈzɪndl̩ˌfɪŋən]; Swabian: Sendlfenga) is a city in Baden-Württemberg in south Germany. It lies near Stuttgart at the headwaters of the Schwippe (a tributary of the river Würm), and is home to a Mercedes-Benz assembly plant. The current mayor of the city of Sindelfingen is Dr. Bernd Vöhringer.

== History ==
- 1155 – First documented mention of Sindelfingen
- 1263 – Sindelfingen was founded by Count Rudolf Scherer of Tübingen-Herrenberg
- 1351 – The city was sold to Württemberg
- Middle Ages – Notable weaving industry
- 1535 – Entrance of the Protestant Reformation
- 1944 – Stuttgart/Sindelfingen oil refinery bombed by the Oil Campaign of World War II
- 1962 – Sindelfingen became a "Große Kreisstadt" (city with special governmental responsibilities within the larger county)
- 1971 – Municipal annexation of the neighbouring villages Maichingen and Darmsheim
- 1987 – The final traditional Sindelfinger Volksfest was held (the site was later required for a state-level horticulture and landscaping exhibition)

The weaving industry survived until most of Europe's textile industry was devastated by Asian imports. Some textile distribution centres are still left in the city. Former weaving mills can still be found in the city area, now used as offices for the computer industry. This is due to the takeover of Hollerith by IBM which used the punched card technology from the weaving mills.

== Geography ==
Neighbouring towns and cities: Böblingen (contiguous), Stuttgart (15 km), Leonberg. The highest point is 531 meters above sea level and to the north is the Glemswald (nature reserve).

== Points of interest ==
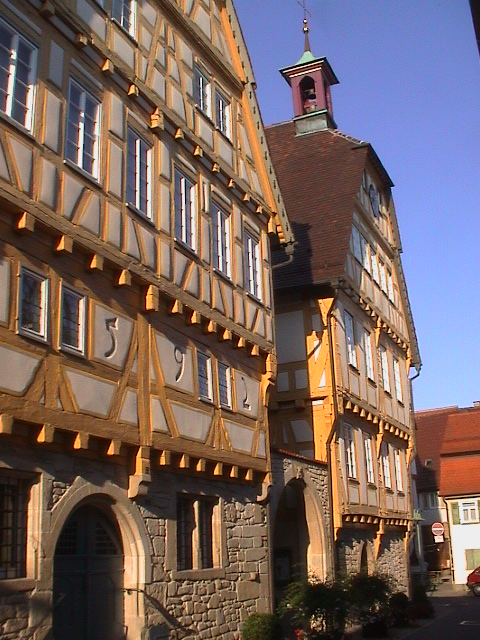
Old city hall

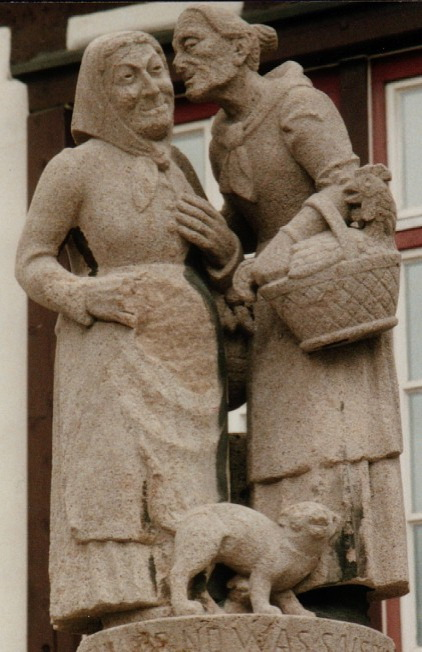
Statue of gossips in the Old town of Sindelfingen

- Old city hall, now a city museum
- St. Martin (consecrated 1083)
- A short alley with half timbered houses (Fachwerkhäusern)
- Old cemetery (behind the city library)
- Witch's Leap
- Kloster Pond
- Donaschwaben Haus museum
- Large public swimming pool with a long water slide
- Water tower on Goldberg
- Water tower Sindelfingen-Steige
- Water tower Sindelfingen-Eichholz
- Friendship Fountain on the market place, designed by Bonifatius Stirnberg. Around a central fountain with the Pegasus are six small fountains representing the six partner towns of Sindelfingen. The figures can rotate.
- Miniature Railway in the Sommerhofen Park
- Powerline-branch Maichingen
- Zweigart-Sawitzki-Bridge
- High-based pylons
- TV repeater Darmsheim
- Transmitter Tower Fuchsberg
- Transmitter Tower service area Forest of Sindelfingen
- Mercedes-Benz Group AG factory. Tours can be arranged through Mercedes dealers.
- Haus zur Geschichte der IBM Datenverarbeitung (IBM Dataprocessing History Museum)

== Culture ==
Sindelfingen has an annual International Street Fair which features ethnic food and performances from the partner cities, as well as from various local ethnic clubs.

== Demographics ==
The resident counts below are either estimates, based upon census (*) or official records of respective statistical offices. All figures after 1871 are taken from the statistical office of Baden-Württemberg.

Year	Residents
1500	c. 1,000
1600	c. 1,400
1702	1,402
1803	2,981
1850	4,310
1861	3,804
1. December 1871*	3,704
1 December 1880*	3,934
1 December 1890*	4,239
1 December 1900*	4,291
1 December 1910*	4,589
16 June 1925*	5,394
16 June 1933*	6,986

Year	Residents
17 May 1939*	8,465
1946	10,027
13 September 1950*	11,448
6 June 1961*	26,127
27 May 1970*	40,785
31 December 1975	54,134
31 December 1980	54,808
27 May 1987*	57,005
31 December 1990	58,805
31 December 1995	59,435
31 December 2000	60,843
31 December 2005	60,843
31 December 2010	60,445

== Mercedes-Benz factory ==
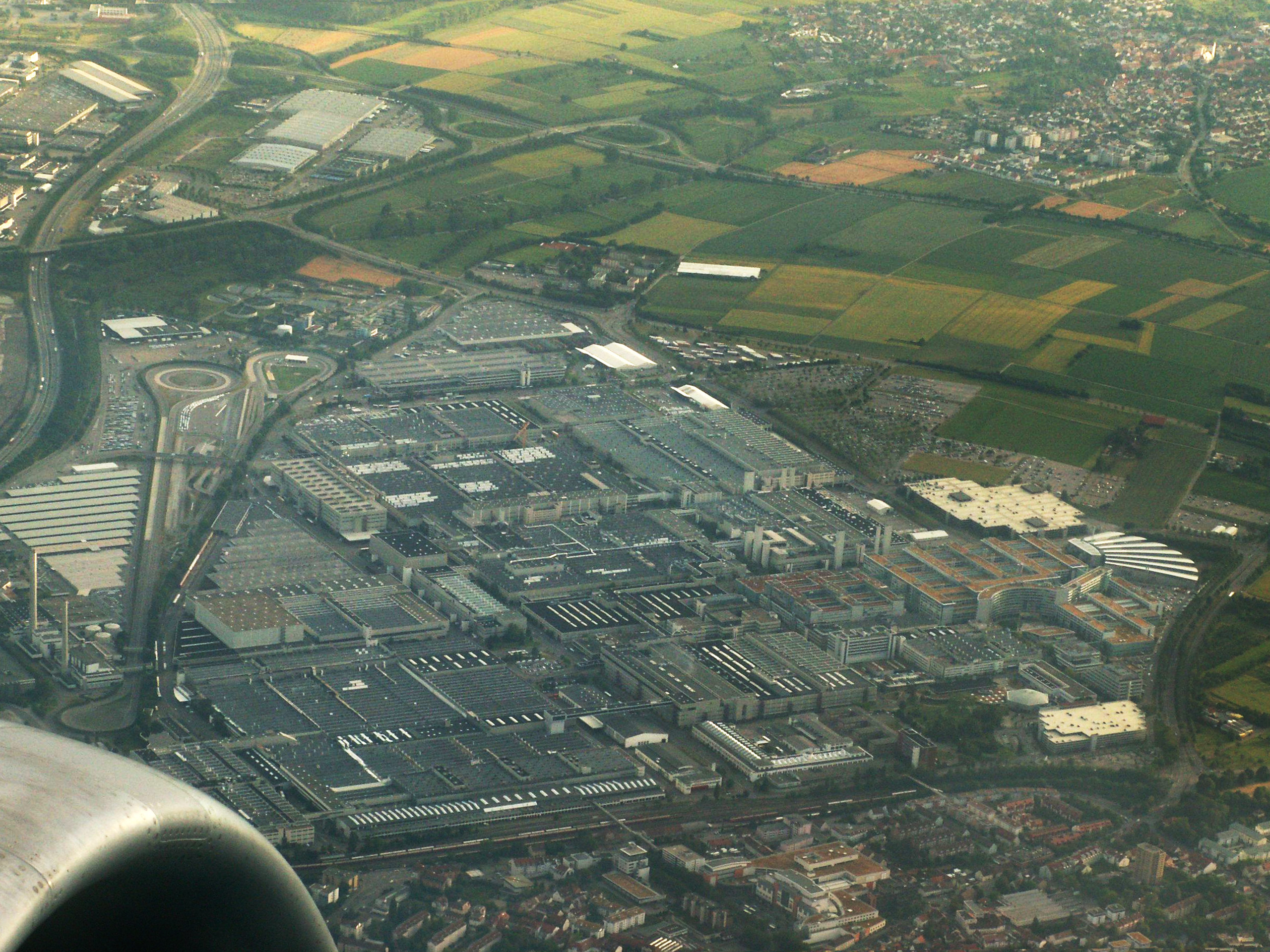
The Mercedes-Benz factory

The factory was founded in 1915 by Daimler Motoren Gesellschaft to produce aircraft engines, hence the plant initially had a runway located onsite. Post-World War I the first passenger car was manufactured, following the merger with Benz & Cie. founded by Karl Benz. In 1926, the entire body shop of the new Daimler-Benz group was relocated to the Sindelfingen plant, allowing plant manager Wilhelm Friedle to introduce assembly line production the following year, and in 1929 the first press shop was opened. By 1938 the plant employed about 6,500 people, and in the lead-in to World War II most production was aligned to military contracts, mainly trucks such as the LC 3000; passenger car production ceased by 1942. Initially replacing male workers with local women, Mercedes then took forced labour, including prisoners of war. Western European prisoners were initially housed in near-by boarding houses, but with the start of the Eastern front the local Nazi administration formed the co-located Riedmühle concentration camp, which from 1942 loaned workers to the company in return for payment to the Nazi Government in Berlin. By 1944, almost half of Daimler Benz's 63,610 Daimler Benz employees were civilian forced labourers. Post-WW2, Daimler-Benz admitted its links with the Nazi regime, and became involved in the German Industry Foundation's initiative "Remembrance, Responsibility and Future".

With heavy Allied bombing, the town and plant were not suitably reconstructed until late 1946, with resumed production of the Mercedes-Benz W136. Two-shift production was introduced from 1950, with the relocation of final car assembly to the plant, meaning that by 1955 80,500 cars were manufactured. The Mercedes-Benz W116 was first produced in 1972, the first model of the Mercedes-Benz S-Class, which the plant still produces today as the current model Mercedes-Benz W223. Until 2015, the plant was the top-producing Daimler AG plant, when with 319,000 vehicles manufactured it was overtaken by the Bremen plant with 324,000.

Today, covering 2,955,944 m^{2} with a production area of 1,305,557 m^{2}, the 37,000 people employed (April 2016 – around 10,000 are research and development), the plant still produces over 300,000 vehicles per year, around 15% of total Daimler Group vehicle production. Second in production scale to Bremen in the Daimler Group, it is the third largest vehicle manufacturing plant in Germany, behind Volkswagen's Wolfsburg plant and the Audi plant at Ingolstadt.

== Transport ==
Sindelfingen can be reached through the A8 and A81 motorways, and through the S-Bahn connections to Stuttgart or Herrenberg. The nearest airport is the Stuttgart Airport.

== Twin towns – sister cities ==
Sindelfingen is twinned with:

- Schaffhausen, Switzerland (1952)
- Corbeil-Essonnes, France (1961)
- Sondrio, Italy (1962)
- Dronfield, England, United Kingdom (1981)
- Torgau, Germany (1988)
- Győr, Hungary (1989)
- Chełm, Poland (2001)
- East Samos, Greece (2023)

Sindelfingen also cooperates with the Eurotowns network.

== Notable people ==
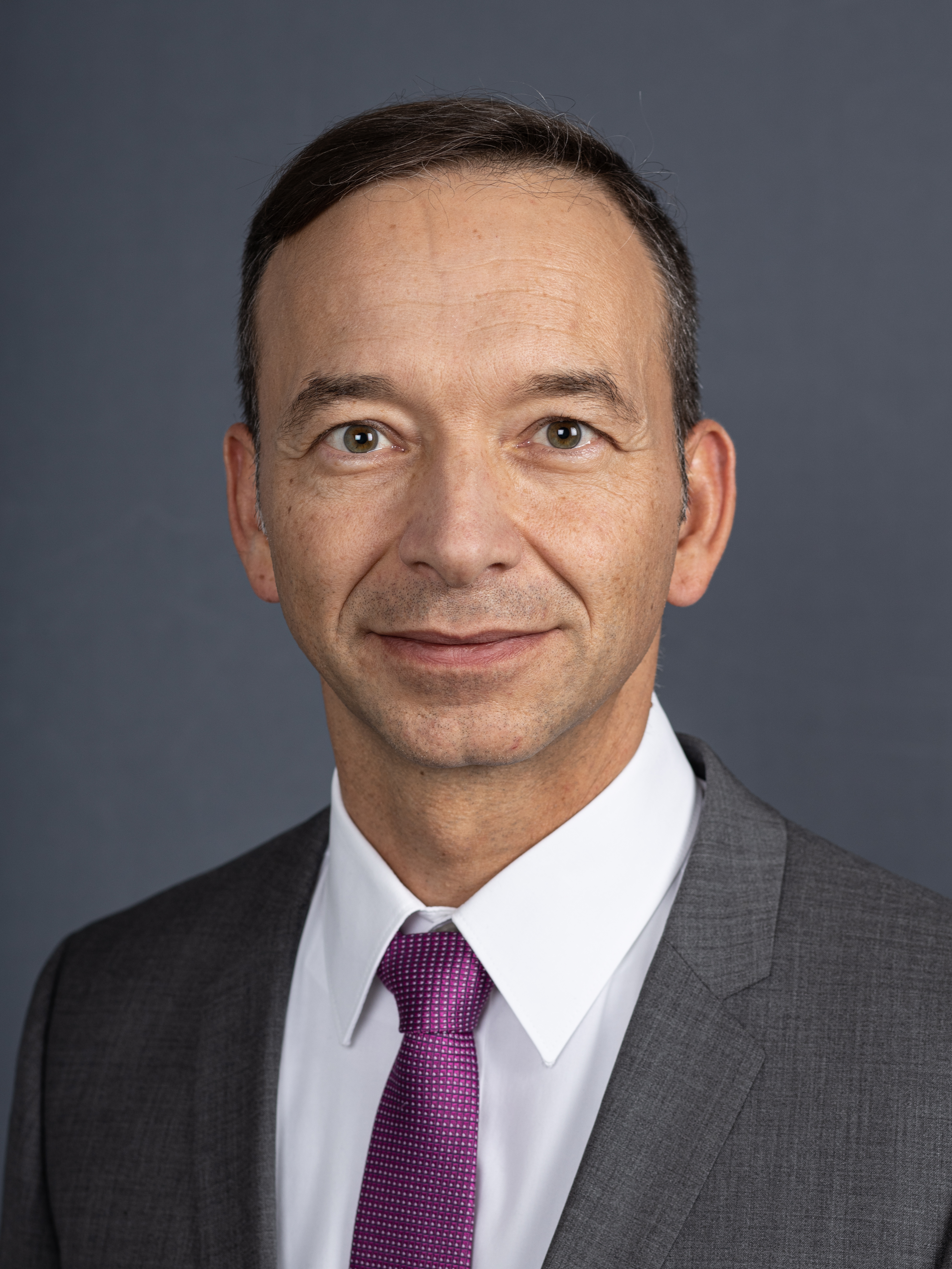
Pascal Kober, 2020

- Carl Eytel (1862–1925), German-American artist
- Roland Emmerich (born 1955), film producer, director and author, grew up here
- Margret Fusbahn (1907–2001), German aviator with street named after her
- Joachim Kupke (born 1947), artist
- Jens Marquardt (born 1967), motor sports engineer and manager of Toyota Motorsport GmbH
- Gisela Splett (born 1967), politician
- Marlis Petersen (born 1968), operatic coloratura soprano, lives in Athens.
- Henschel, siblings, Monika (born 1968), Christoph (born 1969) & Markus (born 1969), musicians
- Pascal Kober (born 1971), a military chaplain and politician (FDP)
- Cubeatz (born 1991), hip-hop production duo by twins Kevin and Tim Gomringer.

=== Sport ===
- Sascha Reinelt (born 1973), former field hockey player and team bronze medallist at the 2004 Summer Olympics
- Marko Kopilas (born 1983), a Croatian retired footballer who played 369 games
- Michael Klauß (born 1987), footballer who has played over 370 games
- Amar Rahmanović (born 1994), footballer who has played over 250 games
