= Selbitz (river) =

River in Germany

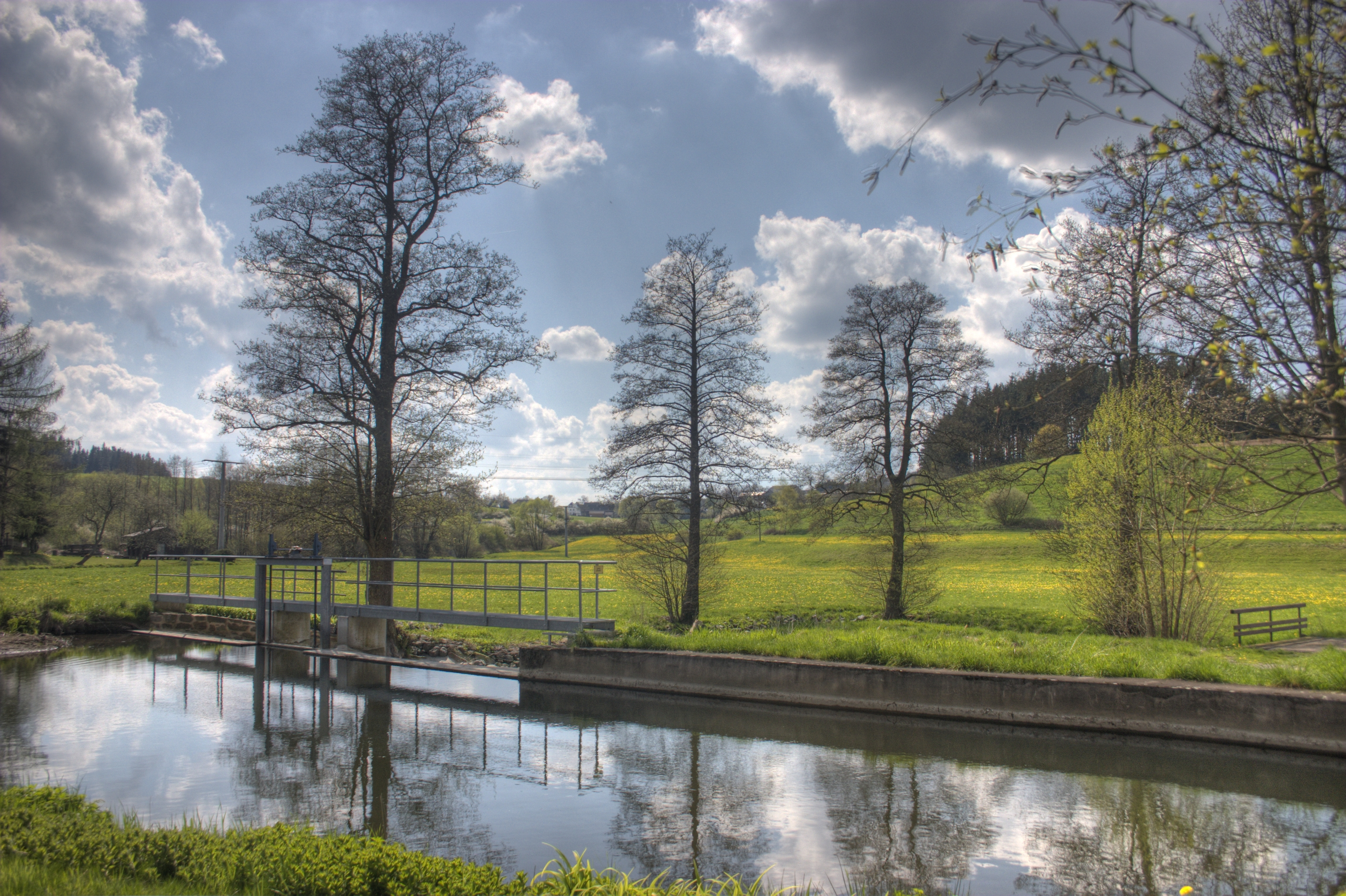
- View of the Selbitz Valley from the Hagen mill at Schauenstein

Location
- Country: Germany
- State: Bavaria

Physical characteristics
- Source
  - location: NW of Wüstenselbitz
  - coordinates: 50.221447°N 11.687194°E
  - elevation: 650 m (2,130 ft)
- Mouth
  - location: Saale at Blankenstein near Bad Lobenstein
  - coordinates: 50.402011°N 11.701953°E
- Length: 36.8 km (22.9 mi)
- Basin size: 246 km^{2} (95 sq mi)

Basin features
- Progression: Saale→ Elbe→ North Sea
- Towns and villages: Helmbrechts, Schauenstein, Selbitz, Naila, Lichtenberg, Issigau, Blankenstein

The Selbitz (German pronunciation: [ˈzɛlbɪts]) is a river of Bavaria and Thuringia, Germany.

It is a left-bank tributary of the river Saale in the eastern Franconian Forest. It is a watercourse of tertiary importance. Its source lies about 650 metres (2,130 ft) above sea level from a pond northwest of the Helmbrechts quarter of Wüstenselbitz, flows around Helmbrechts at first in an easterly direction and then towards the north. As it continues it runs through the towns of Schauenstein, Selbitz and Naila, before flowing through the Höllental between Hölle and Blechschmidtenhammer cutting a channel into the dolorite rock up to 170 m (560 ft) deep.

In the village of Hölle, a district of Naila on the left bank of the Selbitz, a 262-metre-deep (860 ft) mineral spring, the Höllensprudel, has been bored. From the mouth of the Thüringische Muschwitz at the exit of the Hölle Valley and at its own confluence with the Saale near Blankenstein, the Selbitz forms the border between Bavaria and Thuringia for about 2 kilometres (1.2 mi). During the Cold War division of Germany (1945–1990), the Selbitz was part of the inner German border, with fences and guard towers on the Thuringian side in the German Democratic Republic to prevent east-west traffic.

The footbridge between the Bavarian hamlet of Untereichenstein and Blankenstein is also the end of the Thuringian Rennsteig, a historical border path.

The river is 36.6 kilometres (22.7 mi) long and falls a total of 236 metres (774 ft) during its course. The name "Selbitz" probably comes from the Slavic word zelenovica and would therefore mean something like "green stream".

At almost any point the level of the Selbitz could rise theoretically without causing any problems, because it is mostly surrounded by meadows and in the town of Naila flows through a natural, but reinforced, channel between the station and the bridge by the football pitch. This enables the river to grow to more than twice its width during times of thaw, storms or heavy rain. From 2 to 4 December 2007 this could be observed. The area through which the river runs is surrounded to the left and right by strips of grassland that are used as meadows for sheep-grazing during times of the year when there is no snow.

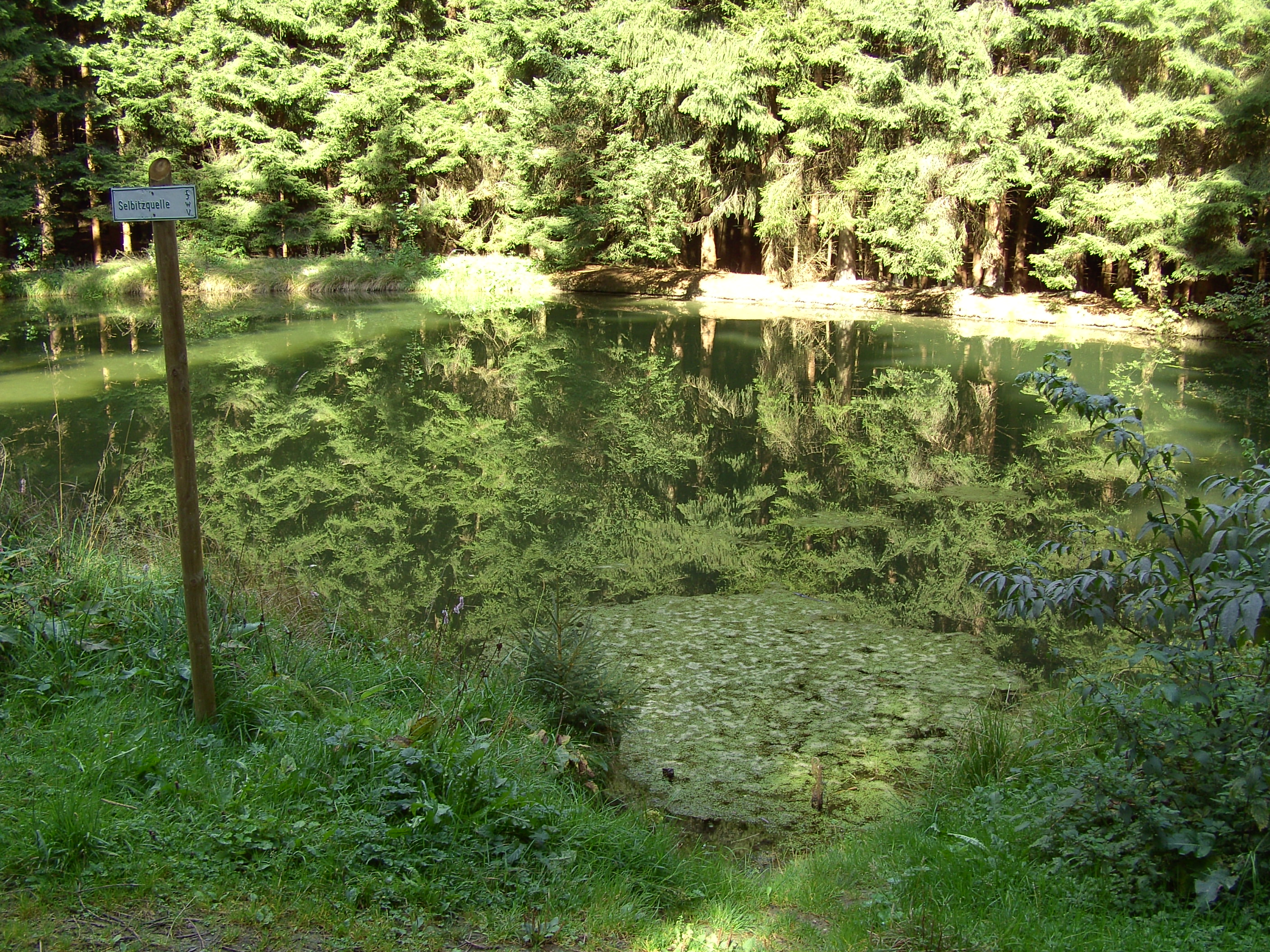
Source of the Selbitz

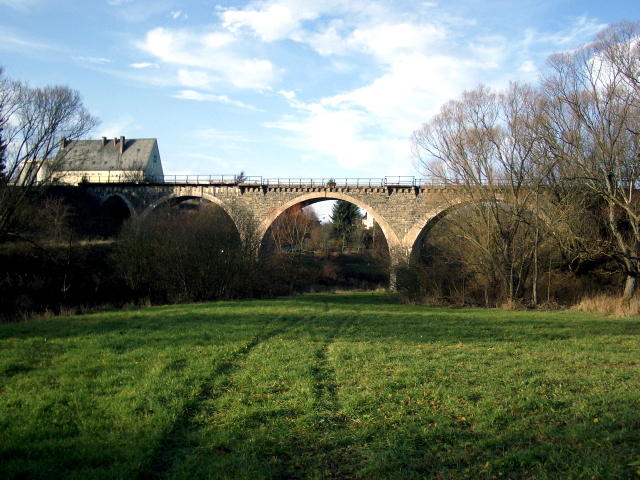
Railway bridge over the Selbitz at Naila

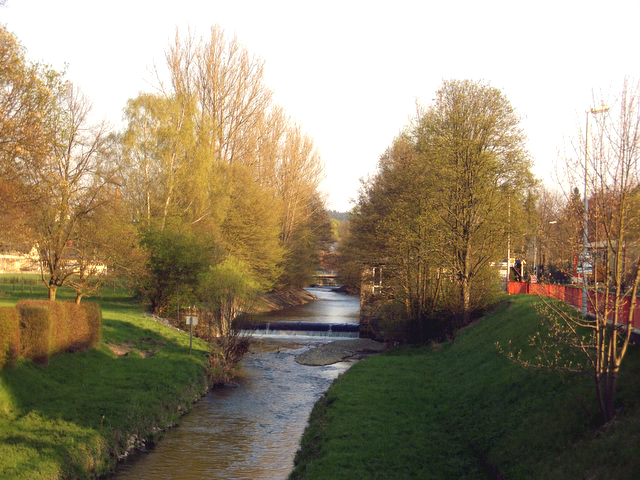
Weir in the Selbitz at Naila station

== See also ==
- List of rivers of Bavaria

== Literature ==
- Johann Kaspar Bundschuh (1802), "Selbitz", Geographisches Statistisch-Topographisches Lexikon von Franken (Geographical Statistical-Topographic Lexicon of Franconia) (in German), vol. 5: S–U, Ulm: Verlag der Stettinischen Buchhandlung, OCLC 833753112, 790364328
