= Arnold Friedrich =

German municipal politician

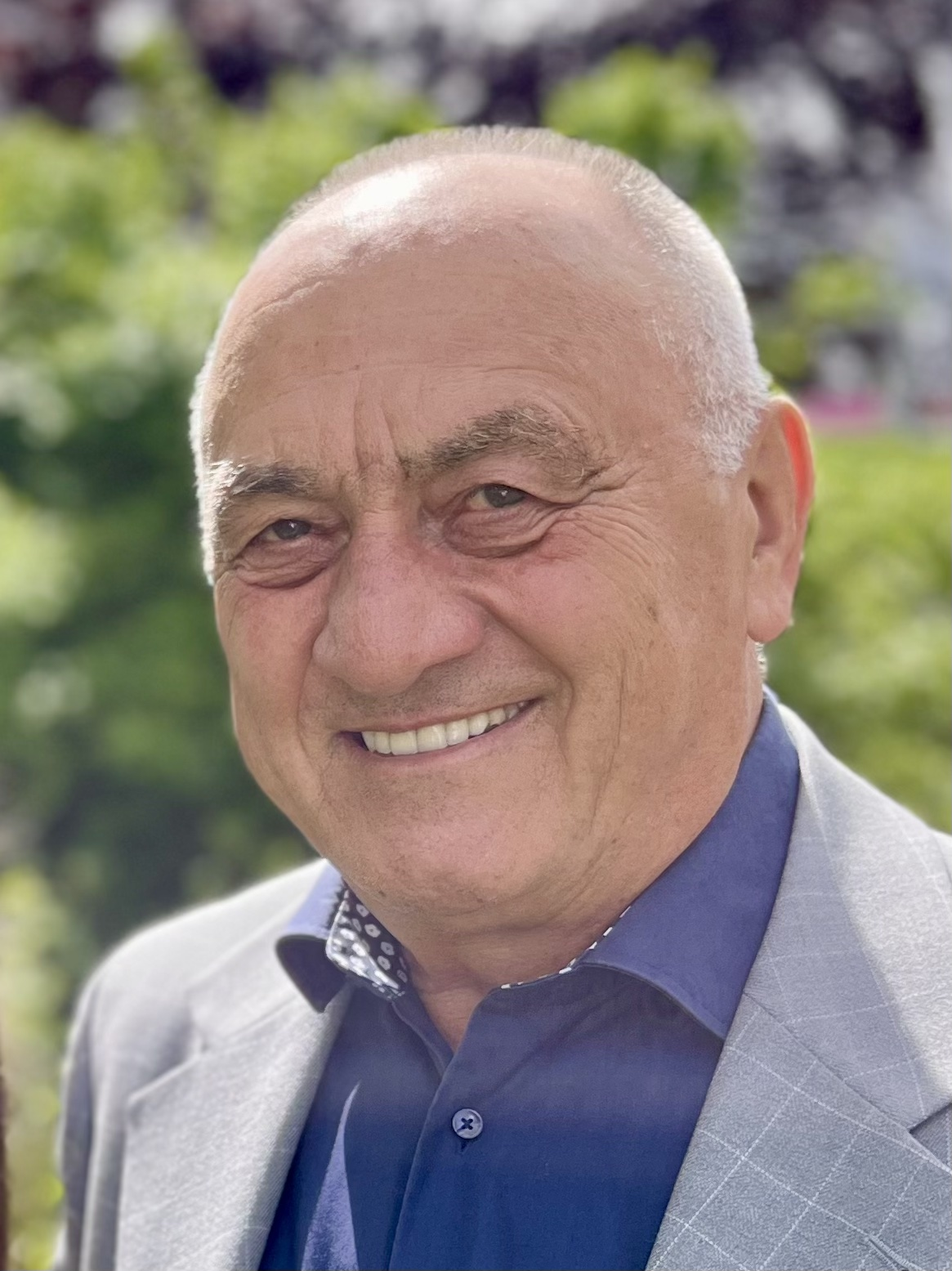

Mayor of Töpen
- In office March 1978 – April 2002
- Preceded by: Hermann Schultz
- Succeeded by: Klaus Grünzner (CSU)

Personal details
- Born: 12 October 1947 (age 78) Töpen, Bavaria, Germany
- Party: FW
- Spouse: Doris Friedrich
- Children: 2

Arnold Friedrich (born October 12, 1947 in Töpen) is a German former municipal politician, public administrator and a contemporary witness to the Division of Germany and German reunification. He served as mayor of the municipality of Töpen in the district of Hof in Bavaria from 1979 to 2008, and is known for his role in the preservation and development of Mödlareuth, a village divided during the Cold War by the Inner German border. He is a co-founder of the German-German Museum Mödlareuth, and long-time chairman of the museum’s sponsoring association.

== Early life ==
The foundation of both the Federal Republic of Germany and the German Democratic Republic (GDR) in 1949 established the Inner German Border. Arnold Friedrich grew up in Töpen, Upper Franconia, a municipality located directly on the demarcation line between Bavaria and Thuringia. From 1952 to 1966, Töpen was one of the few zonal border crossing points for transit traffic between Bavaria and West Berlin, a circumstance that influenced Friedrich’s early experiences of Germany’s division.

He attended primary school in Töpen and subsequently completed his secondary education in the nearby town of Hof. After leaving school with the Mittlere Reife (intermediate secondary school certificate), Friedrich completed a full apprenticeship as a heating and ventilation systems technician (Heizungs- und Lüftungsbauer), qualifying in a skilled trade before entering public service.

== Career ==
From 1967 to 1975, Friedrich served with the GSA I/2 of the Bundesgrenzschutz (Federal Border Protection). His duties included patrol service and border postings within the zone 30 kilometres (19 mi) deep along the 'three-states' border region (Czech Republic–Saxony–Bavaria), extending as far as Bad Steben, in the immediate vicinity of his home village.

After completing his service with the Federal Border Protection, Friedrich transferred to the Bavarian internal administrative service and became chief administrative officer of the municipality of Köditz in the district of Hof.

In 1978, he began his local political career as a member of the municipal council, and one year later, at the age of 31, he was elected mayor of the municipality of Töpen. Friedrich focused his primary efforts on village renewal (or village rejuvenation), the improvement of the local infrastructure, and attracting commercial enterprises (e.g. the Lidl and Dennree warehouse and distribution centers). During his term of office, a modernized sewage system was constructed in the villages of Töpen and Isaar. Together with the municipality of Feilitzsch, the reliable supply of drinking water was secured through the development of new high-yield wells and the connection to the Upper Franconia long-distance water supply system.

In 1992, Friedrich transferred to the Thuringian administrative service and became chief administrative officer of the town of Gefell. In 2002, he did not stand for re-election and, upon his retirement from office, was appointed honorary citizen and honorary former mayor (Altbürgermeister) of Töpen.

== Role in Mödlareuth ==
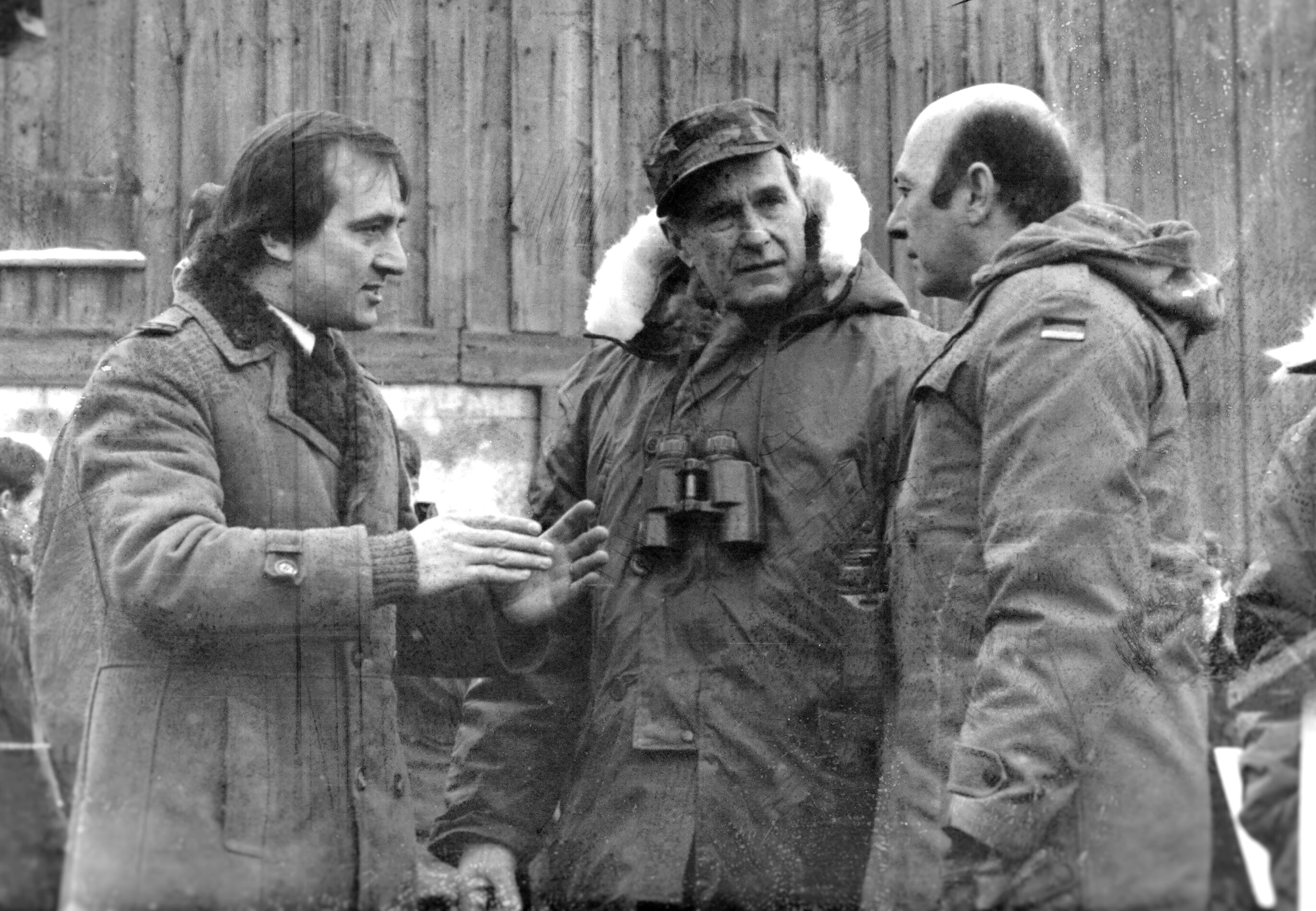
US Vice President George Bush visits "Little Berlin" on Feb 5, 1983; to his left Arnold Friedrich the mayor, to his right Manfred Wörner, German Minister of Defence.

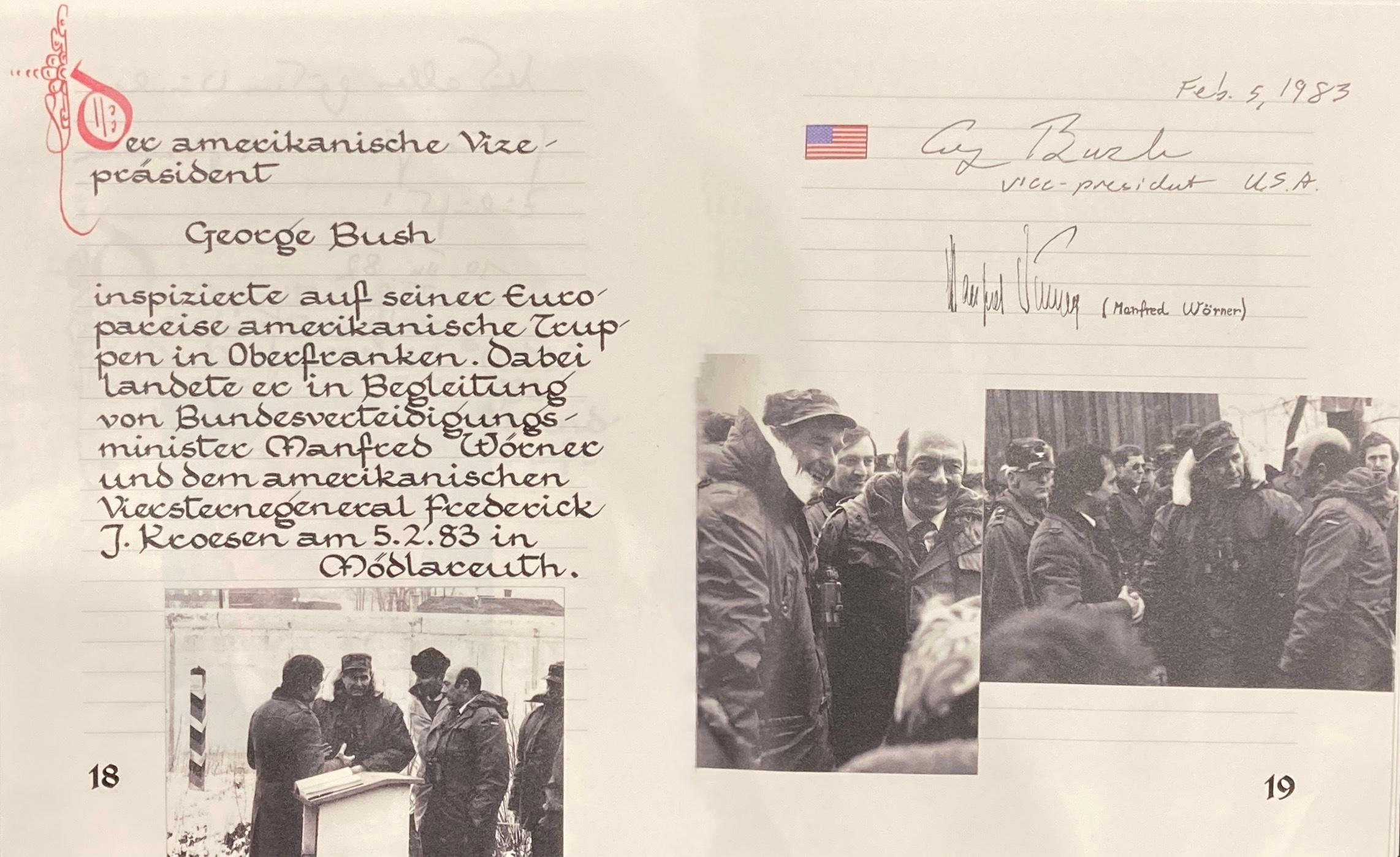
Pages 18–19 of the visitors' log of Mödlareuth documenting the visit of U.S. Vice President Bush to Mödlareuth on February 5, 1983

The Bavarian part of the formerly divided village of Mödlareuth also belongs to the municipality of Töpen. As a symbol of German division, the so-called "Little Berlin" was a focal point of media and political attention. As host mayor, Friedrich personally welcomed many national and international figures. Among the numerous visitors were George H. W. Bush, Otto von Habsburg, Karl Carstens, Helmut Kohl, Manfred Wörner, Georg Freiherr von Waldenfels, and Anna Fisher.

Friedrich was among the co-organisers of the candlelight demonstration in the western part of Mödlareuth on December 5, 1989, which aimed to promote the opening of the wall in Mödlareuth. Construction work began on December 7, and on December 9 an official pedestrian border crossing was established.

On June 17, 1990, Friedrich and his Thuringian counterpart oversaw the partial removal of the Mödlareuth wall during an event commemorating the former national holiday of the Federal Republic of Germany. This event, which was not coordinated with authorities or security forces, preceded efforts by Friedrich and filmmaker Arndt Schaffner to document the division of the village and to advocate for the partial preservation of the border installations. Together, they began establishing the German-German Museum in autumn 1990, with Schaffner assuming directorship and Friedrich taking on the chairmanship of the sponsoring association. The museum officially opened in 1994.

As chief administrative officer of the town of Gefell — since 1998, the Thuringian part of Mödlareuth belongs to Gefell — he was responsible for Mödlareuth both as honorary mayor on the Bavarian side and as chief administrator on the Thuringian side.

Despite public subsidies, the sponsoring association was unable to finance the German-German Museum on a permanent basis. In January 2006, the museum’s funding was secured through the establishment of a inter-state special-purpose association, comprising the districts of Hof (Bavaria), Vogtland (Saxony), and Saale-Orla (Thuringia), as well as the municipalities of Töpen and Gefell.

== Awards ==
- 1995: Order of Merit of the Federal Republic of Germany awarded by Federal President Roman Herzog for his lifetime achievement in the service of German reunification
- 1999: Kommunale Verdienstmedaille des Bayerischen Innenministeriums in Bronze
- 1999: Municipal Medal of Merit in Bronze from the Bavarian Ministry of the Interior
- 2002: Appointed honorary former mayor (Altbürgermeister) and honorary citizen of the municipality of Töpen
- 2010: Bavarian State Medal in Bronze, awarded by the Bavarian State Minister for Food, Agriculture and Forestry

== Sources ==
- European Commission - EU Community Research and Development Information Service (CORDIS), Border Discourse: Changing Identities, Changing Nations, Changing Stories in European Border Communities, July 2000.
- Haus der Bayerischen Geschichte, Thematische Zeitzeugeninterviews mit Arnold Friedrich (Thematic contemporary witness interviews with Arnold Friedrich), recorded on April 18, 2015 in Hof.
- Bundesstiftung zur Aufarbeitung der SED-Diktatur, Zeitzeugenprofil – Arnold Friedrich (Contemporary witness profile – Arnold Friedrich),
- Mitteldeutscher Rundfunk, Reportage: Heute im Osten – Leben hinter Stacheldraht (Today in the East – Life Behind Barbed Wire), broadcast May 2014. Report on "Little Berlin" featuring footage from Mödlareuth and an interview with Arnold Friedrich.
- Mediendienst Ost, Heimat hinter Stacheldraht (Homeland Behind Barbed Wire), November 2014
- Agence France Press TV, Reportage: Das geteilte Dorf – Mauer trennte Mödlareuth (The Divided Village – A Wall Divided Mödlareuth), November 4, 2014.
- Bayerische Staatszeitung, Bayerisches "Little Berlin", (Bavarian "Little Berlin"), December 4, 2014.
- Nordbayerischer Kurier, Der Genosse und der Klassenfeind (The conrad and the capitalist enemy), November 11, 2019.
- Die Zeit, Ein Dorf, zwei Welten (One village, two worlds), June 10, 2025
- Süddeutsche Zeitung, Das deutsch-deutsche Dorf (The Germnan-German Village), November 8, 2024.
- Bundespräsident Steinmeier, Rede anlässlich der Einweihung des Neubaus des Deutsch-Deutschen Museums Mödlareuth (Keynote by German President Steinmeier on the Occasion of the Inauguration of the New Building of the German-German Museum Mödlareuth), October 2, 2025.
