= Trogen =

Trogen may refer to:

== People ==
- Karl-Erling Trogen (born 1946)

== Places ==
- Trogen, Switzerland
  - Trogen railway station, a station of Appenzell Railways in Trogen
- Trogen, Bavaria
