= Issigbach =

River in Germany

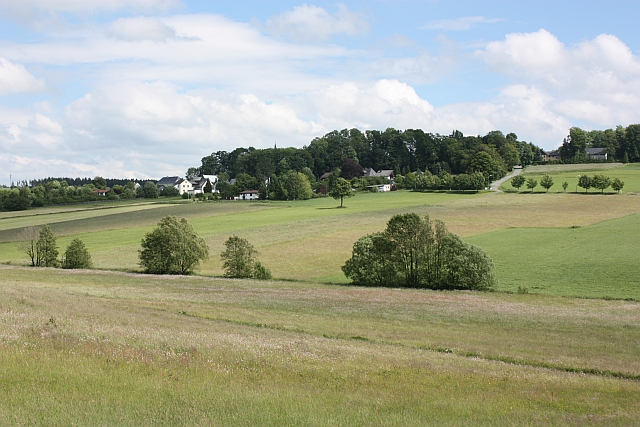
- The Issibbach nearby Reitzenstein, a little village that belongs to Issigau

Location
- Country: Germany
- State: Bavaria

Physical characteristics
- Mouth
  - location: Selbitz
  - coordinates: 50.3675°N 11.6914°E
- Length: 8.6 km (5.3 mi)

Basin features
- Progression: Selbitz→ Saale→ Elbe→ North Sea

Issigbach is a river of Bavaria, Germany. It passes through Issigau, and flows into the Selbitz near Lichtenberg.

== See also ==
- List of rivers of Bavaria
