= Thüringische Muschwitz =

River in Germany

Location
- Country: Germany
- States: Bavaria and Thuringia

Physical characteristics
- Mouth
  - location: Selbitz
  - coordinates: 50.3948°N 11.6913°E
- Length: 10.1 km (6.3 mi)

Basin features
- Progression: Selbitz→ Saale→ Elbe→ North Sea

Thüringische Muschwitz (also: Moschwitz) is a river on the border of Bavaria and Thuringia, Germany. It flows into the Selbitz near Lichtenberg.

On the side of Thuringia, in Saale-Orla-Kreis (municipalities of Schlegel, Harra, and Blankenstein), a nature protected area, Thüringische Muschwitz mit Grenzstreifen, has been opened. The area is 59 hectares (150 acres).

== See also ==
- List of rivers of Bavaria
- List of rivers of Thuringia
