= Naila =

- Town
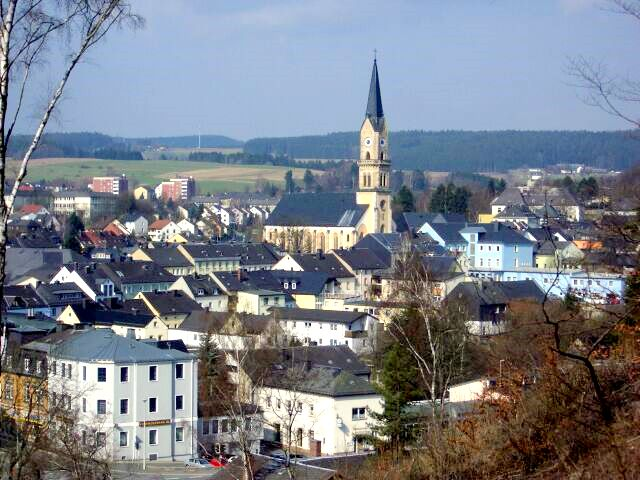
- Naila

- Coat of arms

- Location of Naila within Hof district
- Interactive map of Naila
- Location within Germany Location within Bavaria
- Coordinates: 50°19′N 11°41′E
- Country: Germany
- State: Bavaria
- Admin. region: Oberfranken
- District: Hof

Government
  - Mayor (2020–26): Frank Stumpf (FW)

Area
  - Total: 37.04 km^{2} (14.30 sq mi)
- Elevation: 512 m (1,680 ft)

Population (2025-12-31)
  - Total: 7,486
  - Density: 202.1/km^{2} (523.5/sq mi)
- Time zone: UTC+01:00 (CET)
  - Summer (DST): UTC+02:00 (CEST)
- Postal codes: 95119
- Dialling codes: 09282
- Vehicle registration: HO, NAI
- Website: www.naila.de

Naila (German pronunciation: [ˈnaɪlaː]) is a town located in the Hof district of Bavaria, Germany. It lies in the Franconian Forest. Naila is 18 km (11 mi) from the larger city of Hof, on both banks of the Selbitz river.

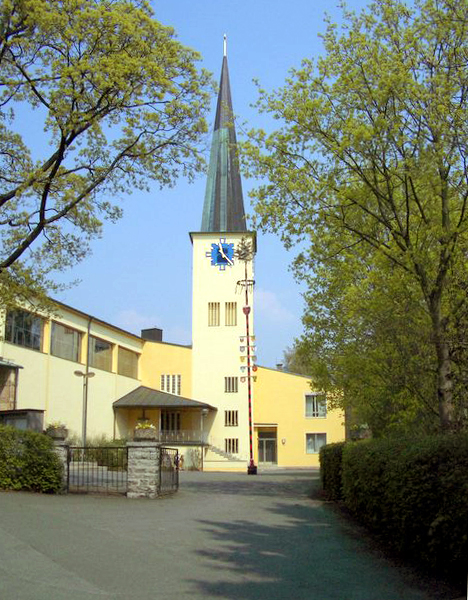
Naila: The Church of the Transfiguration

== History ==
The earliest documentation of Naila was recorded on 9 January 1343. The first settlements in the area around Naila probably happened between the 12th and 14th century. The name Naila first appeared as "Neulins" (and variations thereof), has its origins most likely in the meaning "Small new settlement". In 1454, Naila was awarded a coat of arms by its overlord, Margrave John.

After a brief episode under Prussian reign (1792–1810), Naila was included into the newly-established Kingdom of Bavaria. In 1818, it was awarded town privileges and in 1886, a railroad station was opened in Naila. However, after World War II, the establishment of Iron Curtain just 8 km (5.0 mi) north of Naila, cut off a large part of the market for the local industries.

The town served as the seat of the then district of Naila until this was merged into Hof district in 1972, and had to give up their number-plate code NAI in favour of HO. In 1978, the nearby villages of Marxgrün, Lippertsgrün and Marlesreuth were incorporated to Naila.

In 1979, Naila was the landing site of the Strelzyk and Wetzel families' famous homemade hot-air balloon escape from East Germany.

== Mayors ==
- 1906–1919: Wilhelm Hagen
- 1919–1926: Heinrich Kanzler
- 1926–1933: Julius Borger
- 1933-1933: Ludwig Wunner
- 1933–1945: Karl Jakob Schmidt
- 1945–1945: Georg Fugmann
- 1945–1948: Heinrich Lang senior
- 1948–1952: Christian Schlicht
- 1952–1953: Georg Fugmann
- 1953–1956: Karl Otto Zander
- 1956–1959: Hilmar Jahn
- 1960–1964: Fritz Jahn
- 1964–1968: Hans Künzel
- 1968–1972: Albin Bischoff
- 1972–1996: Robert Strobel
- 1996–2001: Hannsjürgen Lommer
- 2001- : Frank Stumpf

== Population development ==
The numbers are with the incorporated districts.

Year	Inhabitants
1840	4357
1871	4549
1900	5201
1925	6336
1939	6955

Year	Inhabitants
1950	10090
1956	9668
1960	9522
1965	9829
1970	9821

Year	Inhabitants
1975	9631
1980	9217
1985	8675
1990	8893
1995	9037

Year	Inhabitants
2000	8547
2005	8410
2010	8071
2015	7640

== Personalities ==
- Emre Dönmez (born 1996), screenwriter, photographer and movie critic
- Hans-Peter Friedrich (born 1957), jurist, CSU politician, Member of Bundestag since 1998, Federal Ministry of the Interior 2011-2013

== See also ==
- Franconian Forest
- Wild man
- Höllental
