= Little Berlin =

Little Berlin (Klein Berlin) is a name given in reference to the German capital city Berlin, to describe:

- Bydgoszcz, Poland, known in German as Bromberg, architecturally rich city, with gothic, neo-gothic, neo-baroque, neoclassicist, modernist and Art Nouveau styles
- Mödlareuth, a village situated in the German states of Bavaria (formerly West Germany) and Thuringia (formerly East Germany), divided by a wall like Berlin until 1989
- Williamsburg, Brooklyn, New York City, a neighbourhood renowned for its cultural and art scene and nightlife
