= Leupoldsgrün =

- Municipality
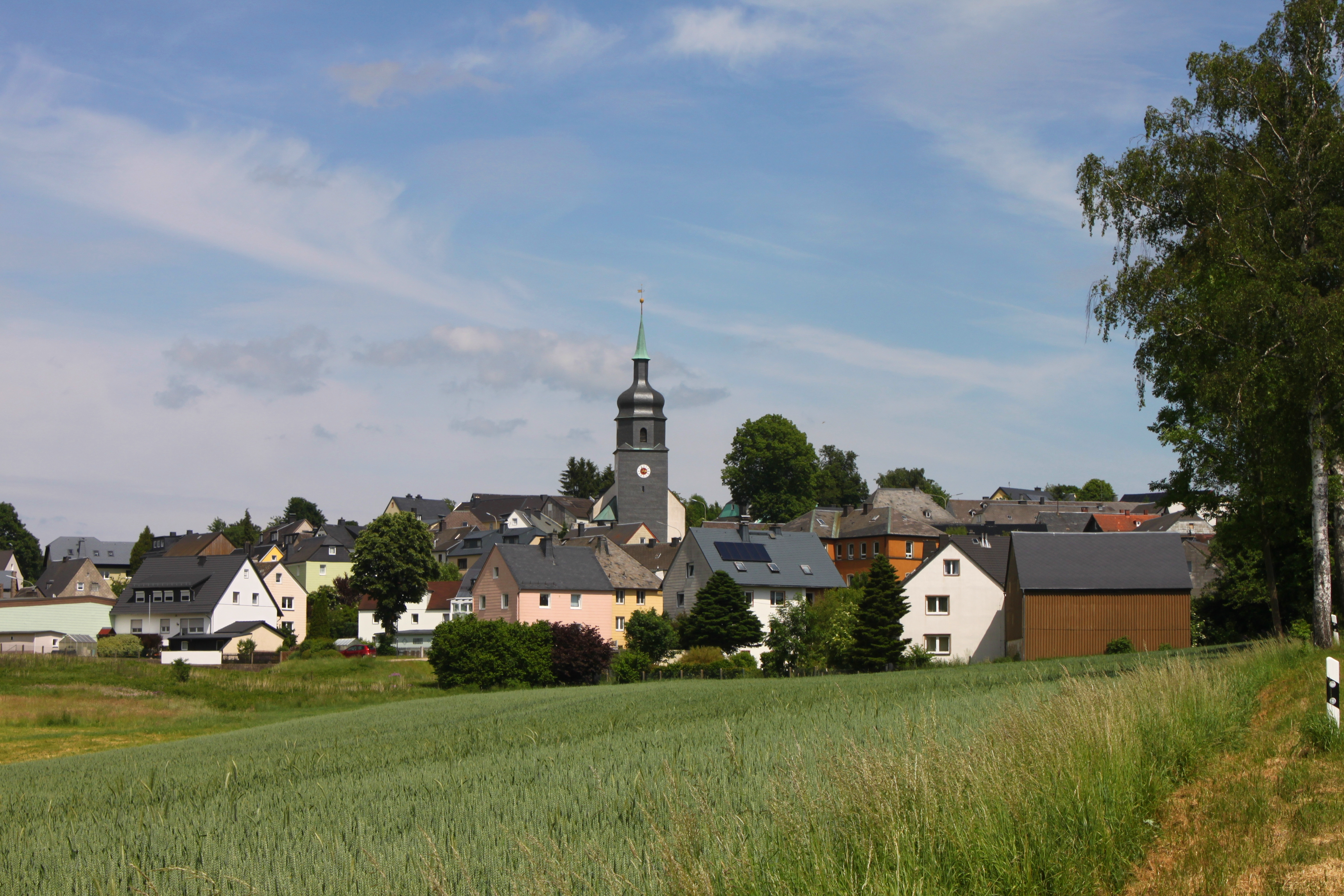
- Leupoldsgrün seen from the west

- Coat of arms

- Location of Leupoldsgrün within Hof district
- Interactive map of Leupoldsgrün
- Location within Germany Location within Bavaria
- Coordinates: 50°17′N 11°48′E
- Country: Germany
- State: Bavaria
- Admin. region: Oberfranken
- District: Hof
- Municipal assoc.: Schauenstein
- Subdivisions: 6 Ortsteile

Government
  - Mayor (2020–26): Annika Popp (CSU)

Area
  - Total: 10.26 km^{2} (3.96 sq mi)
- Elevation: 590–630 m (1,940–2,070 ft)

Population (2025-12-31)
  - Total: 1,235
  - Density: 120.4/km^{2} (311.8/sq mi)
- Time zone: UTC+01:00 (CET)
  - Summer (DST): UTC+02:00 (CEST)
- Postal codes: 95191
- Dialling codes: 09292
- Vehicle registration: HO
- Website: www.leupoldsgruen.de

Leupoldsgrün is a municipality in Upper Franconia. It can be found in the district of Hof, which is part of Bavaria, Germany.

In 2014 the 26-year-old Annika Popp (CSU) was elected mayor of the town, thus becoming the youngest mayor in Bavaria. She was re-elected in 2020.
