= Gattendorf =

- Municipality
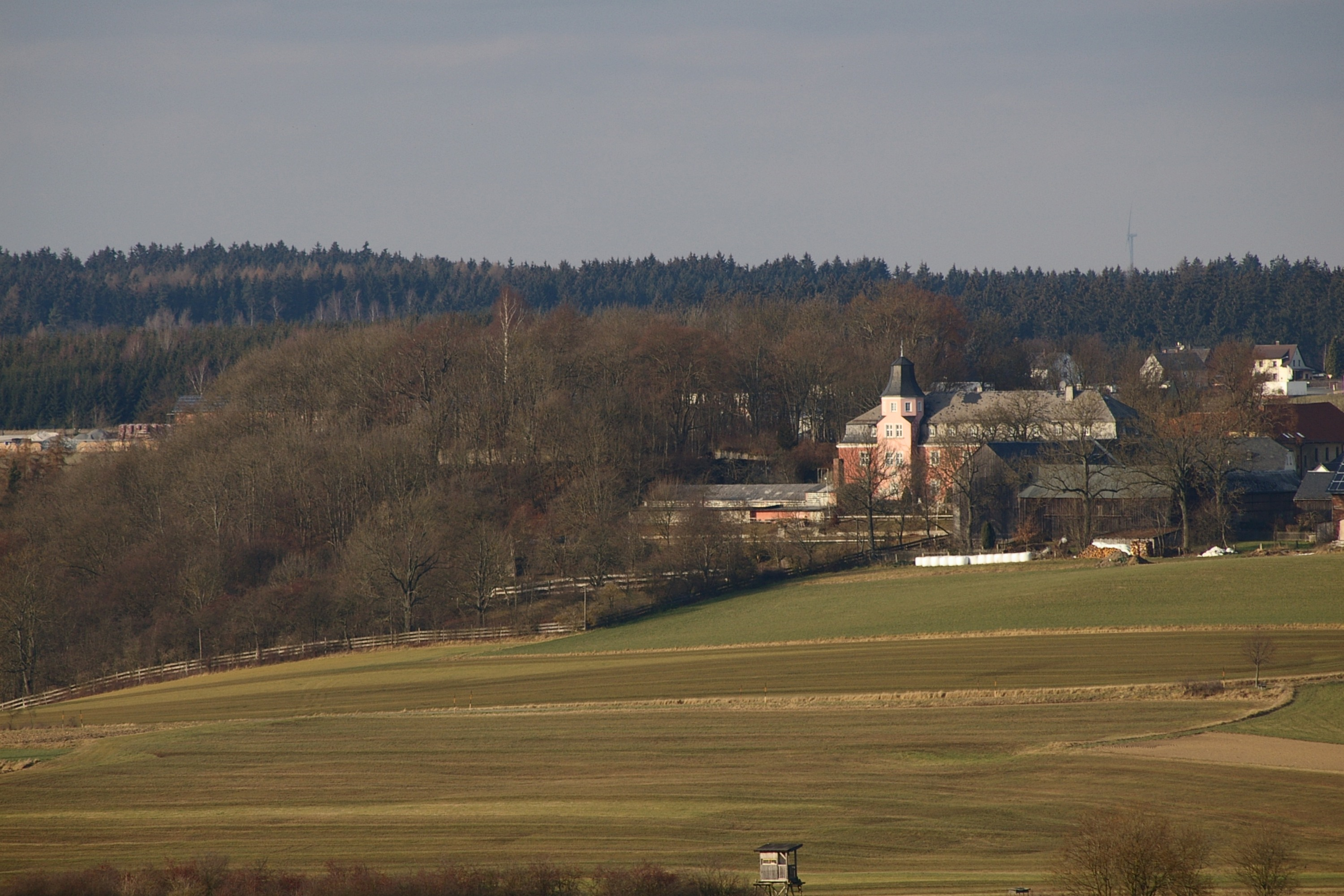
- Gattendorf Castle seen from the south

- Coat of arms

- Location of Gattendorf within Hof district
- Interactive map of Gattendorf
- Location within Germany Location within Bavaria
- Coordinates: 50°19′N 12°1′E
- Country: Germany
- State: Bavaria
- Admin. region: Oberfranken
- District: Hof
- Municipal assoc.: Feilitzsch
- Subdivisions: 15 Ortsteile

Government
  - Mayor (2020–26): Stefan Müller (CSU)

Area
  - Total: 22.19 km^{2} (8.57 sq mi)
- Elevation: 544 m (1,785 ft)

Population (2025-12-31)
  - Total: 1,029
  - Density: 46.37/km^{2} (120.1/sq mi)
- Time zone: UTC+01:00 (CET)
  - Summer (DST): UTC+02:00 (CEST)
- Postal codes: 95185
- Dialling codes: 09281
- Vehicle registration: HO
- Website: www.gattendorf.de

Gattendorf (German pronunciation: [ˈɡatn̩dɔʁf]) is a municipality in Upper Franconia in the district of Hof in Bavaria, Germany.

Its distinctive swan coat-of-arms was adopted in 1974 following the extinction, in 1944, of the local noble family von Schmidt auf Altenstadt.
