= Lichtenberg (Verwaltungsgemeinschaft) =

- Verwaltungsgemeinschaft
- Location of Lichtenberg within Hof district
- Interactive map of Lichtenberg
- Location within Germany Location within Bavaria
- Coordinates: 50°23′N 11°41′E
- Country: Germany
- State: Bavaria
- Admin. region: Upper Franconia
- District: Hof
- Seat: Lichtenberg
- Subdivisions: 2 municipalities

Area
  - Total: 28.15 km^{2} (10.87 sq mi)

Population (2025-12-31)
  - Total: 1,903
  - Density: 67.60/km^{2} (175.1/sq mi)
- Time zone: UTC+01:00 (CET)
  - Summer (DST): UTC+02:00 (CEST)
- Website: www.vg-lichtenberg.de

Lichtenberg is a Verwaltungsgemeinschaft (municipal association) in the district of Hof in Bavaria, Germany. Its seat is in Lichtenberg.

It consists of the following municipalities:

1. Issigau
2. Lichtenberg
