= Trogen, Bavaria =

Trogen
- Municipality
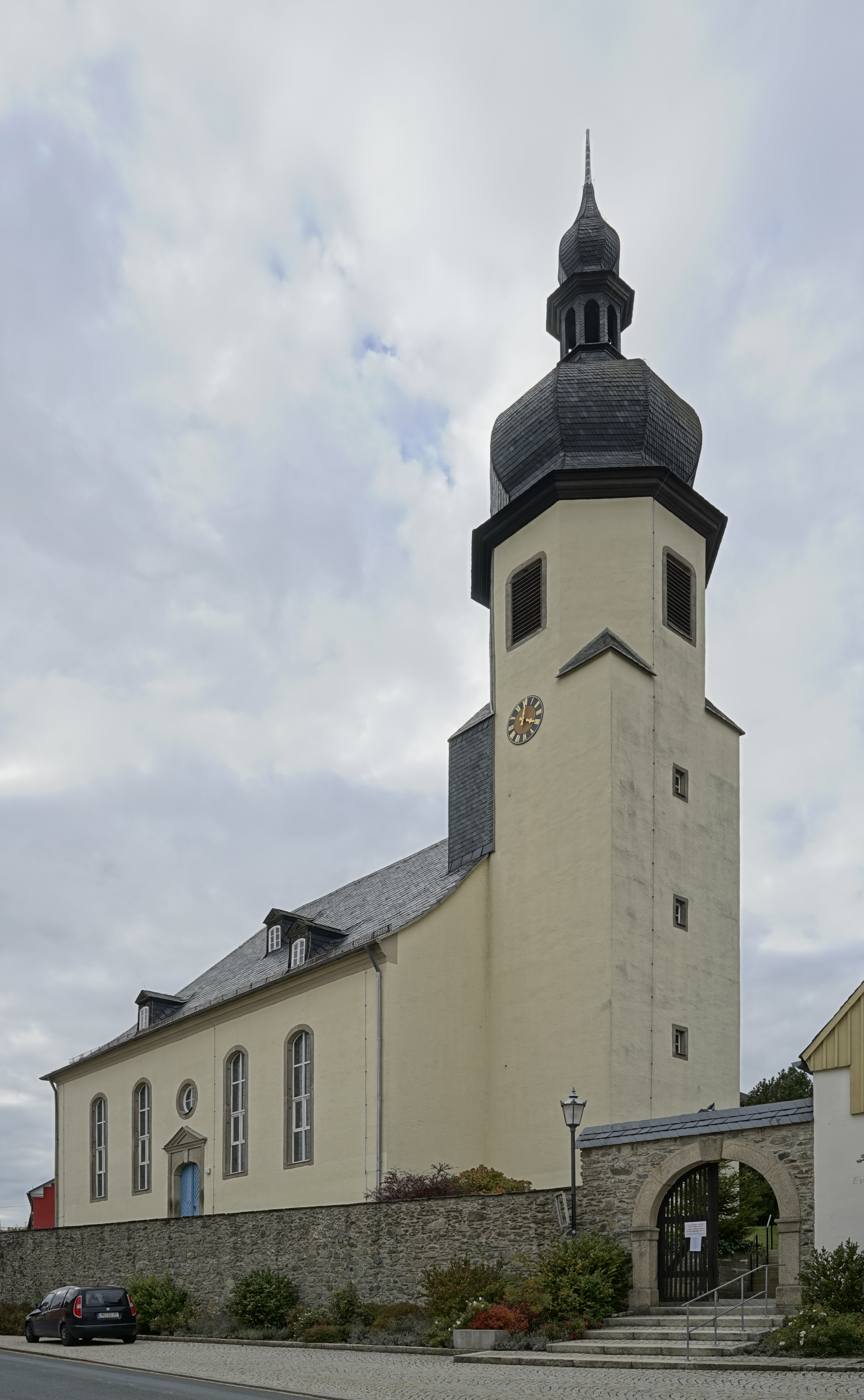
- Lutheran church in Trogen (2020)

- Coat of arms

- Location of Trogen within Hof district
- Interactive map of Trogen
- Location within Germany Location within Bavaria
- Coordinates: 50°22′N 11°56′E
- Country: Germany
- State: Bavaria
- Admin. region: Oberfranken
- District: Hof
- Municipal assoc.: Feilitzsch
- Subdivisions: 4 Ortsteile

Government
  - Mayor (2020–26): Sven Dietrich (CSU)

Area
  - Total: 12.32 km^{2} (4.76 sq mi)
- Elevation: 508 m (1,667 ft)

Population (2025-12-31)
  - Total: 1,367
  - Density: 111.0/km^{2} (287.4/sq mi)
- Time zone: UTC+01:00 (CET)
  - Summer (DST): UTC+02:00 (CEST)
- Postal codes: 95183
- Dialling codes: 09281
- Vehicle registration: HO, MÜB, NAI, REH
- Website: www.trogen.de

Trogen (German pronunciation: [ˈtʁoːɡn̩]) is a municipality in Upper Franconia in the district of Hof in Bavaria in Germany.

== Geography ==
Trogen is nestled between hills in a valley. The town is located about six kilometres northeast of the county seat Hof (Saale) on the Bundesautobahn 72 (junction 3 Hof / Töpen), and Bundesautobahn 93 (junction 2 Hof-East) and the federal highway B173. The community is located in the Bavarian part of Vogtland. It is part of the district of Hof and thus also of the administrative region of Upper Franconia (Oberfranken). The village Feilitzsch is only a few hundred metres away from Trogen.

== History ==
The first documentary mention of Trogen dates from 21 December 1306. The later Margrave of Kulmbach-Bayreuth were since 1373 rulers in Trogen. In Trogen were three knight seats (Wasserburg, Trogen-Zech, Oberes Gut) were in the possession of the Counts of Reuss (Imperial County of Reuss), the Margrave of Kulmbach-Bayreuth and Kursachsen (Electorate of Saxony). As a part of the 1792 Prussian Principality of Bayreuth Trogen fell in the Treaties of Tilsit in 1807 to France and came in 1810 to Bavaria. As part of the administrative reforms in Bavaria, the municipality of today was founded with the community edict of 1818.

== Sports ==
The towns association football club, 1. FC Trogen, experienced its greatest success in 2012 when it won promotion to the northern division of the Bayernliga but lasted for only one season at this level.

== Education ==
Trogen has since 1999 a Kindergarten with 100 seats for children.

== Volunteer fire department ==
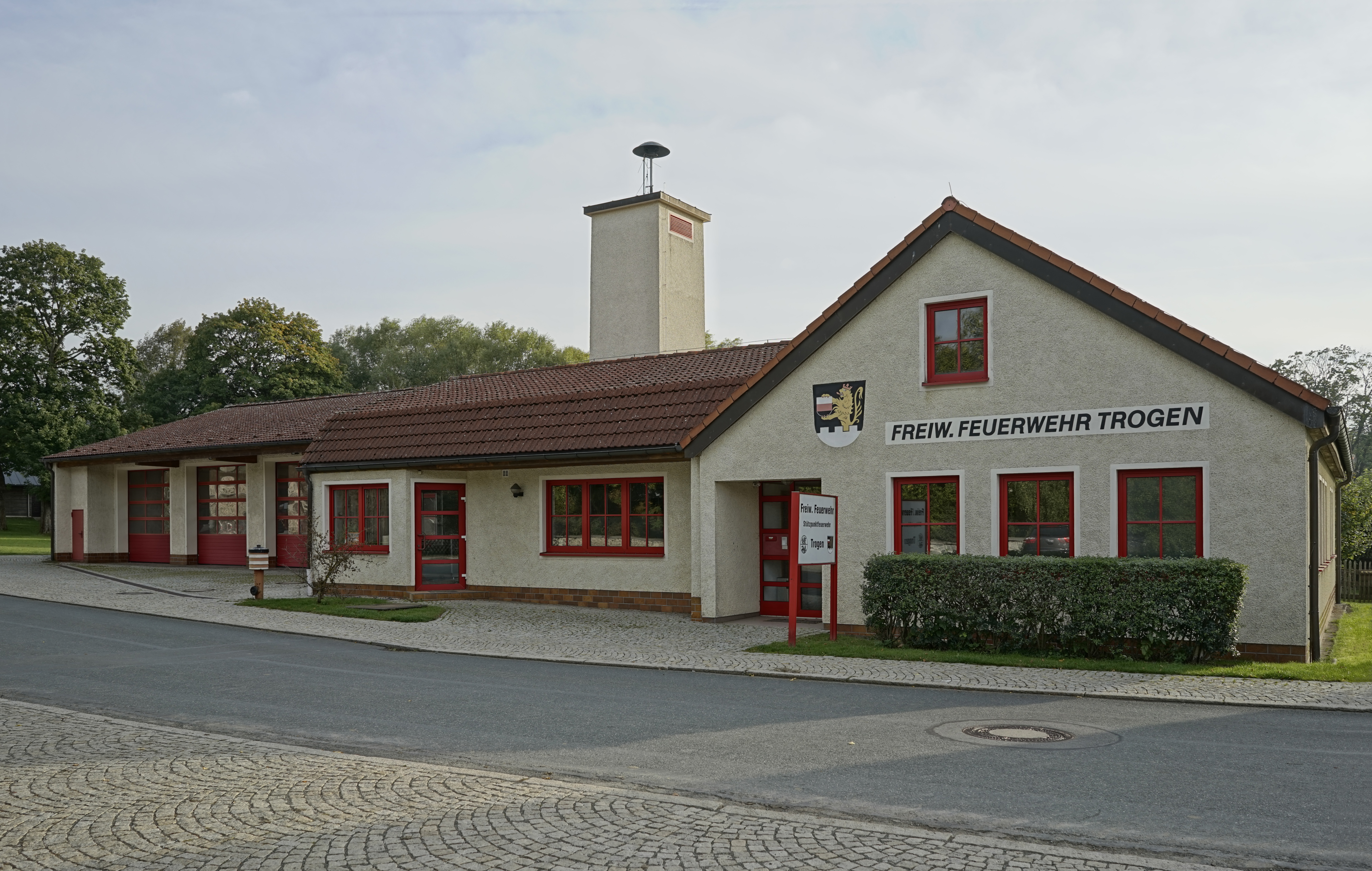
Volunteer firefighter department in Trogen (2020)

Trogen has its own volunteer firefighters. This department has 146 members, approx. 45 of them are active. 4 vehicles are held by this institution.

== Coat of arms ==
The Trogener Coat of Arms dates from 1979. Blazon: Above silver Zinnenschildfuß in black a growing red-armored and crowned golden lion holding in his forelegs a shield divided by silver, red and black. The three pinnacles symbolize the three knight seats (Wasserburg, Trogen-Zech, and Oberes Gut). The lion stands as a symbol of the former governors of Weida. The shield comes from the coat of arms of the barons of Feilitzsch.
