= Regnitzlosau =

- Municipality
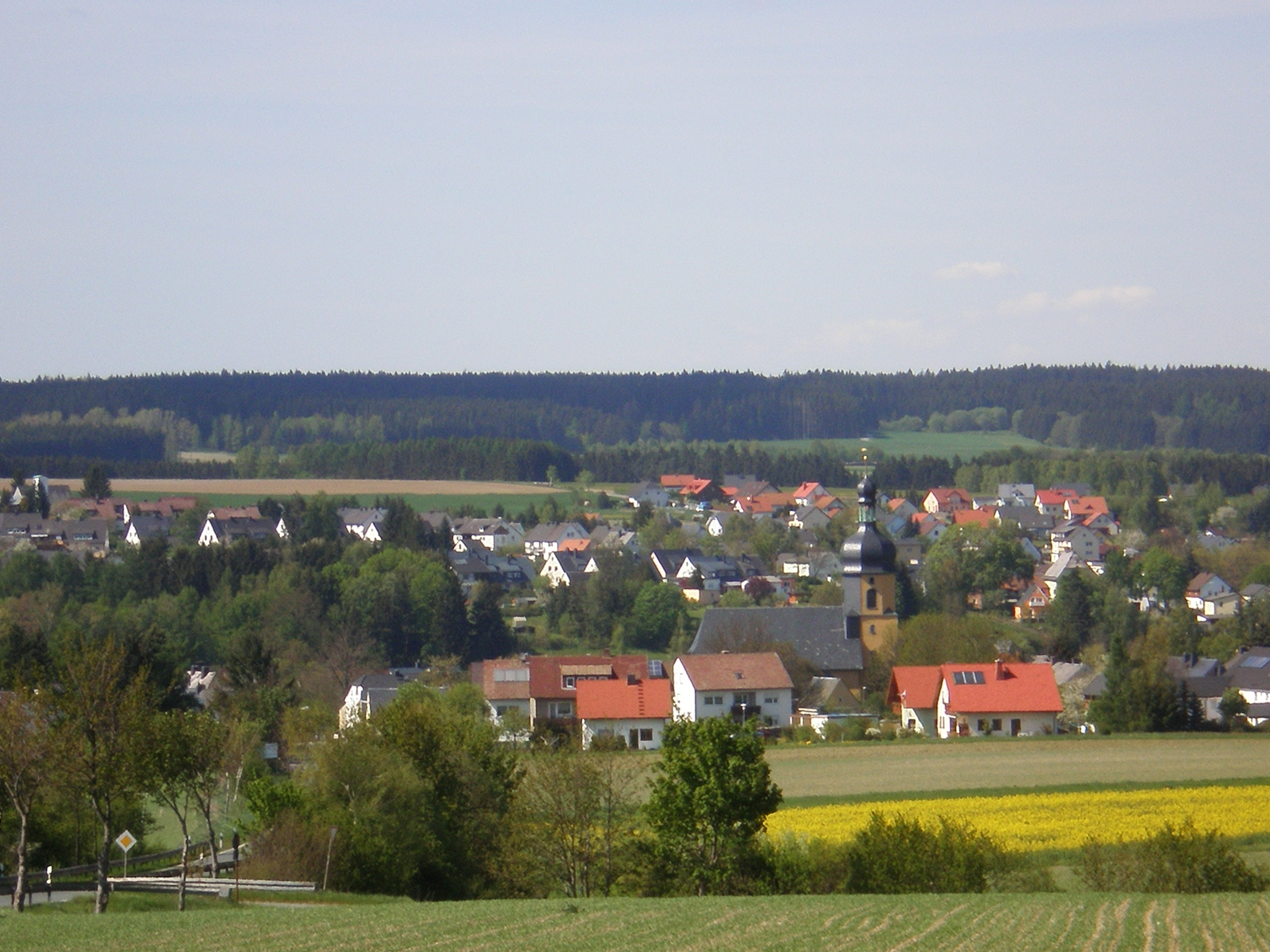
- Regnitzlosau seen from the south

- Coat of arms

- Location of Regnitzlosau within Hof district
- Interactive map of Regnitzlosau
- Location within Germany Location within Bavaria
- Coordinates: 50°17′N 12°03′E
- Country: Germany
- State: Bavaria
- Admin. region: Oberfranken
- District: Hof

Government
  - Mayor (2020–26): Jürgen Schnabel (FW)

Area
  - Total: 39.90 km^{2} (15.41 sq mi)
- Elevation: 495–602 m (1,624–1,975 ft)

Population (2025-12-31)
  - Total: 2,219
  - Density: 55.61/km^{2} (144.0/sq mi)
- Time zone: UTC+01:00 (CET)
  - Summer (DST): UTC+02:00 (CEST)
- Postal codes: 95194
- Dialling codes: 09294
- Vehicle registration: HO
- Website: www.regnitzlosau.de

Regnitzlosau is a municipality in Upper Franconia in the district of Hof in Bavaria in Germany, on the border with the Czech Republic. Regnitzlosau was established in 1234 by three members of the nobility: Cunradus de Lasan, Arnoldus de Lasan and Ciban de Lasan.
