= Höllental (Franconian Forest) =

Coordinates: 50.3928°N 11.6885°E

The Höllental (German pronunciation: [ˈhœlənˌtaːl], lit. 'Hell's Valley') in the Franconian Forest (Frankenwald) is nature reserve located in the Franconian region of Bavaria in southern Germany.

== Description ==
The Höllental is a protected nature reserve within the Franconian Forest. The Selbitz River runs through this narrow valley and, at the end, marks the border between the states of Bavaria and Thuringia. From the end of the Second World War until the reunification of Germany in 1989 the border here was closed. The Hölle Valley can be visited from Hof and Naila. On the western banks of the Selbitz is the Höllentalstraße, a private road that is closed to motor vehicles. It can however be used by cyclists and walkers. The valley has numerous walking trails. One of these paths, the Röhrensteig east of the Selbitz, follows the course of the pressurised water pipes of an old electricity station, that today still uses water from the Selbitz. It is dammed by a small weir. Points of interest include an outcrop of fossilised pillow lava (Kissenlava) on one of the steep sides of the walk and the dolerite rock.

There are several mineral springs near the village of Hölle at the entrance to the Hölle Valley. The mineral water from these springs is marketed under the name Höllensprudel.

The Marxgrün-Blankenstein railway, also known as the Hell Valley railway or Höllentalbahn, used to run through the valley.

The long-distance path, the Franconian Trail or Frankenweg also runs through the Höllental and intercepts the Rennsteig trail at the end of the valley near Blankenstein.

== Places of interest ==
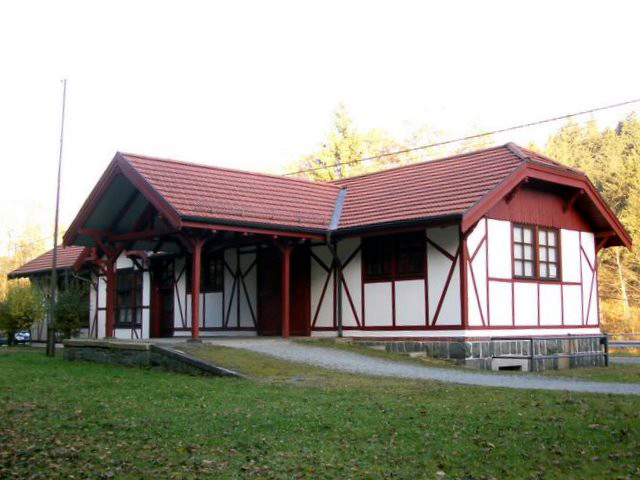
Nature reserve information centre at Lichtenberg station

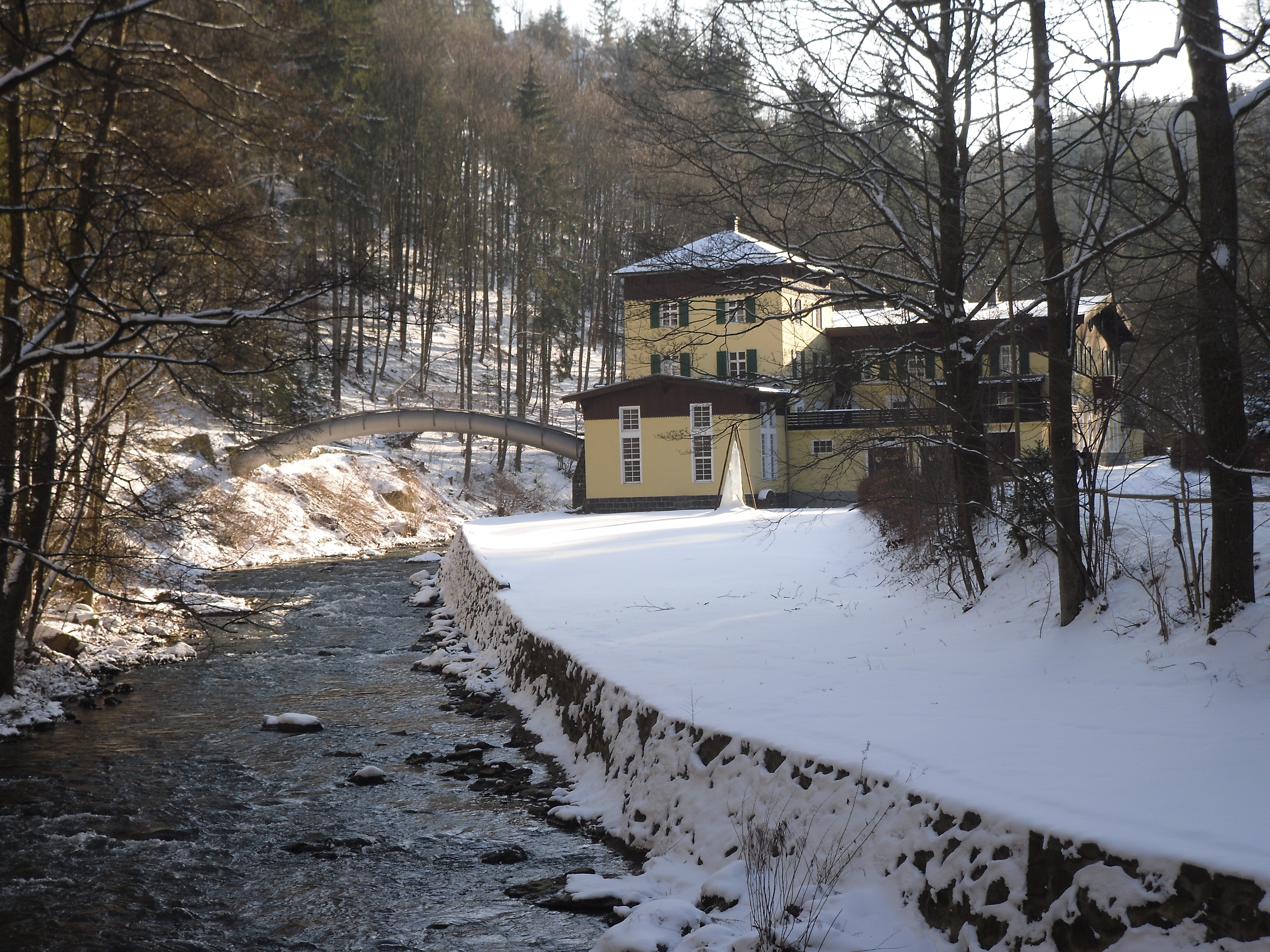
Hölle Valley power station

- Hirschsprung
- König David (King David) viewing platform
- Jungfernsteg footbridge
- Teufelssteg footbridge (demolished after being damaged by a falling tree)
- Electricity station with weir, Röhrensteig pipe walk, water tower, water fountains and operating building at Schweizerstil
- Railway bridge by the electricity station
- Nature reserve information centre at the exit to the valley at Lichtenberg station

== Mineral water ==
The mineral water sources are marketed by the firm of Kohlensäurewerk Hölle Dr. Fritz Wiede GmbH & Co.. Originally only the carbonic acid from the mineral water was given to breweries. Later the mineral water was bottled for consumption. The production of carbonic acid has since stopped and the manufacture of drinks has considerable expanded. Mineral water from the Hölle Valley is sold under various trade names e.g.

- Höllensprudel
- Eichensteiner Mineralwasser
- Vivre
- Deit

== Sources ==
- Herta Vogel: Das Höllental. 1989, Ackermann Verlag Hof; Heft 1 der Schriftenreihe FRANKENWALD – BAYERNS GRÜNE KRONE des Frankenwaldvereins e.V.
