= Konradsreuth =

- Municipality
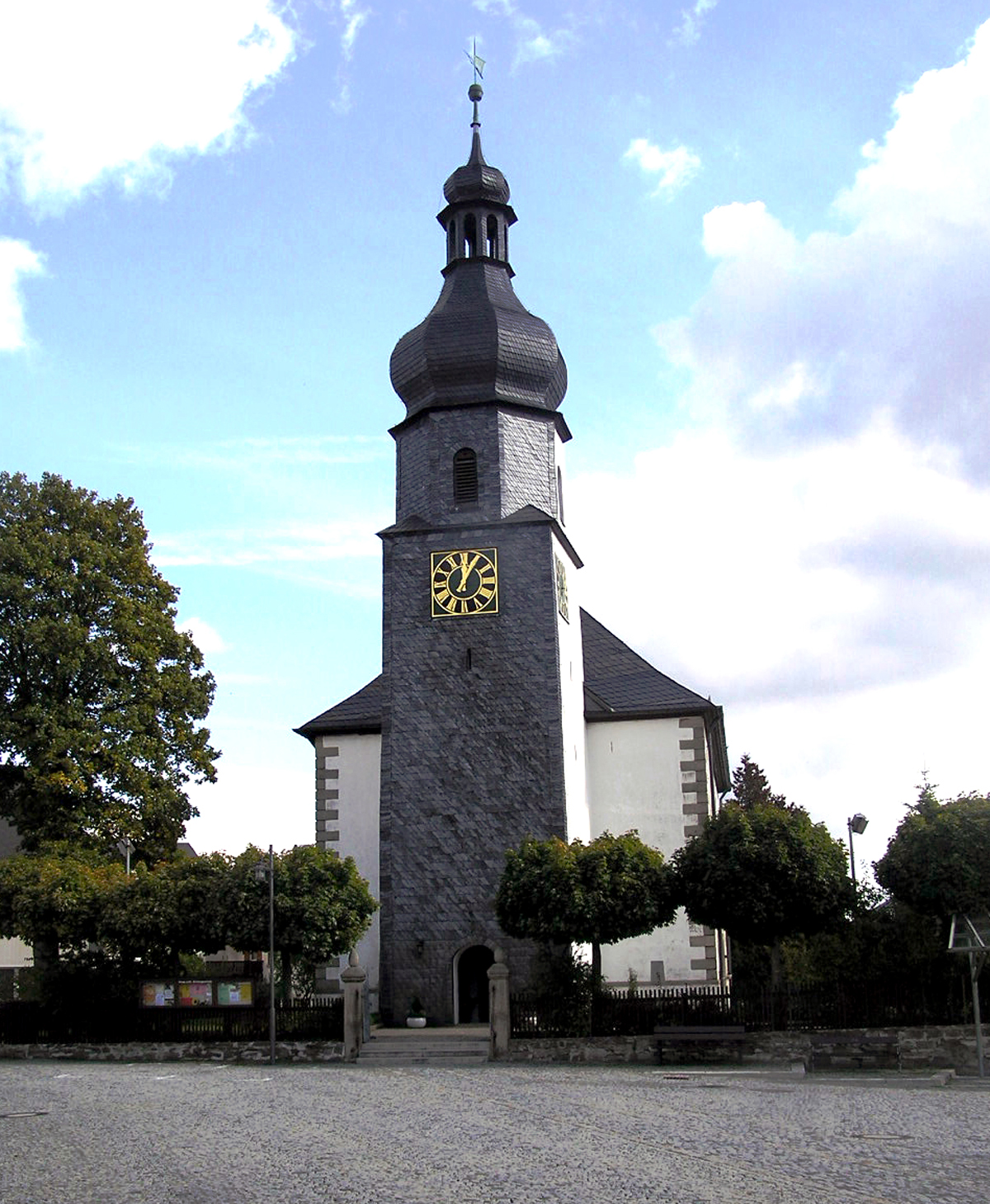
- Lutheran church

- Coat of arms

- Location of Konradsreuth within Hof district
- Interactive map of Konradsreuth
- Location within Germany Location within Bavaria
- Coordinates: 50°16′N 11°50′E
- Country: Germany
- State: Bavaria
- Admin. region: Oberfranken
- District: Hof

Government
  - Mayor (2020–26): Matthias Döhla (SPD)

Area
  - Total: 43.32 km^{2} (16.73 sq mi)
- Elevation: 552 m (1,811 ft)

Population (2025-12-31)
  - Total: 3,119
  - Density: 72.00/km^{2} (186.5/sq mi)
- Time zone: UTC+01:00 (CET)
  - Summer (DST): UTC+02:00 (CEST)
- Postal codes: 95176
- Dialling codes: 09292
- Vehicle registration: HO
- Website: www.konradsreuth.de

Konradsreuth is a municipality in Upper Franconia in the district of Hof in Bavaria in Germany.

== Geography ==
=== The districts ===
With the local government reorganization in 1972, the following villages were merged into Konradsreuth municipality:

Ahornberg	Berg	Birkenhof	Brand	Eckardsreuth	Engel
Frauenhof	Föhrenreuth	Glänzlamühle	Gläsel	Gottschalk	Hollareuth
Jägerhaus	Klausenhof	Konradsreuth	Lerchenberg	Martinsreuth	Maschinenhaus (Waldlust)
Modlitz	Neudörflein	Oberpferdt	Pretschenreuth	Reuthlas	Ringlasmühle
Schallershof	Schallersreuth	Schwarzenfurth	Schödelshöhe	Silberbach	Steinmühle
Stiftsgrün	Unterpferdt	Walburgisreuth	Weißlenreuth	Wendlershof	Wölbersbach
