= Feilitzsch (Verwaltungsgemeinschaft) =

- Verwaltungsgemeinschaft
- Location of Feilitzsch within Hof district
- Interactive map of Feilitzsch
- Location within Germany Location within Bavaria
- Coordinates: 50°22′N 11°56′E
- Country: Germany
- State: Bavaria
- Admin. region: Upper Franconia
- District: Hof
- Seat: Feilitzsch
- Subdivisions: 4 municipalities

Area
  - Total: 85.53 km^{2} (33.02 sq mi)

Population (2025-12-31)
  - Total: 6,101
  - Density: 71.33/km^{2} (184.7/sq mi)
- Time zone: UTC+01:00 (CET)
  - Summer (DST): UTC+02:00 (CEST)
- Website: www.vg-feilitzsch.de

Feilitzsch is a Verwaltungsgemeinschaft (municipal association) in the district of Hof in Bavaria, Germany. Its seat is in Feilitzsch.

It consists of the following municipalities:

1. Feilitzsch
2. Gattendorf
3. Töpen
4. Trogen
