= Töpen =

- Municipality
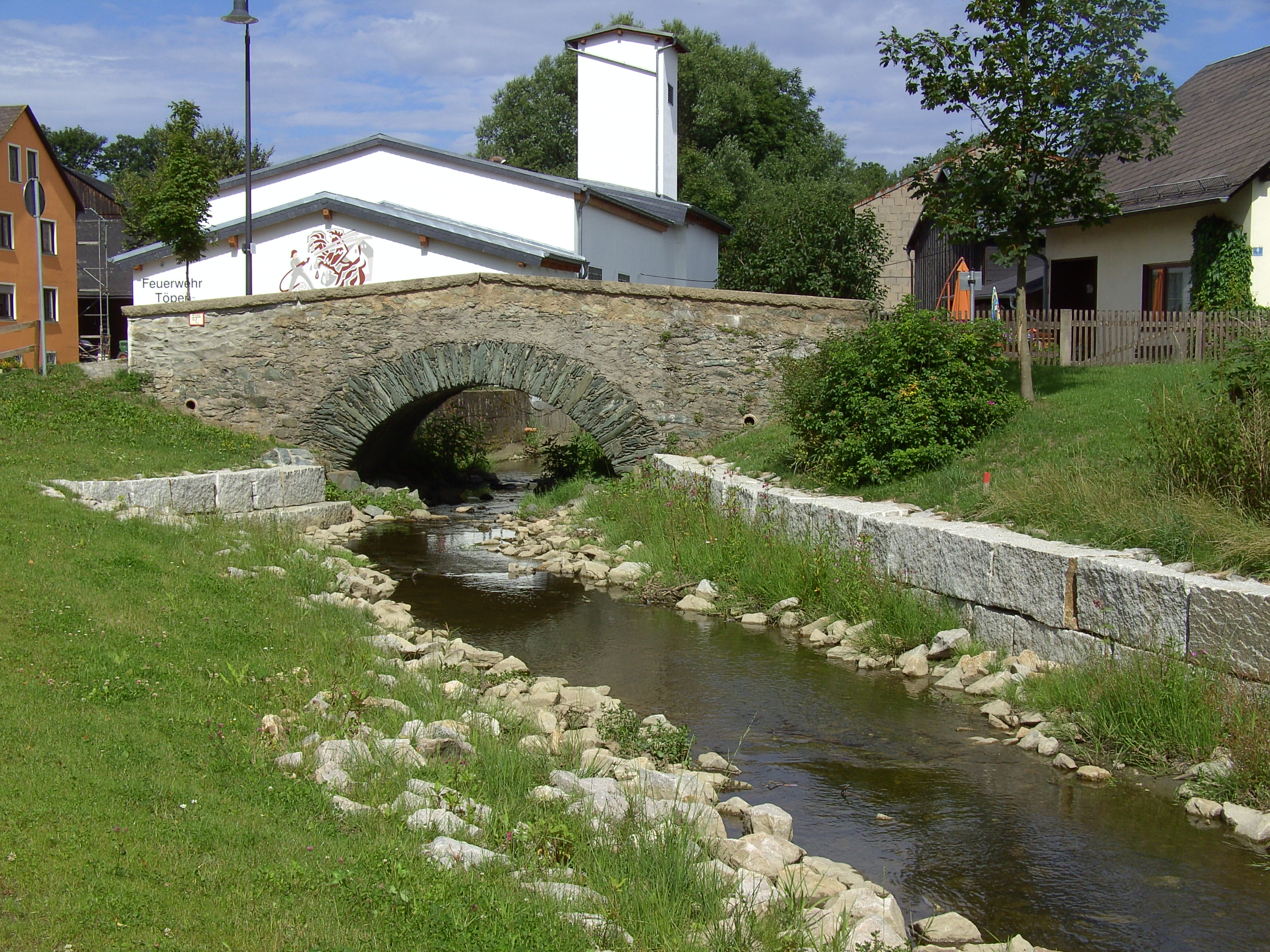
- Kupferbach in Töpen

- Coat of arms

- Location of Töpen within Hof district
- Interactive map of Töpen
- Location within Germany Location within Bavaria
- Coordinates: 50°23′25″N 11°52′19″E
- Country: Germany
- State: Bavaria
- Admin. region: Oberfranken
- District: Hof
- Municipal assoc.: Feilitzsch
- Subdivisions: 6 Ortsteile

Government
  - Mayor (2020–26): Alexander Kätzel (CSU)

Area
  - Total: 20.8 km^{2} (8.0 sq mi)
- Elevation: 516 m (1,693 ft)

Population (2025-12-31)
  - Total: 1,019
  - Density: 49.0/km^{2} (127/sq mi)
- Time zone: UTC+01:00 (CET)
  - Summer (DST): UTC+02:00 (CEST)
- Postal codes: 95183
- Dialling codes: 09295
- Vehicle registration: HO
- Website: Official website

Töpen (German pronunciation: [ˈtøːpn̩]) is a municipality in Upper Franconia in the district of Hof in Bavaria in Germany.

== History ==
Between 1945 and 1966 Töpen served as West German inner German border crossing for cars travelling between the Soviet Zone of occupation in Germany (till 1949, thereafter the East German Democratic Republic), or West Berlin and the American zone of occupation (till 1949) and thereafter the West German Federal Republic of Germany. The traffic was subject to the Interzonal traffic regulations, that between West Germany and West Berlin followed the special regulations of the Transit Agreement (1972). In 1966 the border crossing was closed in favour of a new crossing in Rudolphstein, a component of Berg in Upper Franconia.

== See also ==
- Mödlareuth

== Government ==
Since May 2020 First Mayor is Alexander Kätzel (CSU).

=== previous mayors ===
- Klaus Grünzner (CSU): May 2002 – April 2020
- Arnold Friedrich (FW): March 1979 – April 2002
- Hermann Schultz: May 1948 – December 1978
- Gottlieb Geißer: March 1948 – May 1948
- Martin Stumpf: ca. November 1945 – Februar 1946
- Erhard Friedrich: January 1930 – ca. November 1945
- Johann Köppel: January 1919 – December 1929
- Johann Klug: January 1900 – June 1919
- Schultz: January 1897 – December 1899

(Source:)
