= Schauenstein (Verwaltungsgemeinschaft) =

- Verwaltungsgemeinschaft
- Location of Schauenstein within Hof district
- Interactive map of Schauenstein
- Location within Germany Location within Bavaria
- Coordinates: 50°17′N 11°45′E
- Country: Germany
- State: Bavaria
- Admin. region: Upper Franconia
- District: Hof
- Seat: Schauenstein
- Subdivisions: 2 municipalities

Area
  - Total: 36.91 km^{2} (14.25 sq mi)

Population (2025-12-31)
  - Total: 3,065
  - Density: 83.04/km^{2} (215.1/sq mi)
- Time zone: UTC+01:00 (CET)
  - Summer (DST): UTC+02:00 (CEST)
- Website: www.schauenstein.de

Schauenstein is a Verwaltungsgemeinschaft (municipal association) in the district of Hof in Bavaria, Germany. Its seat is in Schauenstein.

It consists of the following municipalities:

1. Leupoldsgrün
2. Schauenstein
