= Sparneck =

- Municipality
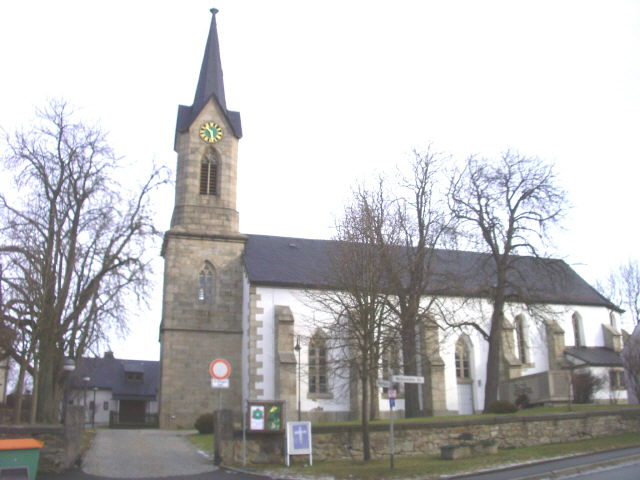
- Church of Saint Vitus

- Coat of arms

- Location of Sparneck within Hof district
- Interactive map of Sparneck
- Location within Germany Location within Bavaria
- Coordinates: 50°10′N 11°49′E
- Country: Germany
- State: Bavaria
- Admin. region: Oberfranken
- District: Hof
- Municipal assoc.: Sparneck
- Subdivisions: 9 Ortsteile

Government
  - Mayor (2020–26): Daniel Schreiner

Area
  - Total: 16.36 km^{2} (6.32 sq mi)
- Elevation: 560 m (1,840 ft)

Population (2025-12-31)
  - Total: 1,499
  - Density: 91.63/km^{2} (237.3/sq mi)
- Time zone: UTC+01:00 (CET)
  - Summer (DST): UTC+02:00 (CEST)
- Postal codes: 95234
- Dialling codes: 09251
- Vehicle registration: HO
- Website: www.sparneck.de

Sparneck (German pronunciation: [ˈʃpaʁnɛk]) is a municipality in Upper Franconia in the district of Hof in Bavaria in Germany.

== Location ==
The market town of Sparneck lies at an average height of 560 m above sea level (NN) in the Pfarrbach valley, which forms the larger part of the area. The Saxon Saale river flows through this valley in a northerly direction. Towards the east the 877 metre high Waldstein ridge rises, the source of the Saale is on its slopes. It forms the natural boundary with the neighbouring district of Wunsiedel.

== History ==
Sparneck is first mentioned 1223 with a person from Sparneck family.
