= Mödlareuth =

- Ortsteil of Töpen and Gefell
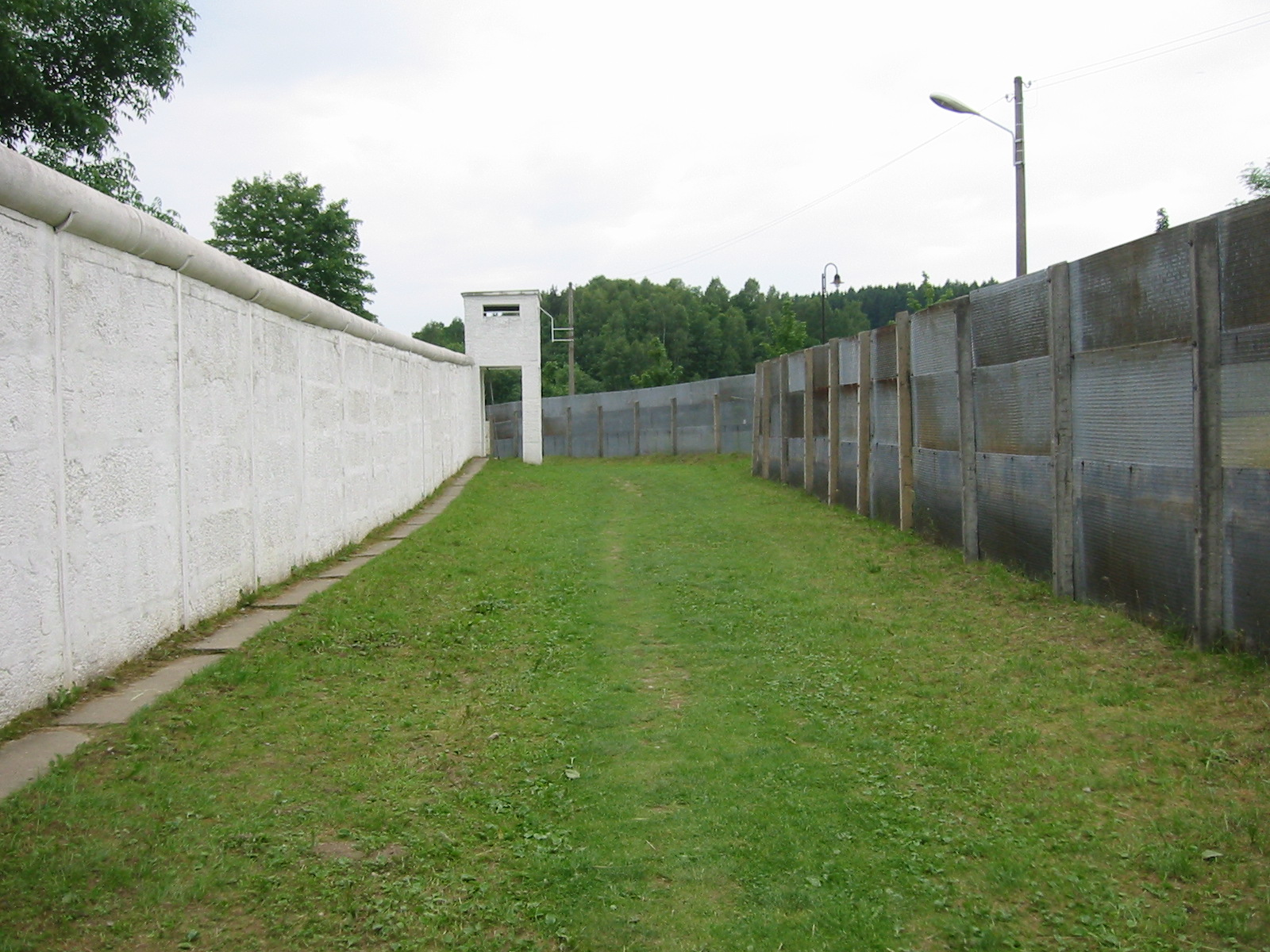
- The Mödlareuth wall today is part of an open-air museum
- Nickname: Little Berlin
- Location within Germany
- Coordinates: 50°24′54.16″N 11°52′59.06″E
- Country: Germany
- States: Bavaria; Thuringia
- Regierungsbezirke: Upper Franconia; none
- Districts: Hof; Saale-Orla-Kreis
- Municipalities: Töpen; Gefell
- Elevation: 543 m (1,781 ft)
- Time zone: CET/CEST (UTC+1/+2)
- Postal code: 95183; 07926
- Dialing code: (+49) 09295; (+49) 036649
- Vehicle registration: HO; SOK
- Website: Official website

Mödlareuth (German pronunciation: [ˈmøːdlaˌʁɔʏ̯t]) is a German village situated partly in Bavaria and partly in Thuringia. Between 1949 and 1990, the northern part was in East Germany and the southern part in West Germany.

The Thuringian part of the village belongs to Gefell while the Bavarian part belongs to Töpen. It was called "Little Berlin" by the Americans because a wall divided it until 1989, like the Berlin Wall divided Berlin. "Little Berlin" became a symbol of separation between the West and East by the wall, but also a symbol of reunification. Today the Museum Mödlareuth shows the history of the village and gives information about the political system at that time.

== History ==
=== Early history ===
In the year 1374 the village was mentioned for the first time in a document of the parish church of Gefell (original spelling: Modelotenreut). Mödlareuth shows up in an urbarium of 1502 that registers the fief ownership in the region. However, no further information is available, not even the detailed location is documented.

In 1810 (see Napoleonic Wars) the Tannbach stream (only around 30 cm; 1' wide), which flows through Mödlareuth, became the new border between the Kingdom of Bavaria and the principality of Reuss Junior Line. For 140 years this border made little difference to the local populace. There was just one school and one restaurant, both on the Reuss side, the villagers went to church in the neighboring Bavarian municipality Töpen.

=== Cold War ===
In 1945, Thuringia (to which Reuss had belonged since 1920) became part of the Soviet occupation zone, while Bavaria went to the American occupation zone. When the constitutions of West Germany and East Germany were ratified in 1949, the village became divided by the border between two states. A pass was required to cross between the two parts of town.

In 1952, East Germany began to strengthen its western border. Residents of areas close to the border were forced to relocate, including some residents of Mödlareuth. In the case of Mödlareuth a wooden fence almost two metres (6') high was built followed by more complex border fences. After the Berlin Wall was built in 1961, walls were built in other towns on the inner German border as well. The wall separating the two halves of Mödlareuth was built in 1966. From that point on, the East German part of the village was strictly monitored day and night, while on the West German side the wall became a kind of tourist attraction. The Americans nicknamed the place Little Berlin.

In 1983, the then U.S. Vice President George H. W. Bush visited and exclaimed, "Ich bin ein Mödlareuther!", an allusion to John F. Kennedy's "Ich bin ein Berliner" statement. Bush visited Mödlareuth together with the then Defense Minister of West Germany Manfred Wörner who later became the seventh Secretary General of NATO. Arnold Friedrich, the mayor of Töpen, a nearby village, was also present during the visit.

One month after the fall of the Berlin Wall (November 1989), a pedestrian crossing was opened at Mödlareuth (December 1989). On 17 June 1990, four months before German reunification, the Mödlareuth Wall was knocked down using a bulldozer. A portion has been retained as a memorial and is part of the museum in the village.

=== Mödlareuth today ===
The Thuringian part of the village of Mödlareuth belongs to the town of Gefell, and the Bavarian part to the community of Töpen.

Since 1994, Mödlareuth has had an open-air museum about the border between East and West Germany. It includes a portion of the original wall as well as a rebuilt barrier typical of those on the border at the time.

Although there is free passage between the two parts of the village today, there are still many differences. They have different postal codes and telephone area codes; the residents vote separately and send their children to different schools.

== Gallery ==
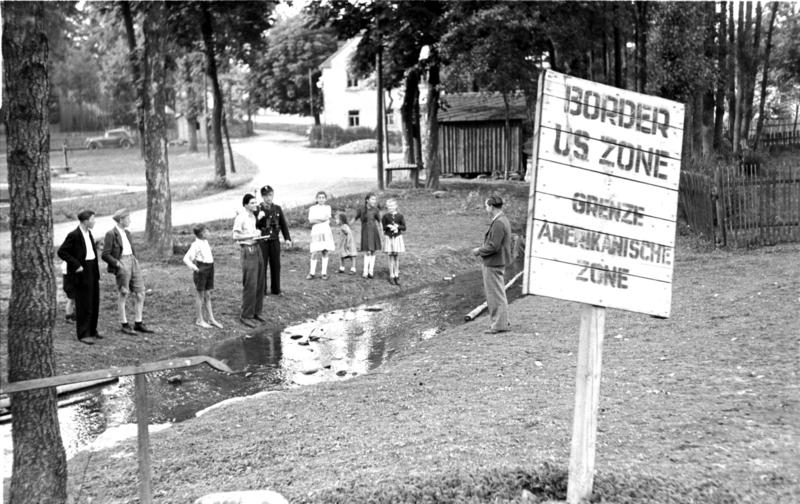
The Mödlareuth border in 1949

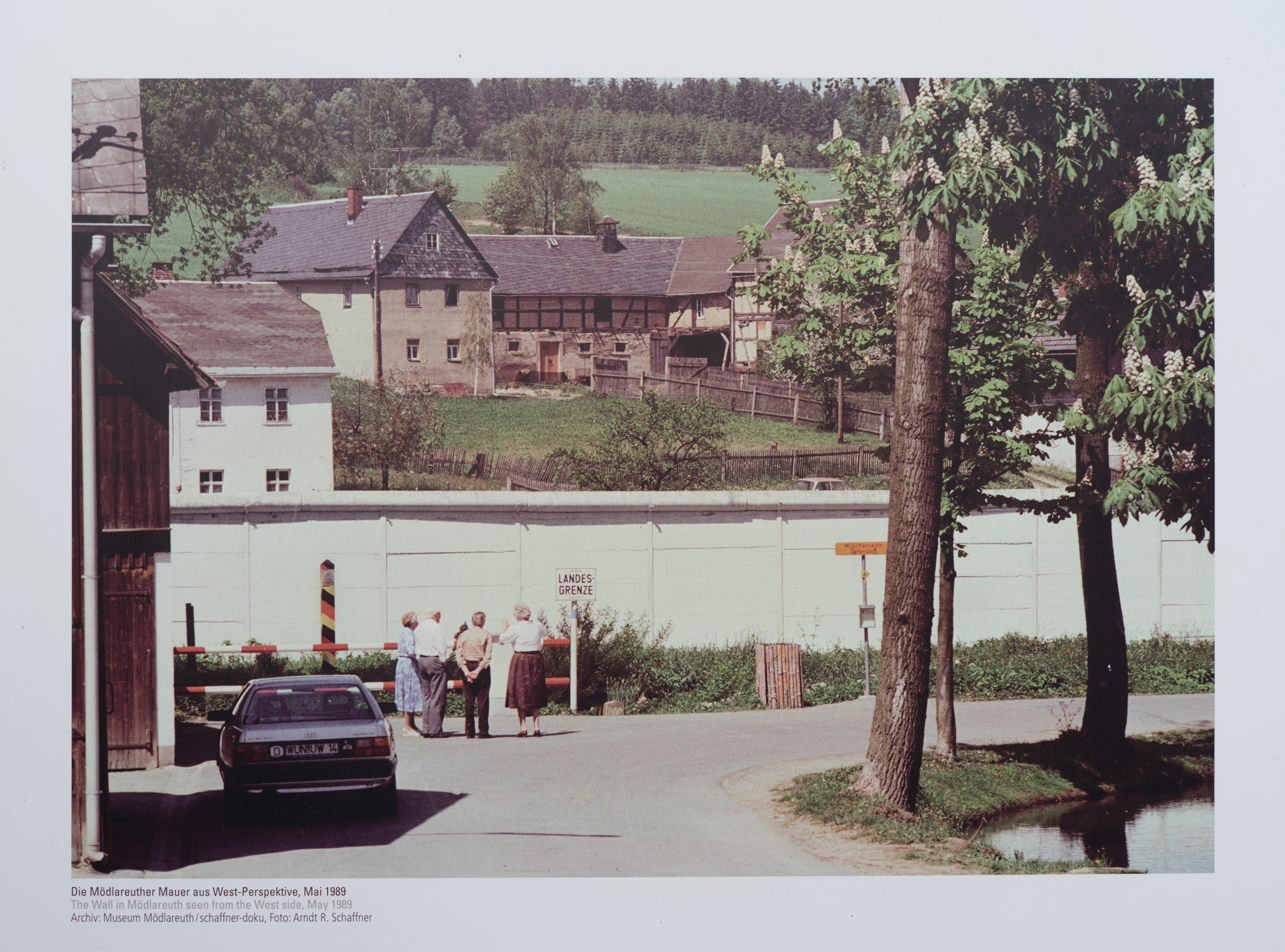
The Mödlareuth border in 1989

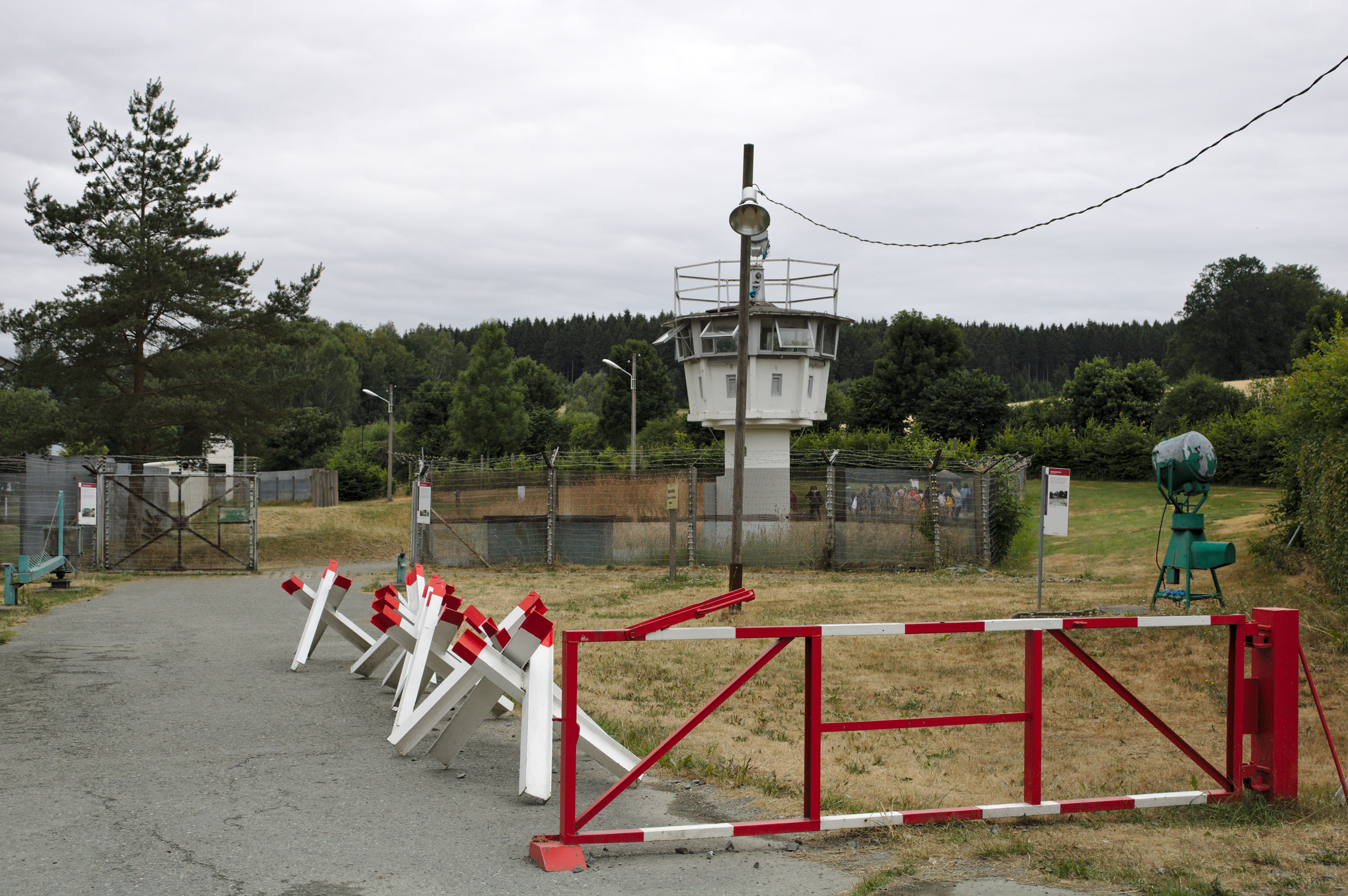
Open-air museum

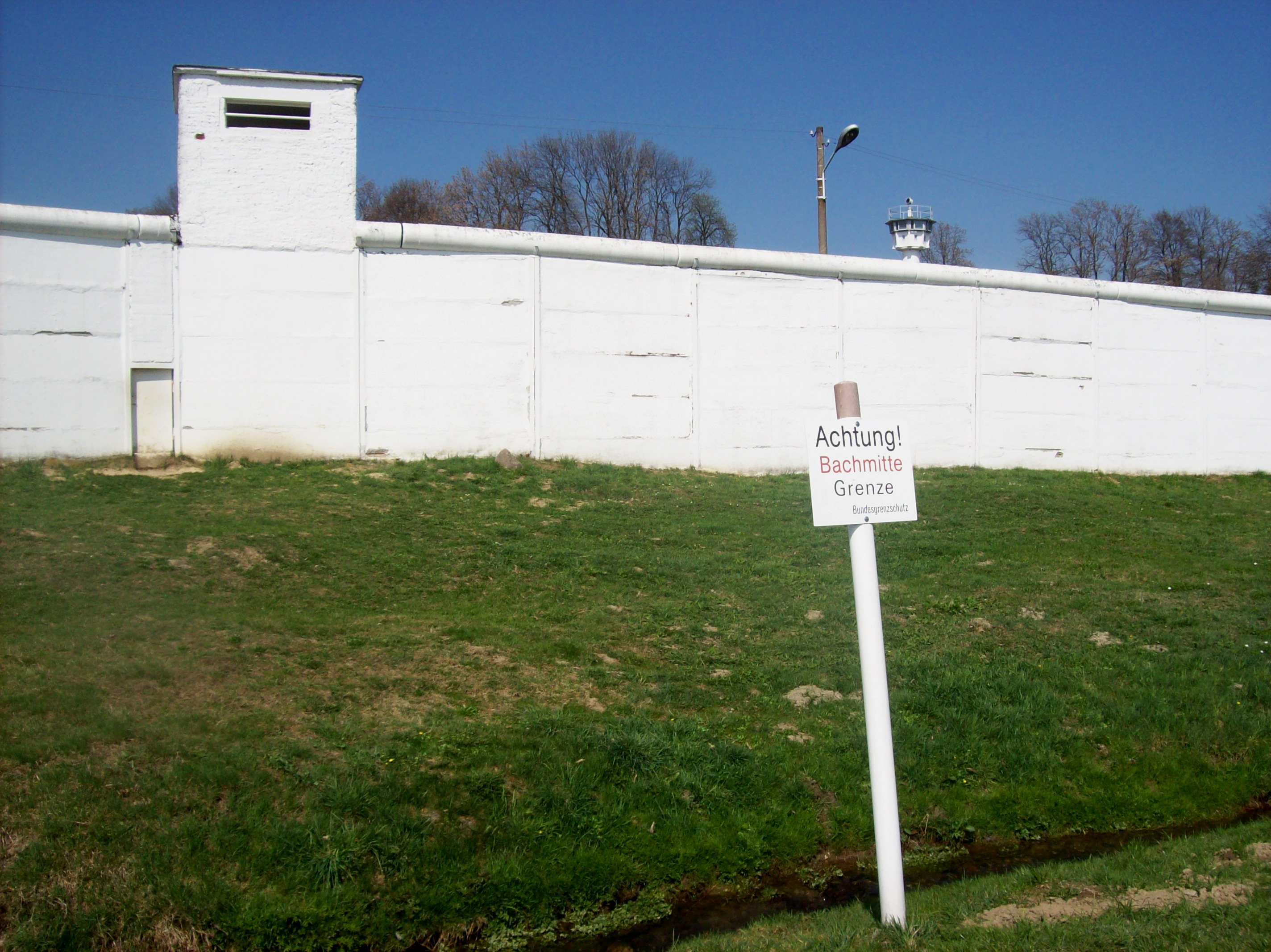
Mödlareuth Wall

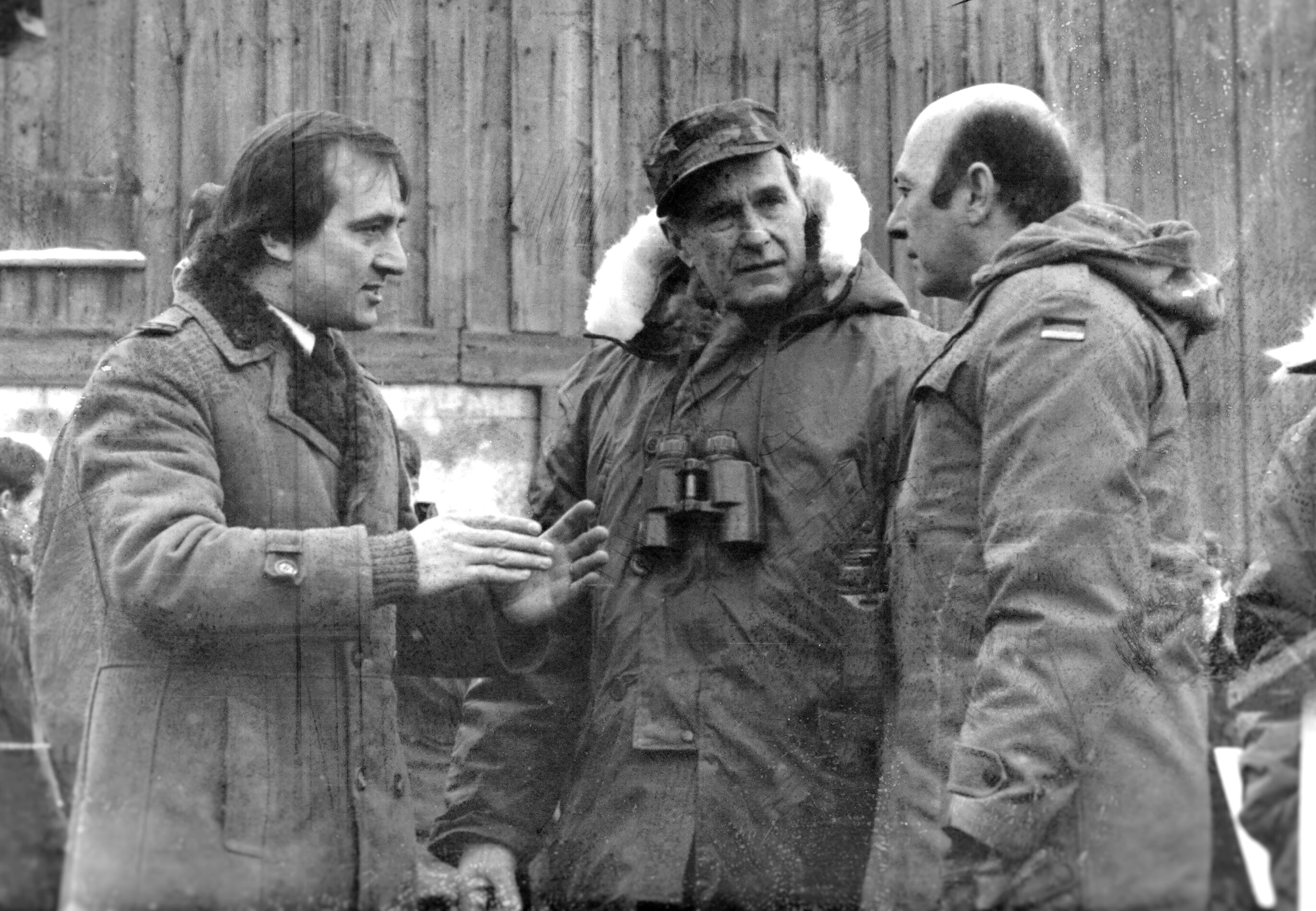
US Vice President George Bush visits "Little Berlin" on 5 February 1983. Left: Arnold Friedrich. Middle: George H.W. Bush. Right: Manfred Wörner.

== Films ==
- Sky Without Stars. Germany 1955. Directed by Helmut Käutner.
- Halt! Hier Grenze - Auf den Spuren der innerdeutschen Grenze. Documentary Film, Germany 2005.
- Mitten im wilden Deutschland. Andreas Kieling, Documentary Film, Germany 2009.
- Tannbach I – Schicksal eines Dorfes. History Film, Germany/Czech Republic 2014. Directed by Alexander Dierbach. First performance ZDF 4, 5 and 7 January 2015.
- Tannbach – Die Dokumentation. Documentary Film, Germany 2014. First performance ZDF 4 January 2015.
- Tannbach II. History-Film, Germany/Czech Republic 2017, Directed by Alexander Dierbach. First performance ZDF 8, 10 and 11 January 2018.
- World War III, a ZDF mockumentary directed by Robert Stone and narrated by David McCallum of an alternate history in which Gorbachev is deposed and his successor Soshkin blocks access to West Berlin.

== See also ==
- Inner German border

== Sources ==
- Jason Johnson: Divided Village: The Cold War in the German Borderlands. New York, Routledge, 2017.
- Wolfgang Kahl: Ersterwähnung Thüringer Städte und Dörfer. Ein Handbuch. Rockstuhl, Bad-Langensalza 2010, ISBN 978-3-86777-202-0.
- Ludger Stühlmeyer: Curia sonans. Die Musikgeschichte der Stadt Hof. Eine Studie zur Kultur Oberfrankens von der Gründung des Bistums Bamberg bis zur Gegenwart. Heinrichsverlag, Bamberg 2010, ISBN 978-3-89889-155-4 (phil. dissertation, Münster 2010).
