= Weißdorf =

- Municipality
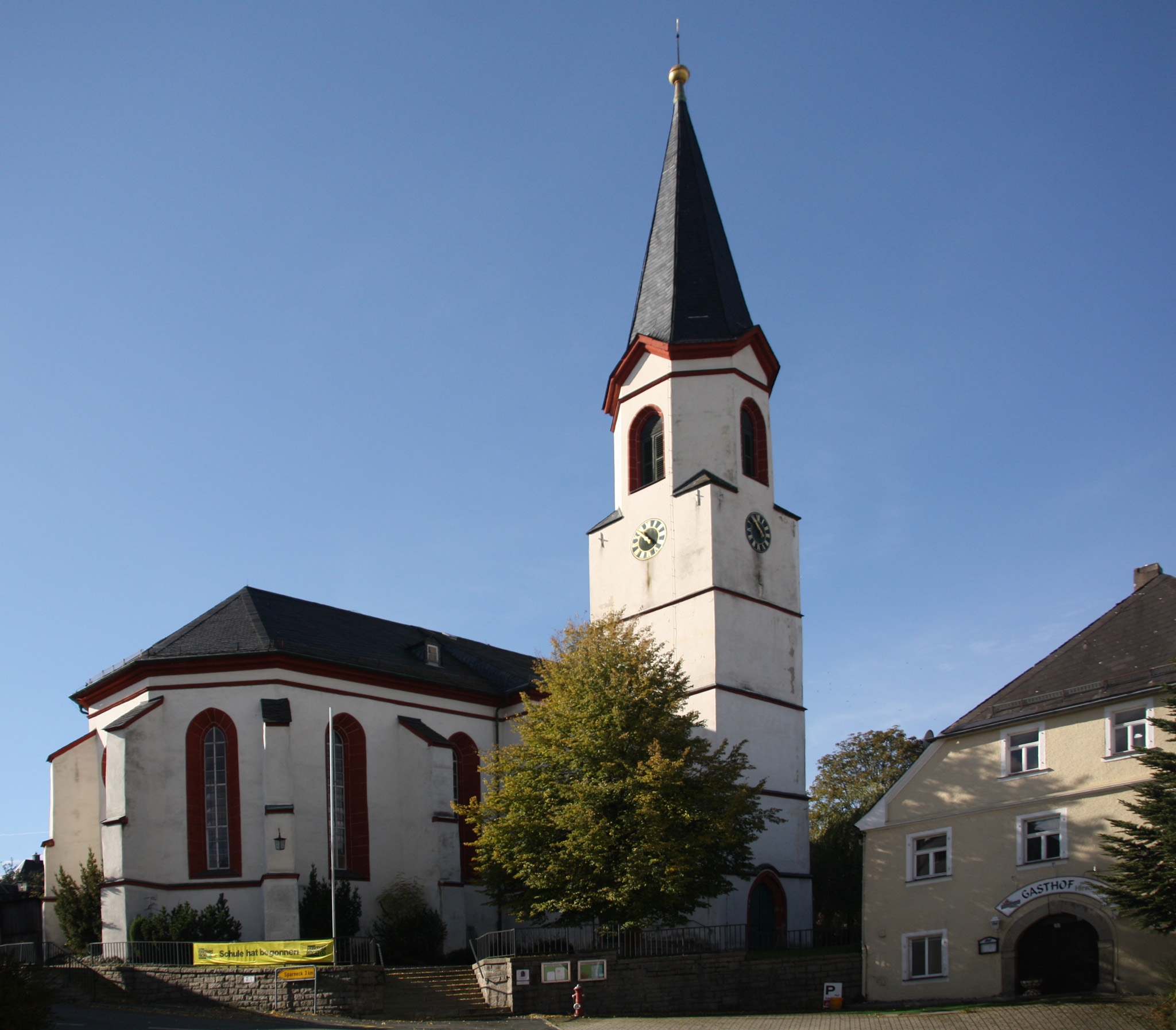
- Lutheran Church of Saint Mary

- Coat of arms

- Location of Weißdorf within Hof district
- Interactive map of Weißdorf
- Location within Germany Location within Bavaria
- Coordinates: 50°10′N 11°50′E
- Country: Germany
- State: Bavaria
- Admin. region: Oberfranken
- District: Hof
- Municipal assoc.: Sparneck
- Subdivisions: 7 Ortsteile

Government
  - Mayor (2020–26): Heiko Hain

Area
  - Total: 21.91 km^{2} (8.46 sq mi)
- Elevation: 532 m (1,745 ft)

Population (2025-12-31)
  - Total: 1,209
  - Density: 55.18/km^{2} (142.9/sq mi)
- Time zone: UTC+01:00 (CET)
  - Summer (DST): UTC+02:00 (CEST)
- Postal codes: 95237
- Dialling codes: 09251
- Vehicle registration: HO
- Website: www.weissdorf.de

Weißdorf (German pronunciation: [ˈvaɪsdɔʁf]) is a municipality in Upper Franconia in the district of Hof in Bavaria in Germany. It lies on the Saale River.
