= Sparneck (Verwaltungsgemeinschaft) =

- Verwaltungsgemeinschaft
- Location of Sparneck within Hof district
- Interactive map of Sparneck
- Location within Germany Location within Bavaria
- Coordinates: 50°10′N 11°50′E
- Country: Germany
- State: Bavaria
- Admin. region: Upper Franconia
- District: Hof
- Seat: Sparneck
- Subdivisions: 2 municipalities

Area
  - Total: 38.27 km^{2} (14.78 sq mi)

Population (2025-12-31)
  - Total: 2,708
  - Density: 70.76/km^{2} (183.3/sq mi)
- Time zone: UTC+01:00 (CET)
  - Summer (DST): UTC+02:00 (CEST)
- Website: www.vg-sparneck.de

Sparneck is a Verwaltungsgemeinschaft (municipal association) in the district of Hof in Bavaria, Germany. Its seat is in Sparneck.

It consists of the following municipalities:

1. Sparneck
2. Weißdorf
