= Karl-Erling Trogen =

Swedish company operator (born 1946)

Karl-Erling Trogen (born 1946) is a Swedish business executive. He was chairman of National Electric Vehicle Sweden AB (NEVS) from the foundation in April 2012 until January 2014. The NEVS bought the bankruptcy estate from Saab Automobile on June 13, 2012.

Trogen has a Master of Science degree from Chalmers University of Technology. He was active in the Volvo Group from 1971 to 2005, and CEO of Volvo Trucks from 1991 to 2000.
