= Hof (district) =

Coordinates: 50°15′N 11°50′E

- District
- Flag Coat of arms
- Country: Germany
- State: Bavaria
- Adm. region: Upper Franconia
- Capital: Hof

Government
  - District admin.: Oliver Bär (CSU)

Area
  - Total: 893 km^{2} (345 sq mi)

Population (31 December 2025)
  - Total: 91,582
  - Density: 103/km^{2} (266/sq mi)
- Time zone: UTC+01:00 (CET)
  - Summer (DST): UTC+02:00 (CEST)
- Vehicle registration: HO, MÜB, NAI, REH, SAN
- Website: landkreis-hof.de

Hof (German pronunciation: [hoːf]) is a Landkreis (district) in Bavaria, Germany. It is bounded by (from the south and clockwise) the districts of Wunsiedel, Bayreuth, Kulmbach and Kronach, the states of Thuringia (district of Saale-Orla) and Saxony (district of Vogtlandkreis), and the Czech Republic. The city of Hof is an enclave within the district, as well as being the district's administrative seat.

== History ==
Following a short regency by the Kingdom of Prussia (1791–1810) the region fell to Bavaria in 1810. The district was established in 1852. In the Bavarian communal reforms of 1972 it was merged with parts of the dissolved districts of Naila, Münchberg, Kronach and Rehau.

== Geography ==
The Saxon Saale river originates in the south of the district, on the slopes of the Fichtel Mountains. From here it runs northwards, its valley separating the Fichtel Mountains in the east and the lower Franconian Forest hills in the west.

== Coat of arms ==
The coat of arms displays two lions. They are from the arms of the counties of Weida and Nuremberg, who subsequently ruled over the region in the early Middle Ages.

== Towns and municipalities ==
Clickable map of towns and municipalities in the district

Towns
1. Helmbrechts
2. Münchberg
3. Naila
4. Rehau
5. Schwarzenbach am Wald
6. Schwarzenbach an der Saale
7. Selbitz
Märkte
1. Bad Steben
2. Oberkotzau
3. Stammbach
4. Zell im Fichtelgebirge
Municipalities
1. Berg
2. Döhlau
3. Geroldsgrün
4. Köditz
5. Konradsreuth
6. Regnitzlosau

Verwaltungsgemeinschaften
1. Feilitzsch; 1. Feilitzsch^{1}; 2. Gattendorf; 3. Töpen; 4. Trogen	2. Lichtenberg; 1. Issigau; 2. Lichtenberg^{1,2}	3. Schauenstein; 1. Leupoldsgrün; 2. Schauenstein^{1,2}	4. Sparneck; 1. Sparneck^{1,3}; 2. Weißdorf
^{1}seat of the Verwaltungsgemeinschaft; ^{2}town; ^{3}Markt
