= Issigau =

- Municipality
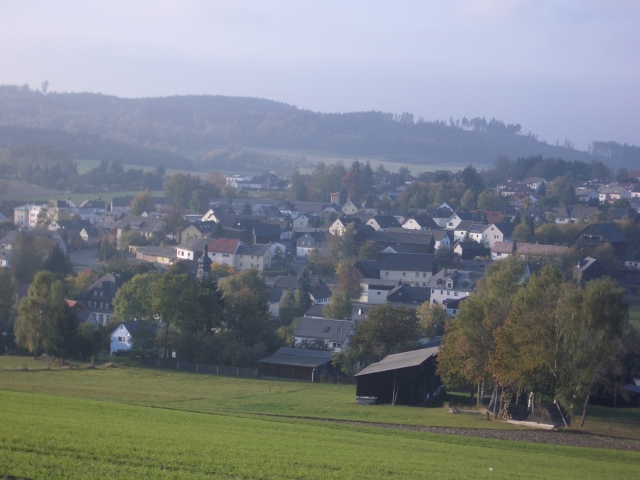
- Issigau

- Coat of arms

- Location of Issigau within Hof district
- Interactive map of Issigau
- Location within Germany Location within Bavaria
- Coordinates: 50°22′N 11°43′E
- Country: Germany
- State: Bavaria
- Admin. region: Oberfranken
- District: Hof
- Municipal assoc.: Lichtenberg
- Subdivisions: 10 Ortsteile

Government
  - Mayor (2020–26): Dieter Gemeinhardt (CSU)

Area
  - Total: 18.69 km^{2} (7.22 sq mi)
- Elevation: 524 m (1,719 ft)

Population (2025-12-31)
  - Total: 976
  - Density: 52.2/km^{2} (135/sq mi)
- Time zone: UTC+01:00 (CET)
  - Summer (DST): UTC+02:00 (CEST)
- Postal codes: 95188
- Dialling codes: 09293
- Vehicle registration: HO
- Website: www.issigau.de

Issigau is a municipality in Upper Franconia in the district of Hof in Bavaria in Germany. In lies on the Issig River.
