= Schauenstein =

- Town
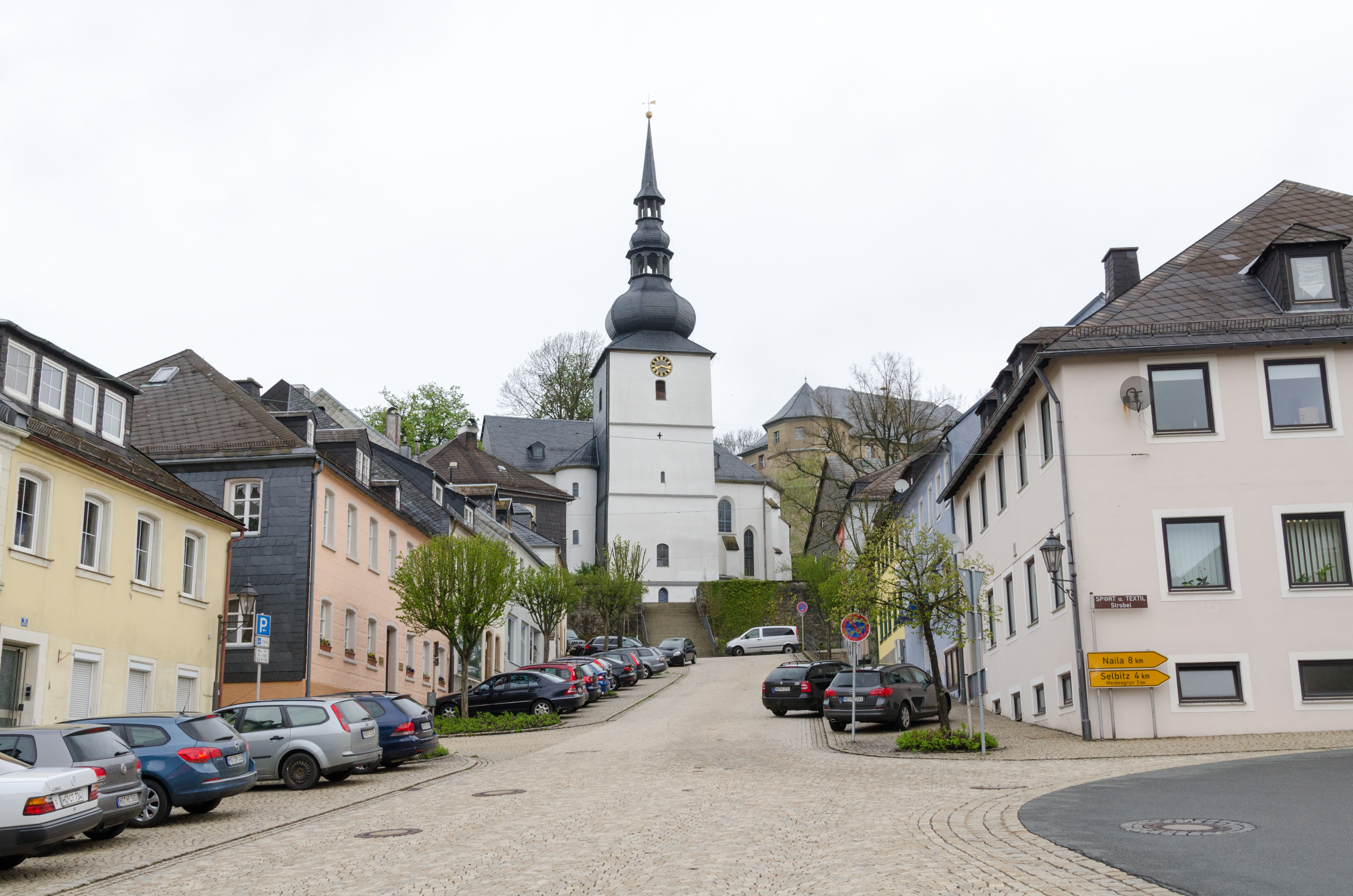
- Market square with the Church of Saint Bartholomew

- Coat of arms

- Location of Schauenstein within Hof district
- Interactive map of Schauenstein
- Location within Germany Location within Bavaria
- Coordinates: 50°16′N 11°46′E
- Country: Germany
- State: Bavaria
- Admin. region: Oberfranken
- District: Hof
- Municipal assoc.: Schauenstein
- Subdivisions: 17 Ortsteile

Government
  - Mayor (2020–26): Florian Schaller (CSU)

Area
  - Total: 26.66 km^{2} (10.29 sq mi)
- Elevation: 606 m (1,988 ft)

Population (2025-12-31)
  - Total: 1,830
  - Density: 68.6/km^{2} (178/sq mi)
- Time zone: UTC+01:00 (CET)
  - Summer (DST): UTC+02:00 (CEST)
- Postal codes: 95197
- Dialling codes: 09252
- Vehicle registration: HO
- Website: www.schauenstein.de

Schauenstein (German pronunciation: [ˈʃaʊənˌʃtaɪn]) is a town in the district of Hof, in Bavaria, Germany. It is situated 13 km west of Hof.
