= Feilitzsch =

- Municipality
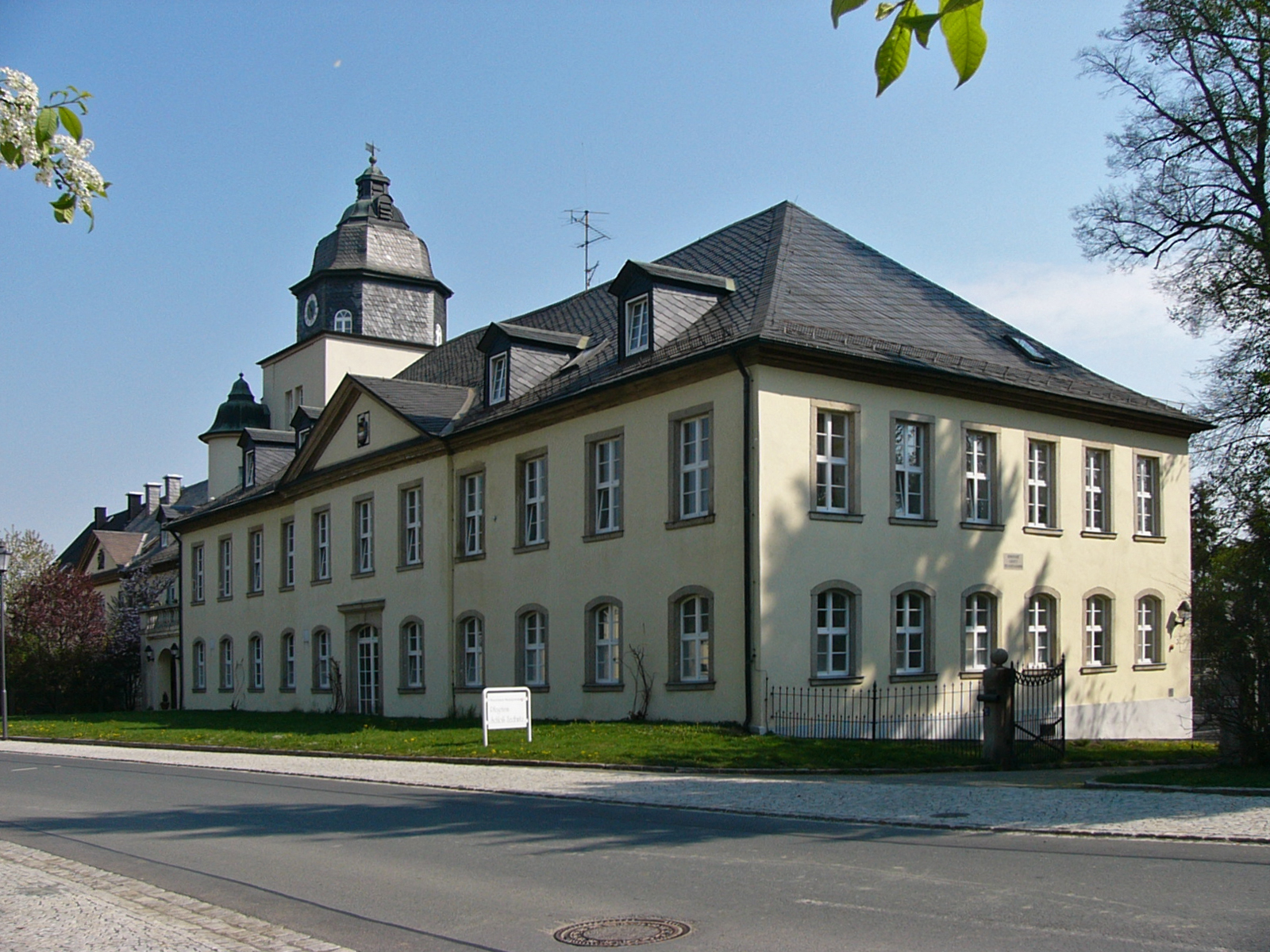
- Zedtwitz Castle

- Coat of arms

- Location of Feilitzsch within Hof district
- Interactive map of Feilitzsch
- Location within Germany Location within Bavaria
- Coordinates: 50°22′N 11°55′E
- Country: Germany
- State: Bavaria
- Admin. region: Oberfranken
- District: Hof
- Municipal assoc.: Feilitzsch
- Subdivisions: 9 Ortsteile

Government
  - Mayor (2020–26): Franz Hernandez Jimenez

Area
  - Total: 30.22 km^{2} (11.67 sq mi)
- Elevation: 500 m (1,600 ft)

Population (2025-12-31)
  - Total: 2,686
  - Density: 88.88/km^{2} (230.2/sq mi)
- Time zone: UTC+01:00 (CET)
  - Summer (DST): UTC+02:00 (CEST)
- Postal codes: 95183
- Dialling codes: 09281
- Vehicle registration: HO
- Website: www.feilitzsch.de

Feilitzsch (German pronunciation: [ˈfaɪlɪtʃ]) is a municipality in Upper Franconia in the district of Hof in Bavaria in Germany.
