= Lichtenberg, Bavaria =

Lichtenberg
- Town
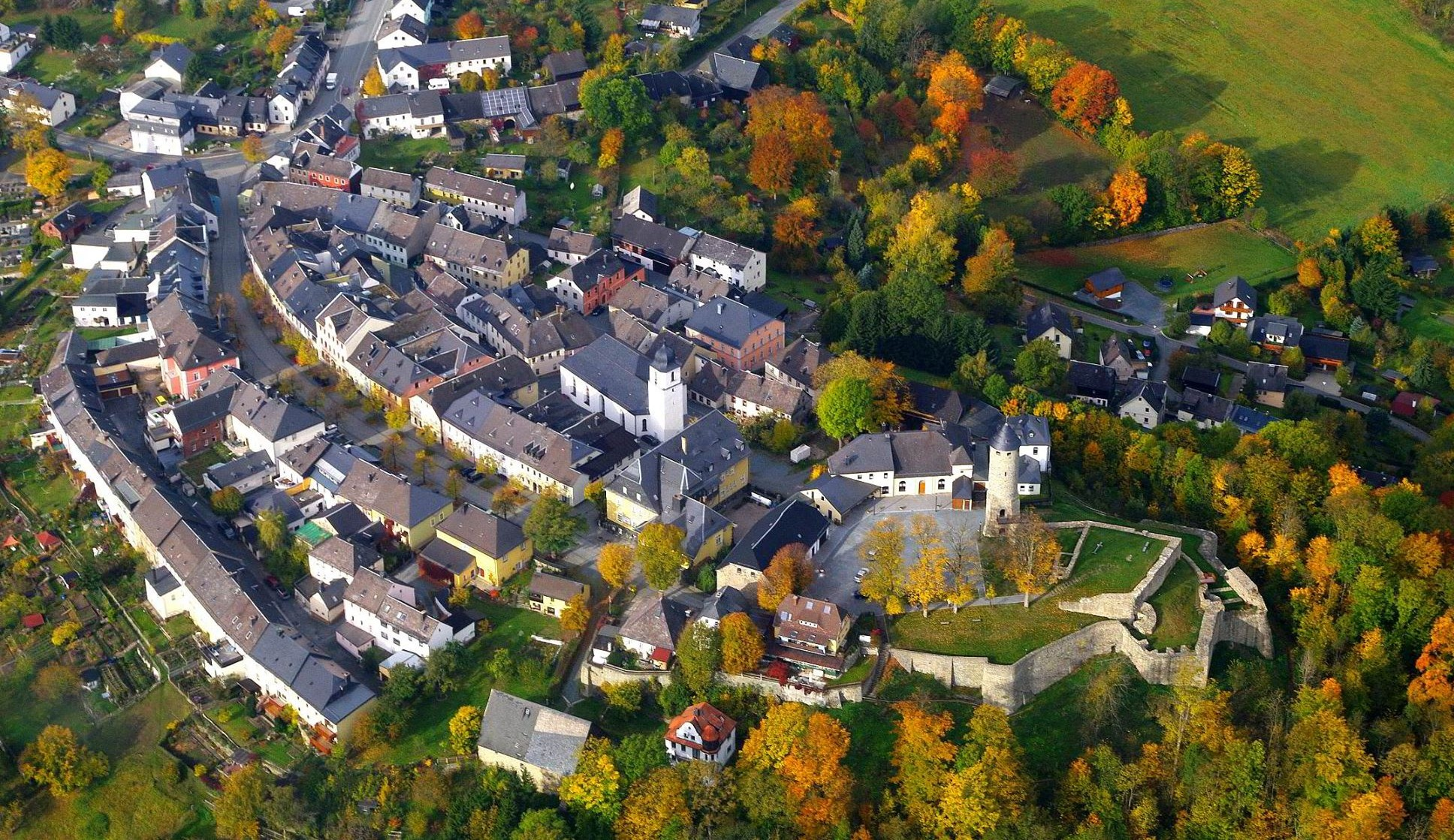
- Aerial view of Lichtenberg with Lichtenberg Castle in the foreground

- Coat of arms

- Location of Lichtenberg within Hof district
- Interactive map of Lichtenberg
- Location within Germany Location within Bavaria
- Coordinates: 50°23′01″N 11°40′33″E
- Country: Germany
- State: Bavaria
- Admin. region: Oberfranken
- District: Hof
- Municipal assoc.: Lichtenberg

Government
  - Mayor (2020–26): Kristan von Waldenfels

Area
  - Total: 9.47 km^{2} (3.66 sq mi)
- Elevation: 564 m (1,850 ft)

Population (2025-12-31)
  - Total: 927
  - Density: 97.9/km^{2} (254/sq mi)
- Time zone: UTC+01:00 (CET)
  - Summer (DST): UTC+02:00 (CEST)
- Postal codes: 95192
- Dialling codes: 09288
- Vehicle registration: HO
- Website: www.lichtenberg -oberfranken.de

Lichtenberg (German pronunciation: [ˈlɪçtn̩bɛʁk]) is a town in northeastern Bavaria in the district of Hof in Upper Franconia.

It lies on a hill above the valley of the river Selbitz, in the Frankenwald nature park.

== History ==
The town's origins reach back to the 9th century. New and expanded buildings were built and occupied by the dukes of Meranien in the 12th century. The counts of Orlamünde inherited the town in 1248. First mention of the town and its recognition as an independent municipality came in 1336.

During the Cold War division of Germany (1945–1990), Lichtenberg lay only a kilometre rom the inner German border, on the western side.

== Medieval fair ==
Each September, the Friends of Lichtenberg Castle hold a festival in the ruins of the castle.

== Haus Marteau ==
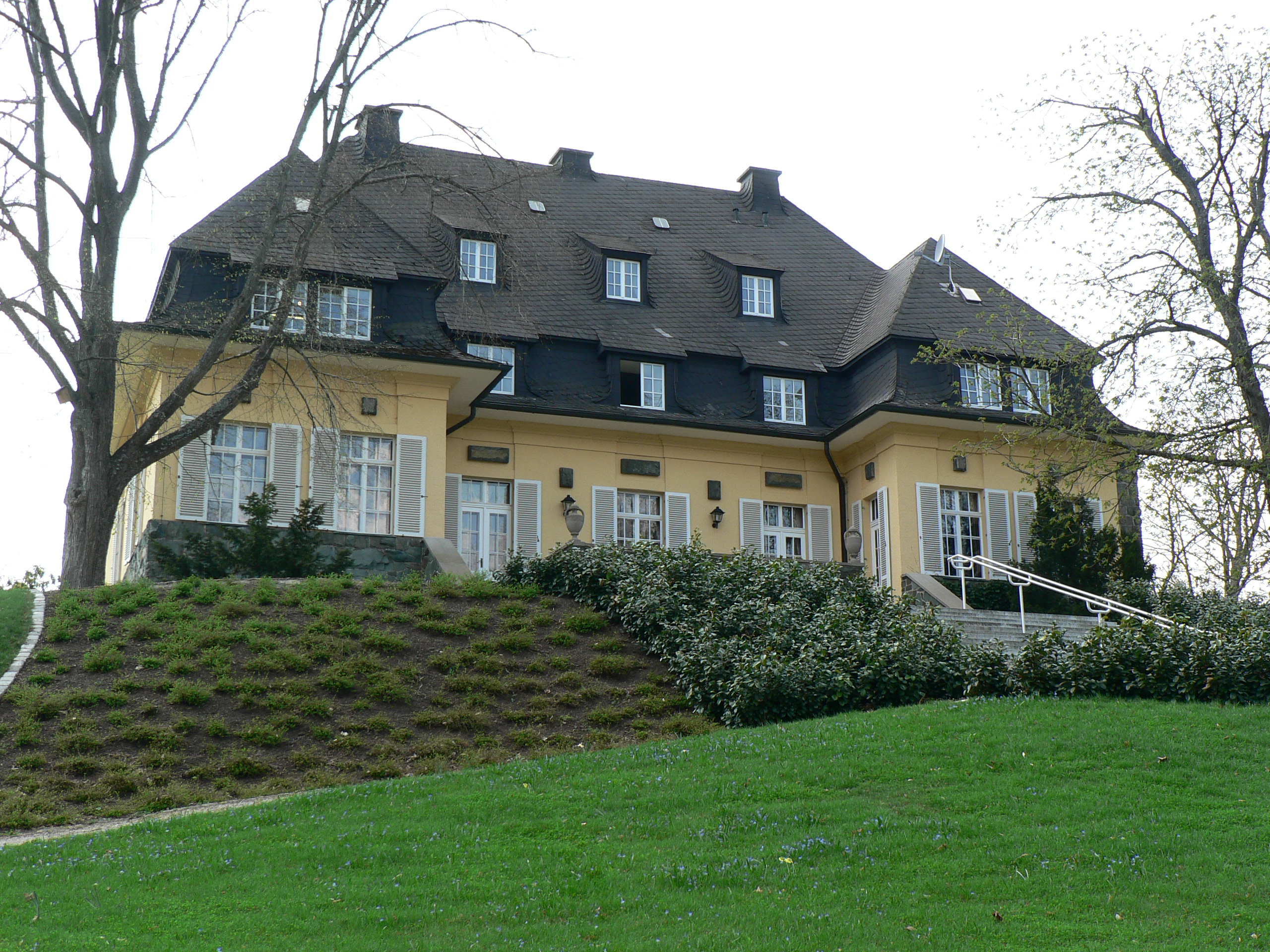
Haus Marteau

In association with the government of Upper Franconia, Lichtenberg is the location of Haus Marteau (Internationale Musikbegegnungsstätte Haus Marteau), an international music center named after the famous violinist and former resident Henri Marteau. The center offers musical courses and master classes in several subjects all year. Every three years, the International Violin Competition Henri Marteau takes place at Haus Marteau and at the Freiheitshalle in Hof.
