= Franconian Forest =

Mountain range in Germany

Coordinates: 50°18′N 11°36′E

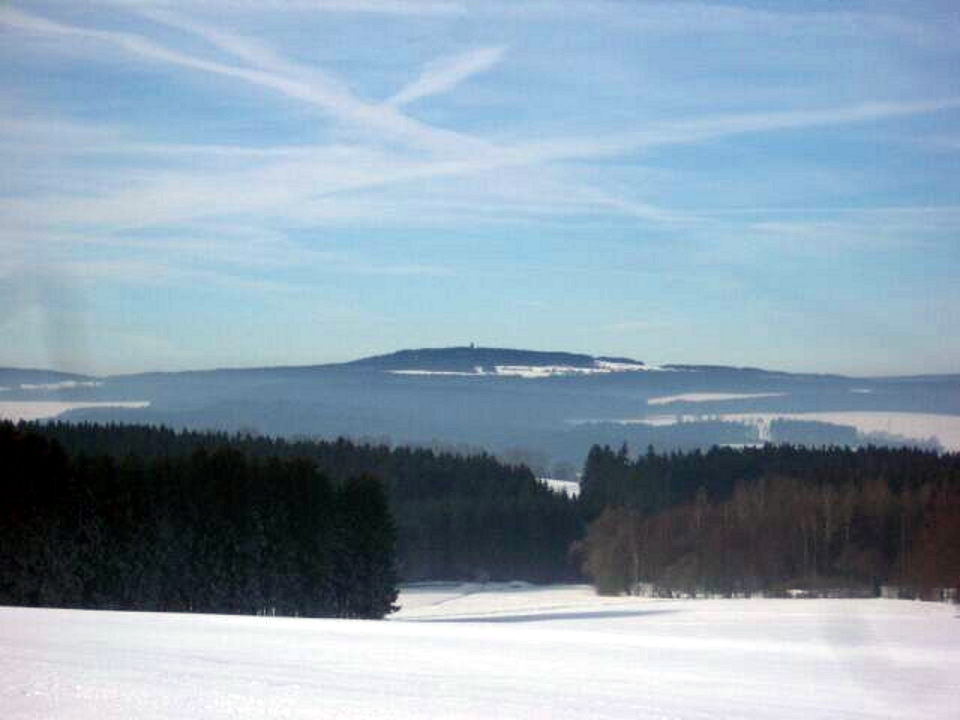
View to Döbraberg

The Franconian Forest (German: Frankenwald, pronounced [ˈfʁaŋkn̩ˌvalt]), is a mid-altitude mountain range in Northern Bavaria, Germany. It is located in the district of Upper Franconia (Oberfranken) and forms the geological connection between the Fichtel Mountains and the Thuringian Forest. It is a broad well-wooded plateau, running for about 45 kilometres (28 mi) in a northwesterly direction, descending gently on the north and eastern sides towards the Saale river, but more precipitously to the Bavarian plain in the west, and attaining its highest elevation in the Döbraberg near Schwarzenbach am Wald (794 metres). Along the centre lies the watershed between the basins of the Main and the Saale, belonging to the systems of the Rhine and Elbe respectively. A protected nature reserve, Höllental, is located in the Forest.
