= NMX =

NMX or nmx may refer to:

- ticker symbol of the New York Mercantile Exchange at the New York Stock Exchange
- ISO code for the Nama language of Papua New Guinea

== Railway stations ==
- station code of the New Maynaguri railway station, India
- station code of the Marxgrün station, Germany

== See also ==
- MMX (disambiguation)
