= Stadler Regio-Shuttle RS1 =

Diesel multiple unit

Regio-Shuttle RS1
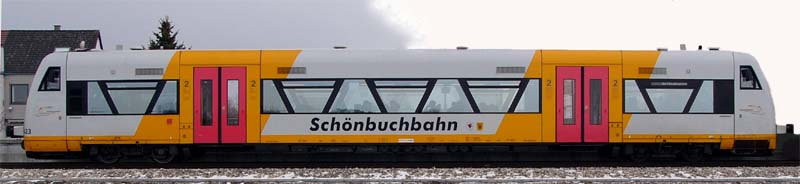
- Regio-Shuttle of the Württembergische Eisenbahngesellschaft (WEG)
- Manufacturers: Adtranz (1996–2001); Stadler (2001–2013)
- Built at: Berlin-Wilhelmsruh
- Constructed: 1996–2013
- Number built: 497 (as of September 2011)

Specifications
- Car length: 24.46–25.5 m (80 ft 3 in – 83 ft 8 in)
- Width: 2.9 m (9 ft 6 in)
- Height: 3.7 m (12 ft 2 in)
- Maximum speed: 120 km/h (75 mph)
- Weight: 40 t (88,000 lb) empty
- Axle load: 10 t (22,000 lb)
- Traction motors: 2 × 257 kW (345 hp)
- Power output: 514 kW (689 hp)
- Transmission: Hydrokinetic
- UIC classification: B′B′
- Safety systems: Sifa, PZB90

The Regio-Shuttle RS1 is a diesel railcar widely used for local rail services in Germany and the Czech Republic. Its most distinctive feature is its trapezoidal-shaped window frames. Around 500 units were built between 1996 and 2013. Originally a product of ADtranz, the RS1 was subsequently manufactured and marketed by Stadler after Bombardier was required to sell the Berlin-Wilhelmsruh production site in 2001 for antitrust reasons following its acquisition of ADtranz. The Regio-Shuttle is classified by the Deutsche Bahn as Class 650, by the České Dráhy as Class 840 or Class 841. Numerous private railways also operate Regio-Shuttle cars.

== Technical information ==
The RS1 is a standard gauge railcar built to UIC standards, which therefore can withstand longitudinal forces of 1,500 kN (340,000 lb_{f}); it is available with centre buffer couplings or the usual European buffers and chain couplers. 65% of the vehicle floor is low-level and designed for a platform height of 55 cm (22 in). On the Schönbuchbahn a special variant designed for 76 cm (30 in) platforms is in use. The railbus has a high-level floor over the two four-wheeled bogies at each end.

Two independent diesel-mechanical drive units, e.g. from MAN, run either on diesel fuel or biodiesel from rape seed oil, each drive both axles on one of the two bogies.

The RS1's appearance is striking because its window design looks like a timber-framed bridge support (or Warren truss), the angled bodyshell pillars being visible at the windows. This construction was originally proposed to ABB (later ADtranz) by Design Triangle during a research study into weight reduction for high speed trains. The study, reported in a paper to the Institution of Mechanical Engineers in 1996, showed that the diagonal pillar concept allowed mass reduction, improved passenger views and flexibility of seating layout, whilst maintaining adequate body strength and stiffness. ABB applied for a patent on the design. The Bombardier Itino uses a similar angled window pillar design. A similar window pillar design had been used on the Schienenzeppelin railcar in 1929.

From an operational point of view the Regio-Shuttle may be used for one-man operations on full gauge railways without any restrictions. Its relatively small capacity (maximum under 170 passengers) is balanced by the fact that the vehicle can be driven in multiples of up to seven units. A rake of five RS1's can thus handle a maximum of just under 850 passengers, albeit somewhat uneconomical compared with a locomotive-hauled train due to the fuel consumption of its ten diesel motors.

In 2006 a Regio-Shuttle was converted by Voith. Amongst other things it was to have stricter exhaust emission and the top speed was to be raised to 140 km/h (87 mph). A production series was to follow, however it looks as if the production of the Regio-Shuttle ceased in 2006. In 2007 and 2008 further orders followed from the ODEG, the HzL and Rhenus Veniro. Including machines on order, the total number of manufactured Regio-Shuttles comes to 365 units. At the end of June 2008 the Deutsche Bahn AG agreed a contract with Stadler for the delivery of up to 60 Regio-Shuttles. These were to be called off if DB Regio were successful in winning tenders and needed Regio-Shuttles for the services envisaged.

== Current operators ==
=== Overview of railway companies ===
The following railway companies have Regio-Shuttle RS1's in their fleet:

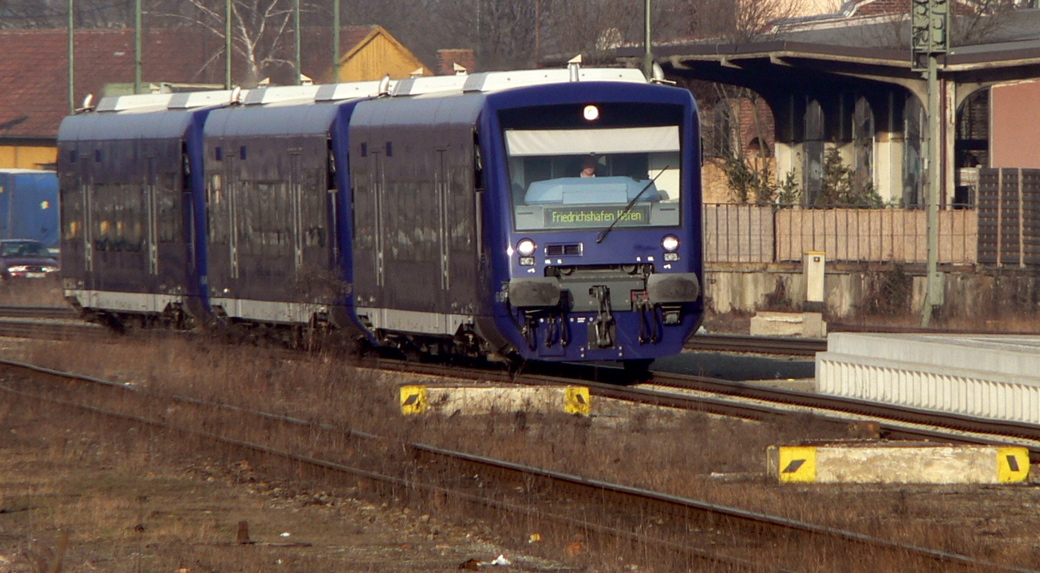
Bodensee-Oberschwaben-Bahn (BOB)
7 units

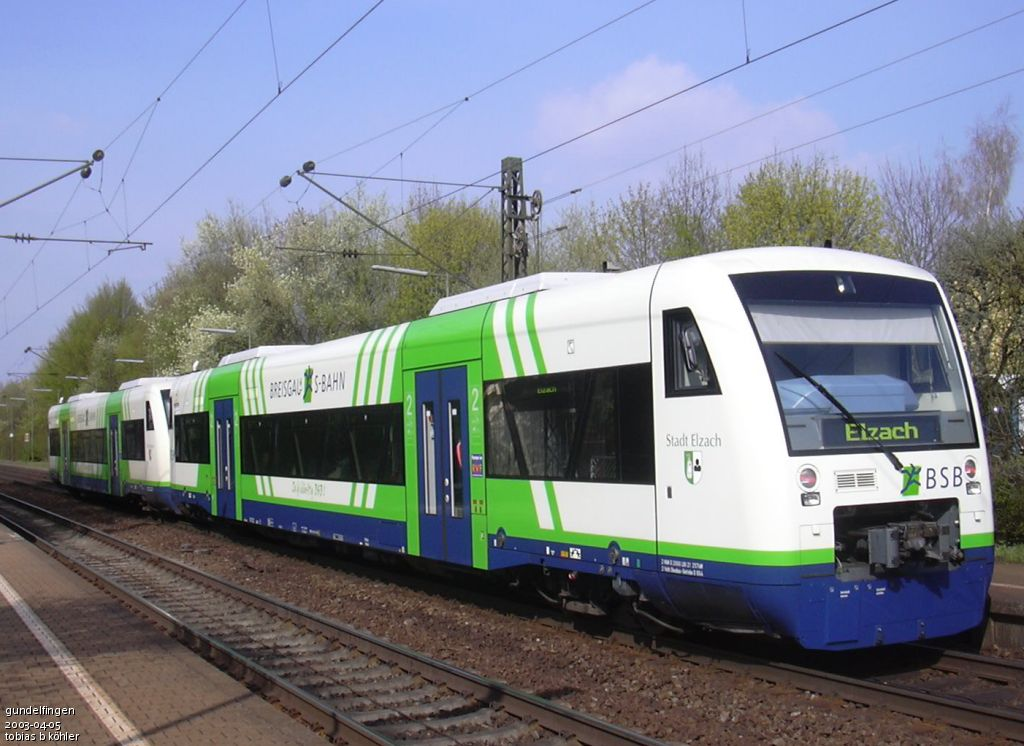
Breisgau-S-Bahn (BSB)
21 units

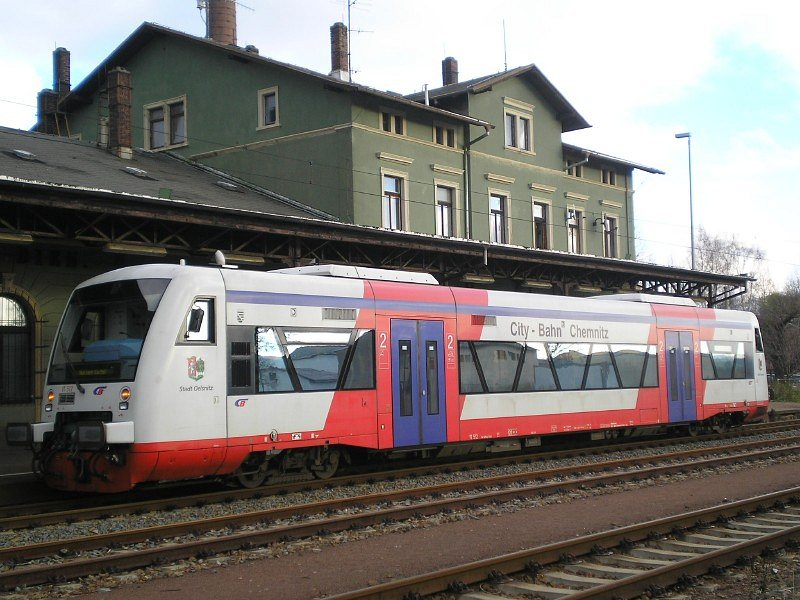
City-Bahn Chemnitz (CBC)
6 units

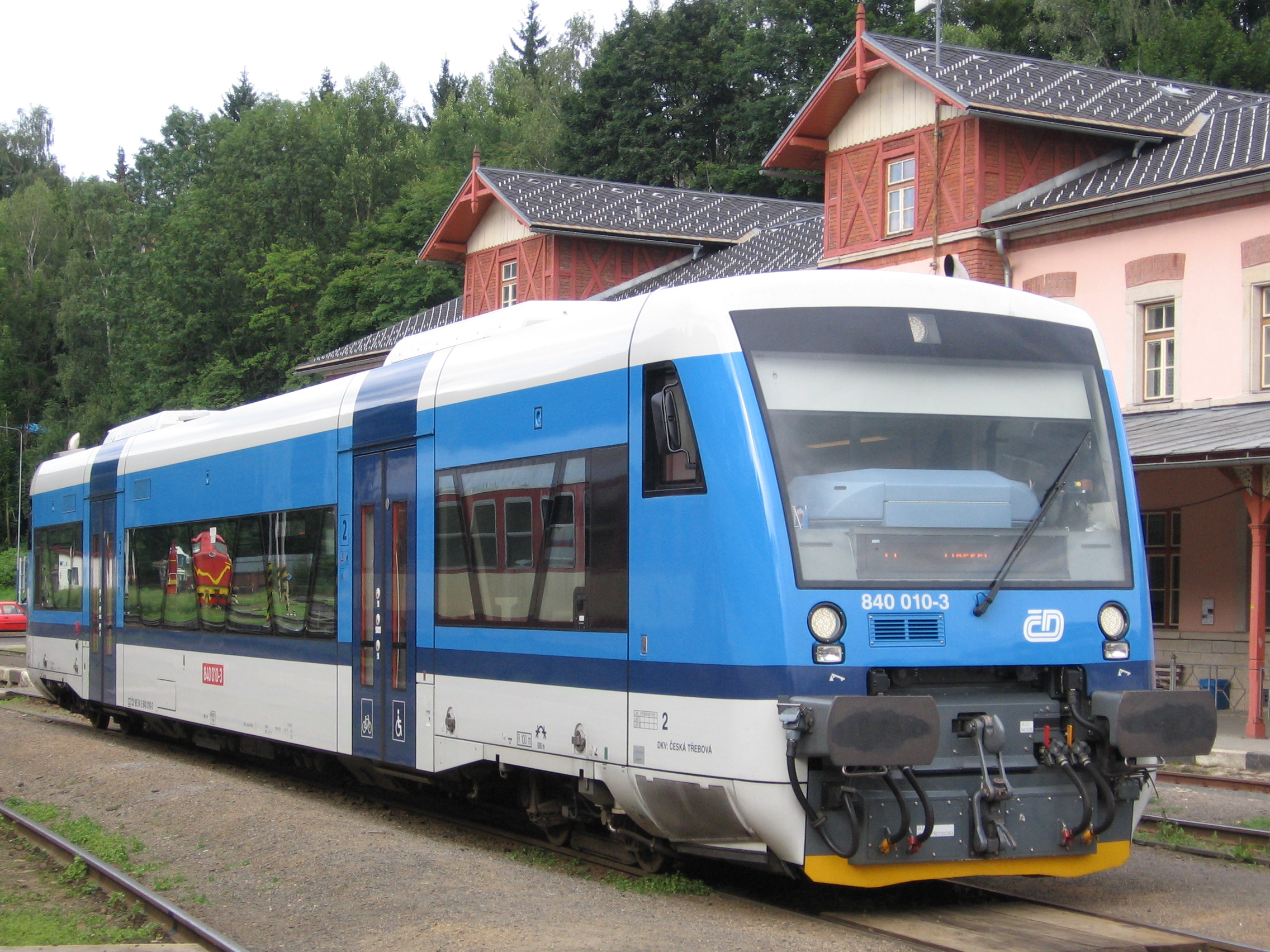
České Dráhy (ČD)
55 units

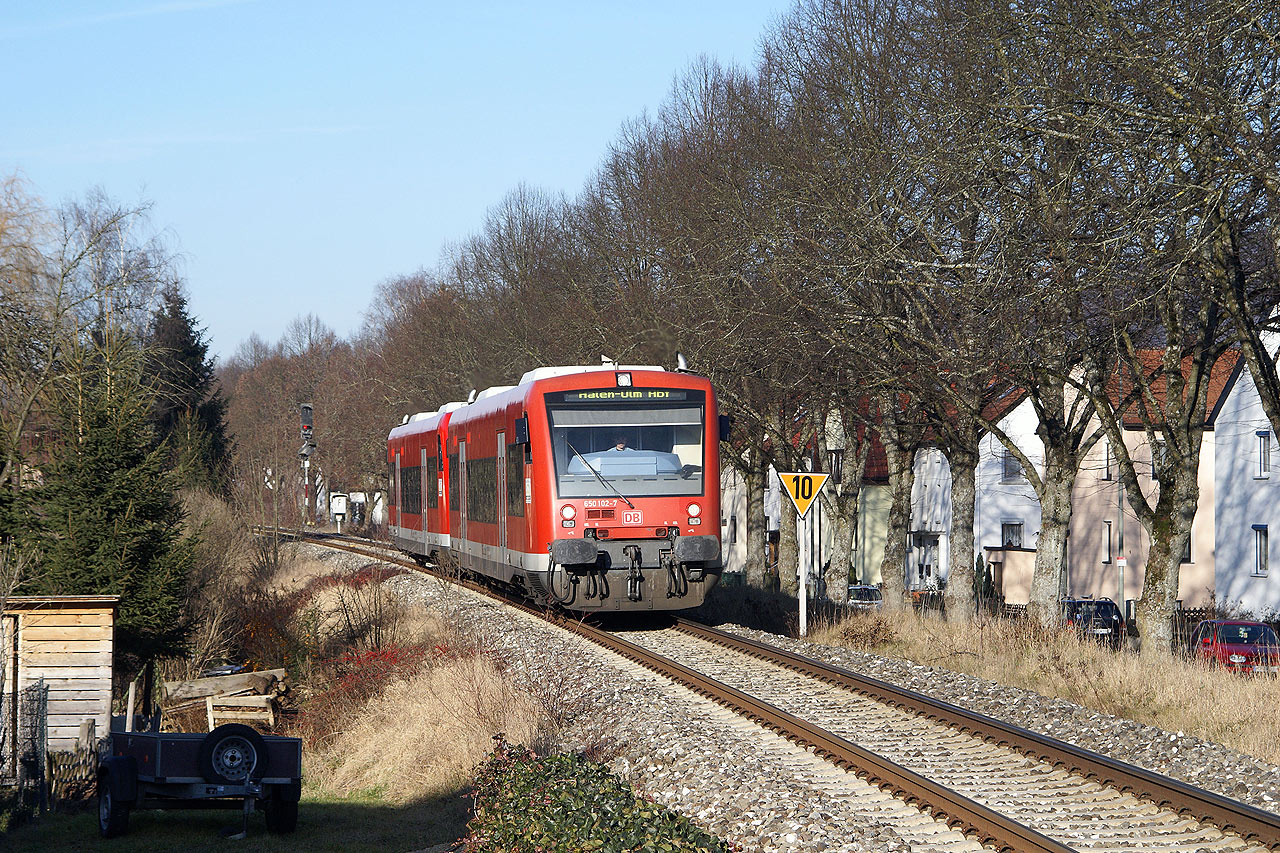
DB ZugBus Regionalverkehr Alb-Bodensee (RAB)
74 units

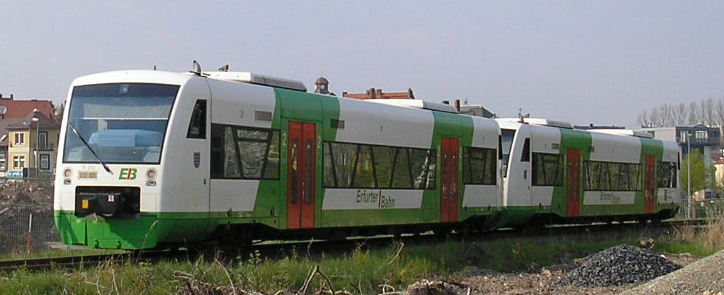
Erfurter Bahn (EB)
23 units

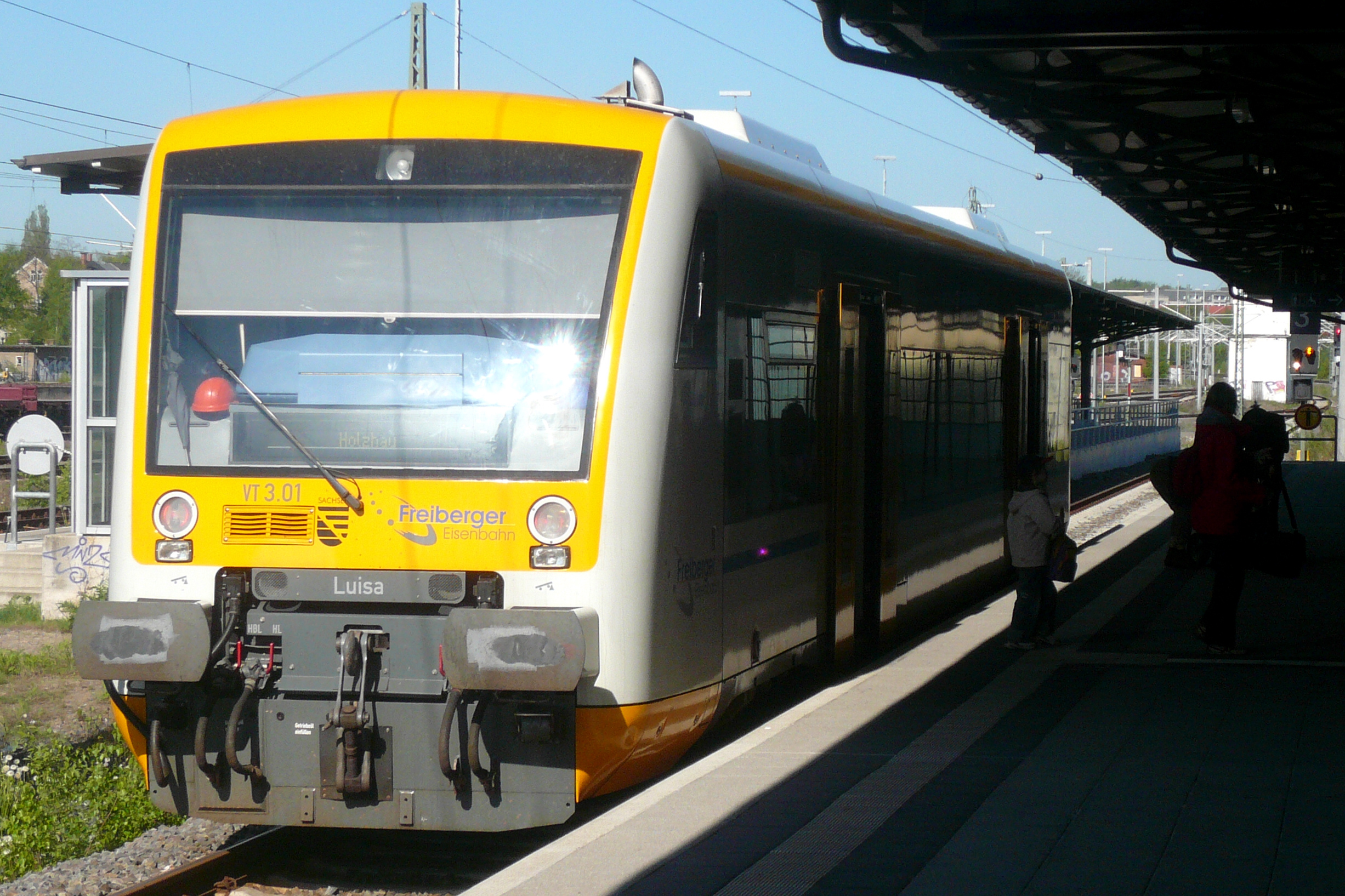
Freiberger Eisenbahngesellschaft mbH (FEG)
3 units

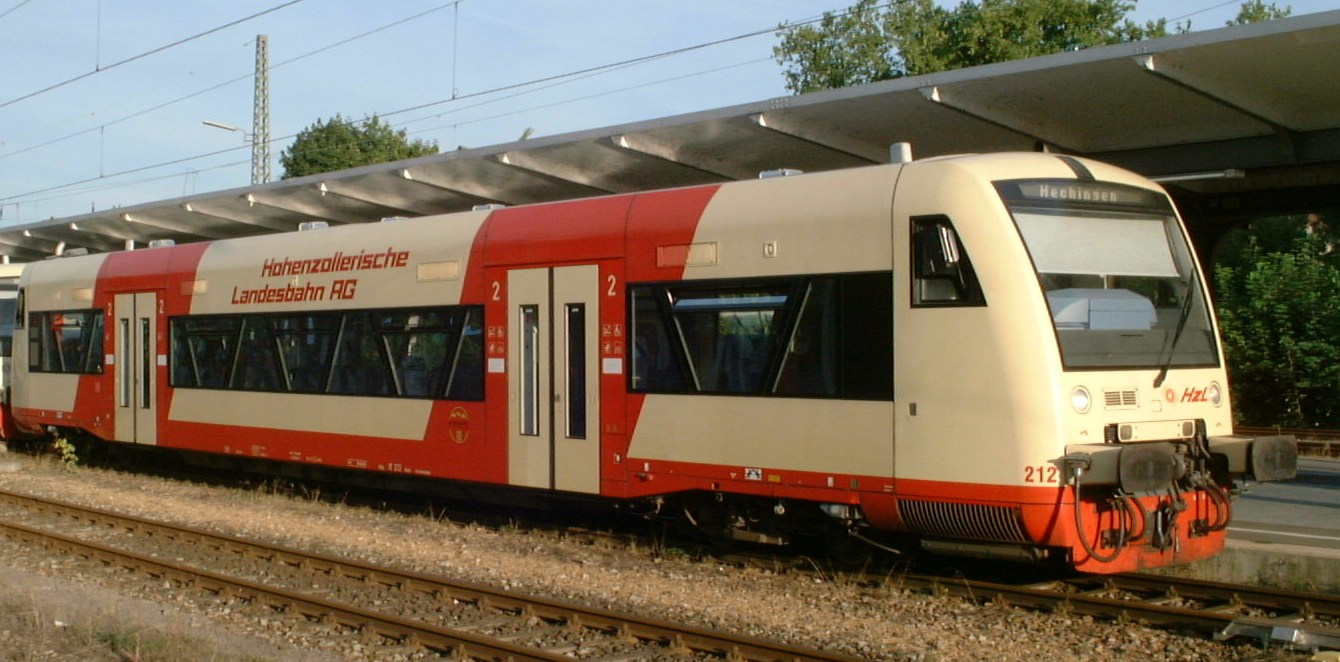
Hohenzollerische Landesbahn (HzL)
24 units

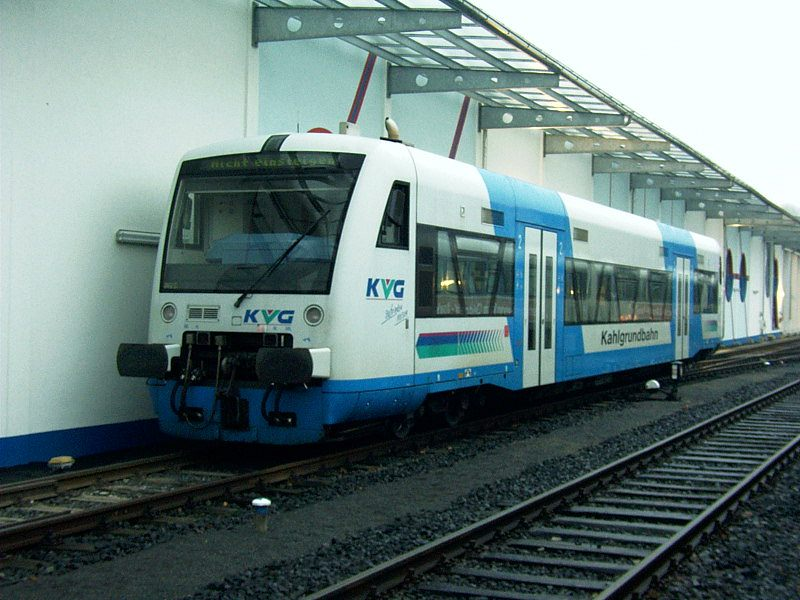
Kahlgrund Verkehrs-GmbH (KVG)
1 units (since sold)

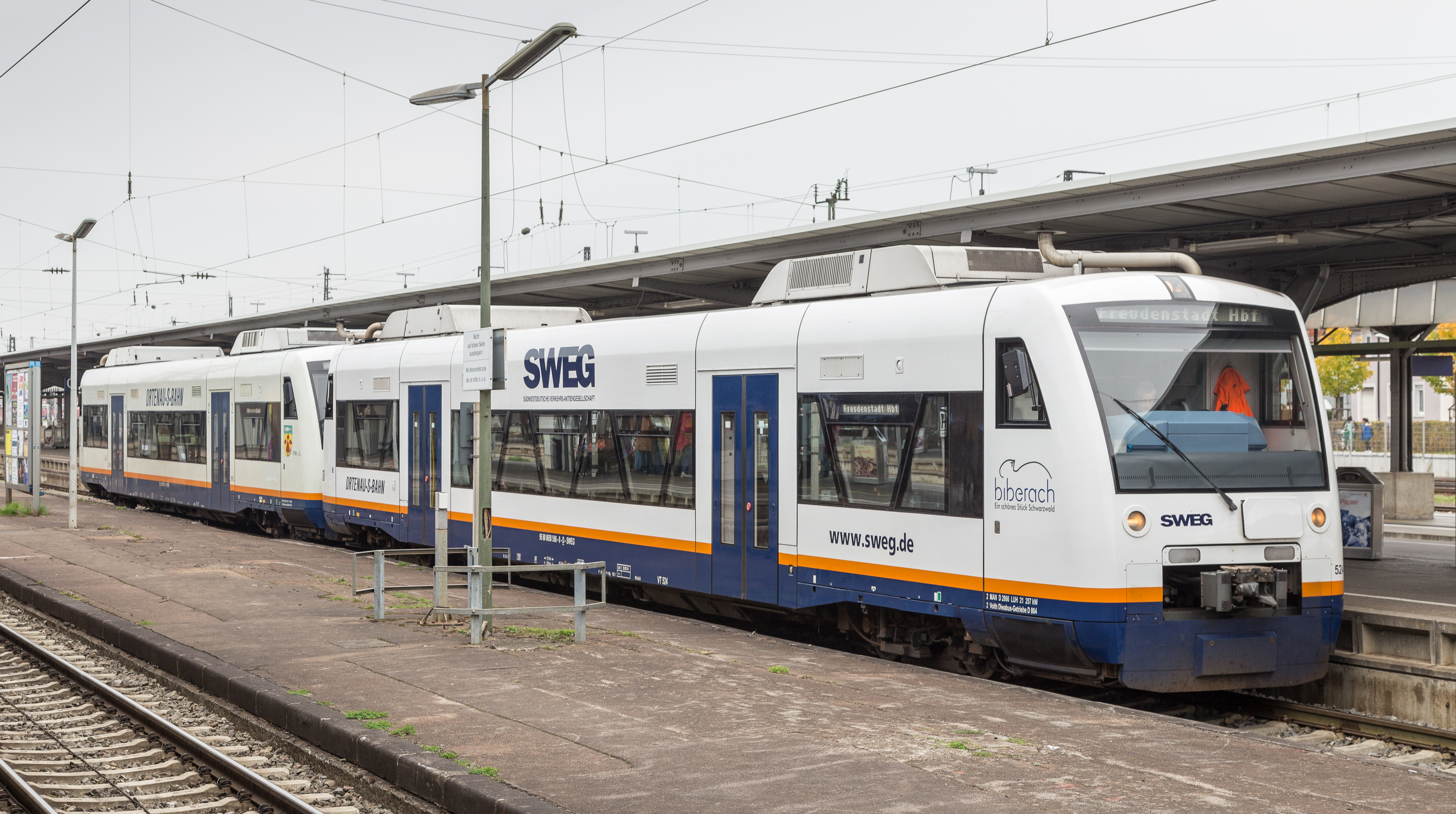
Ortenau-S-Bahn (OSB)
24 units

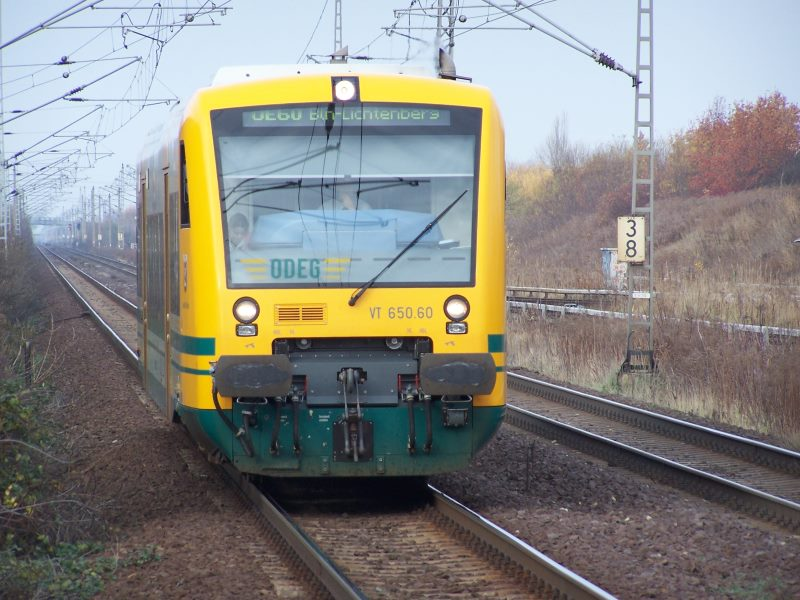
Ostdeutsche Eisenbahn (ODEG)
33 units (+2 on order)

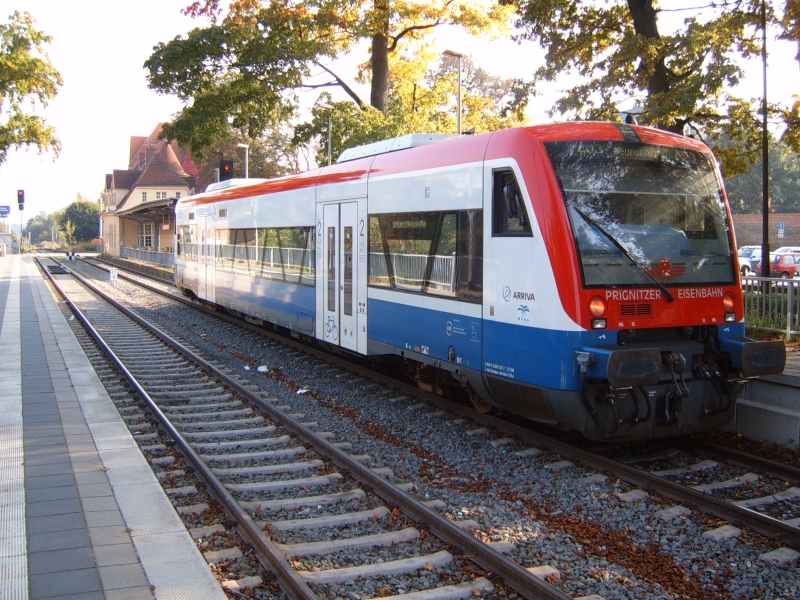
Prignitzer Eisenbahn (PEG)
8 units

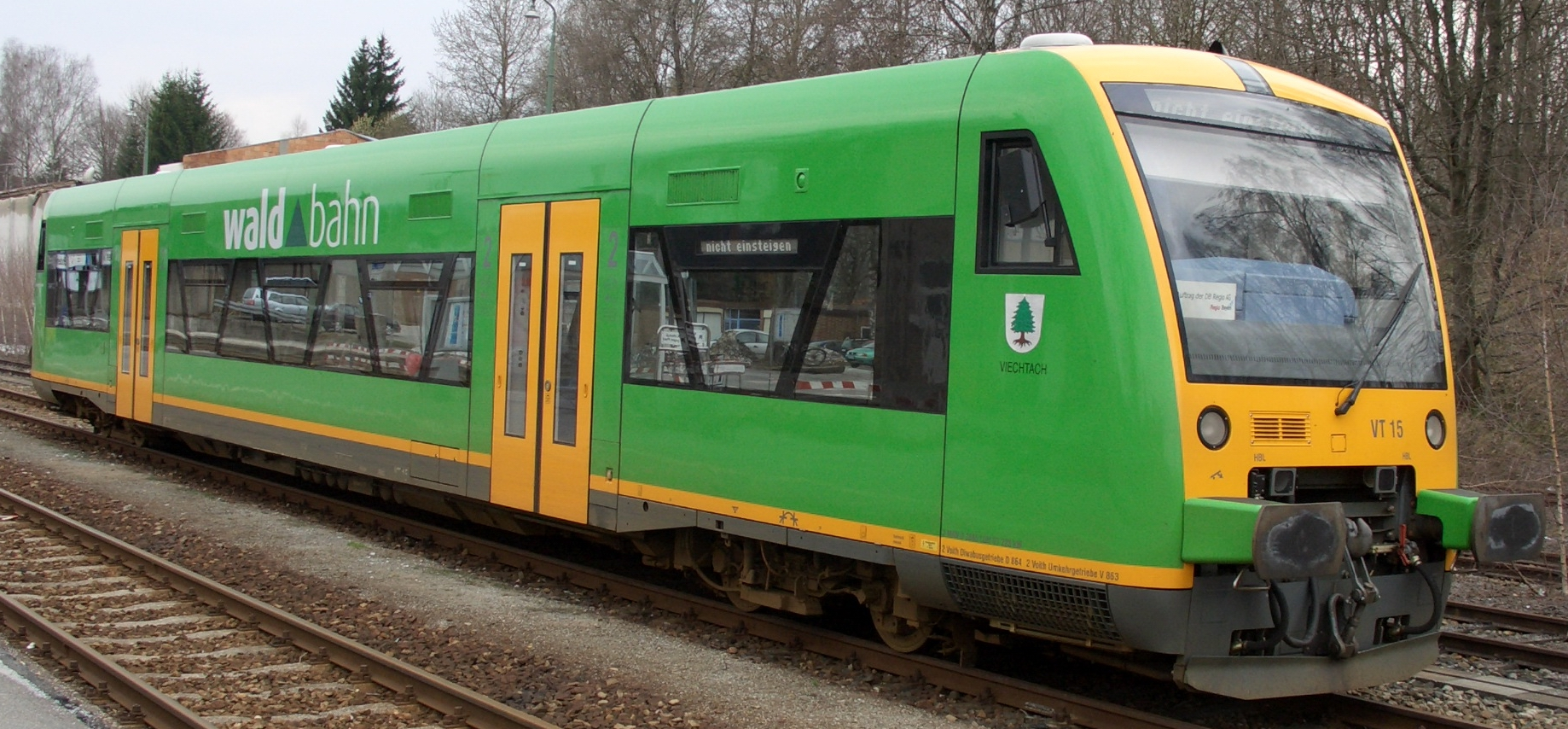
Regentalbahn AG
25 units

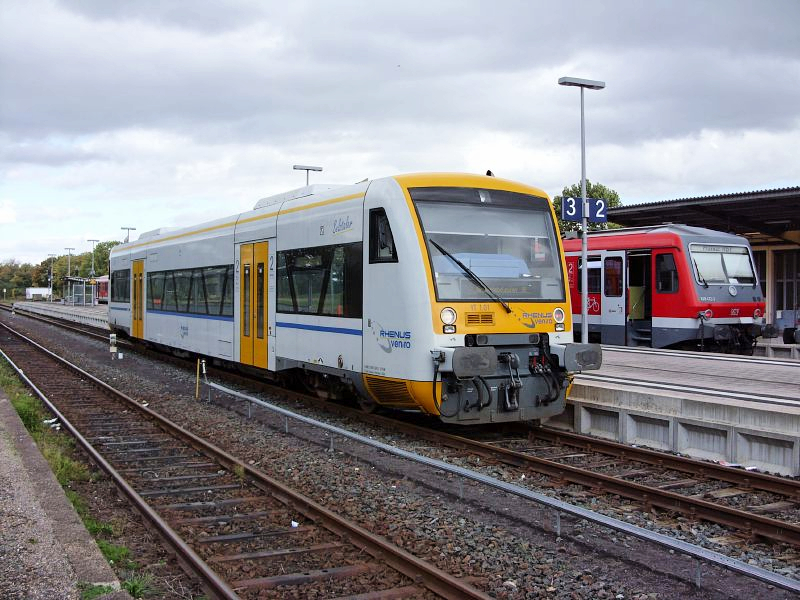
Rhenus Veniro
2 units (+3 on order)

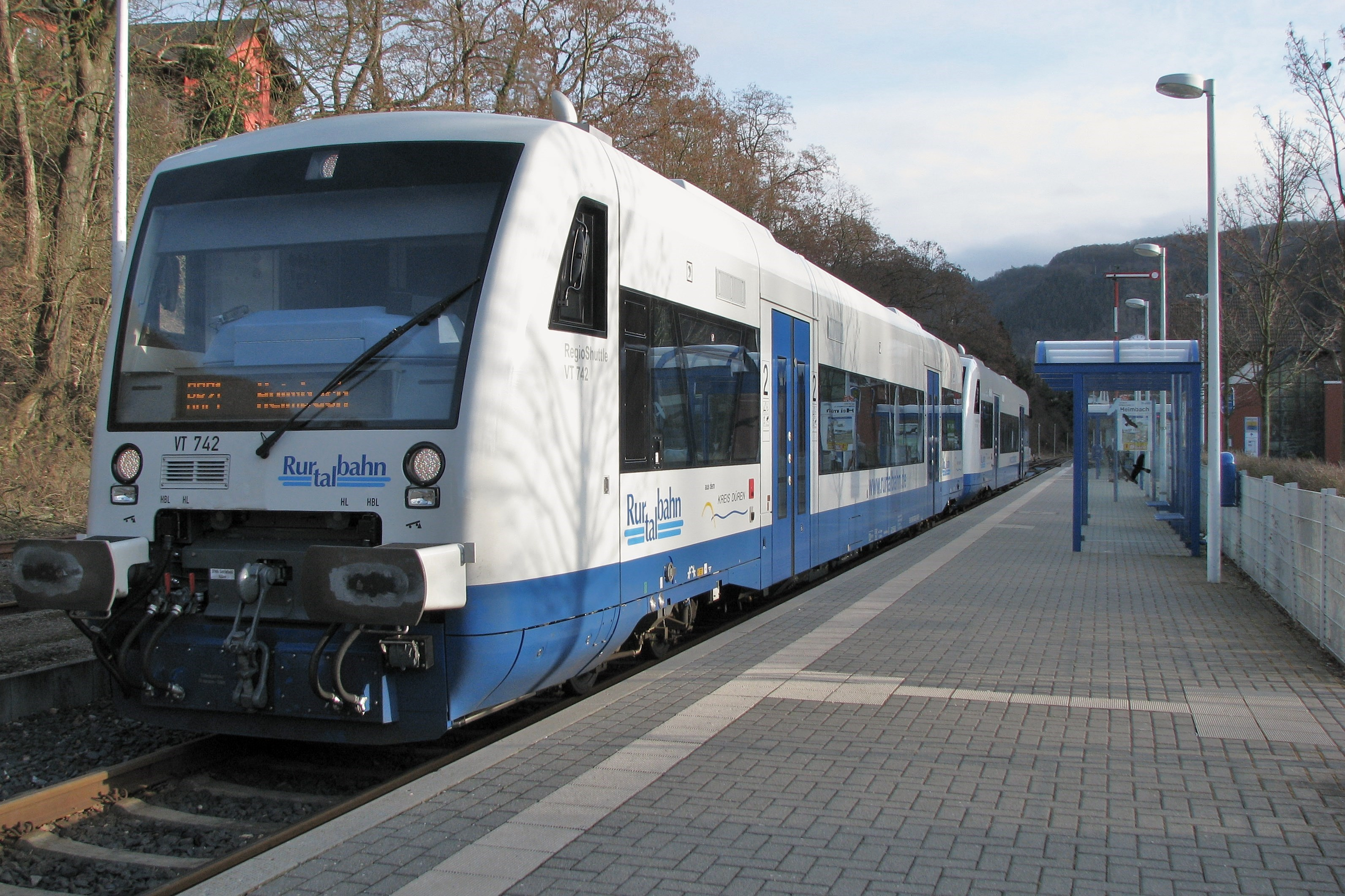
Rur Valley railway
5 units

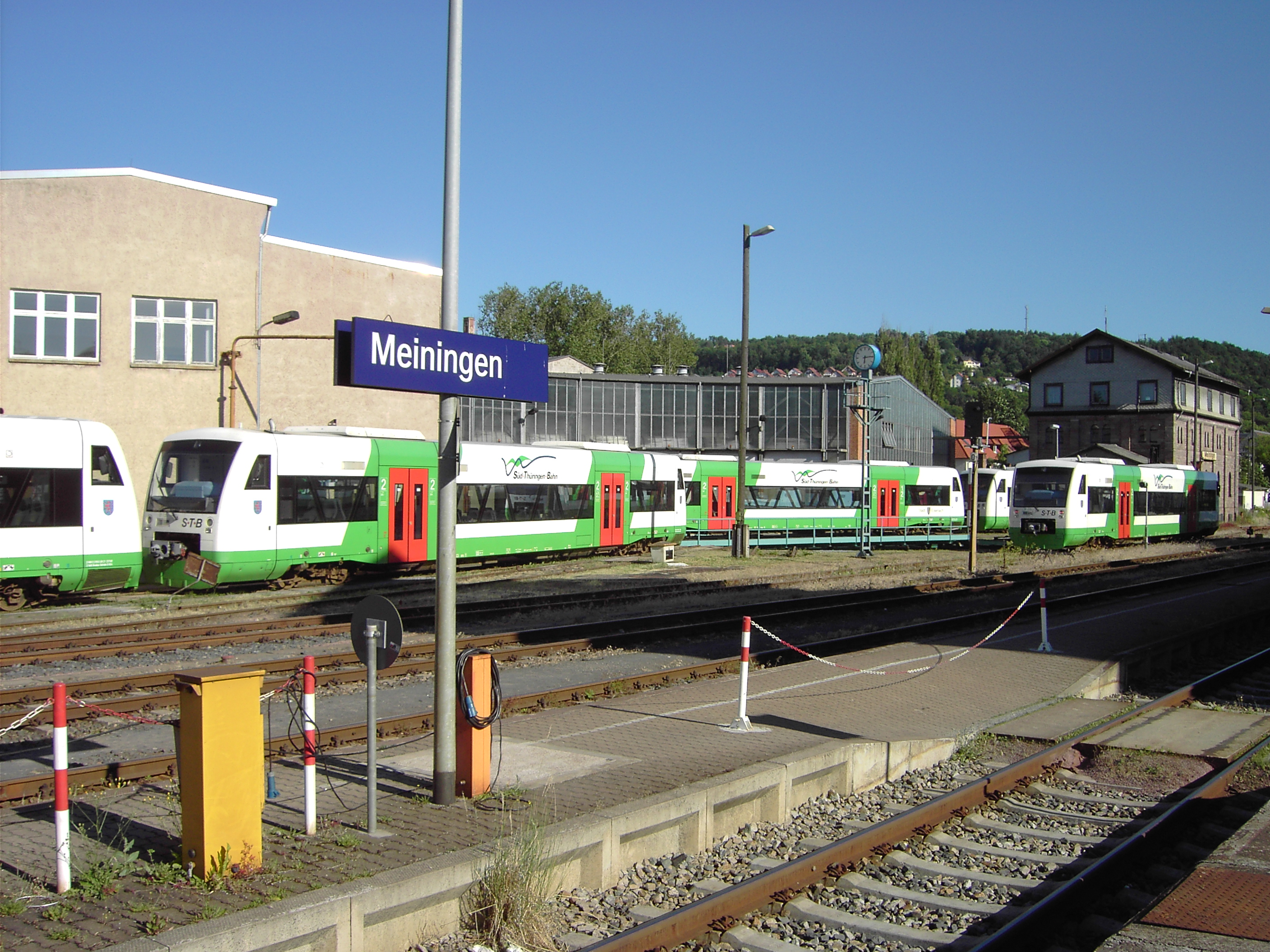
Süd-Thüringen-Bahn (STB)
32 units

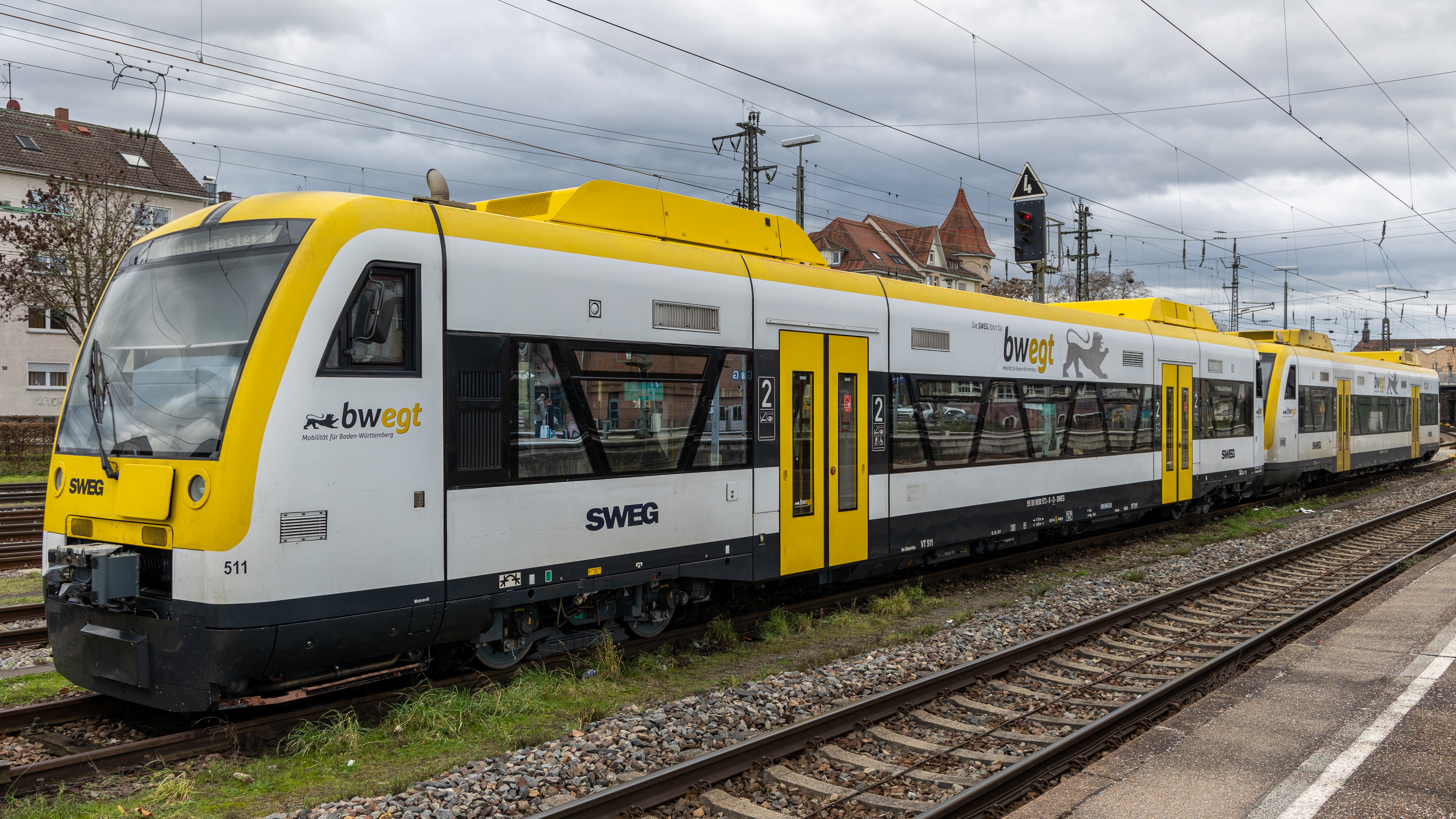
Südwestdeutsche Verkehrs AG (SWEG)
8 units

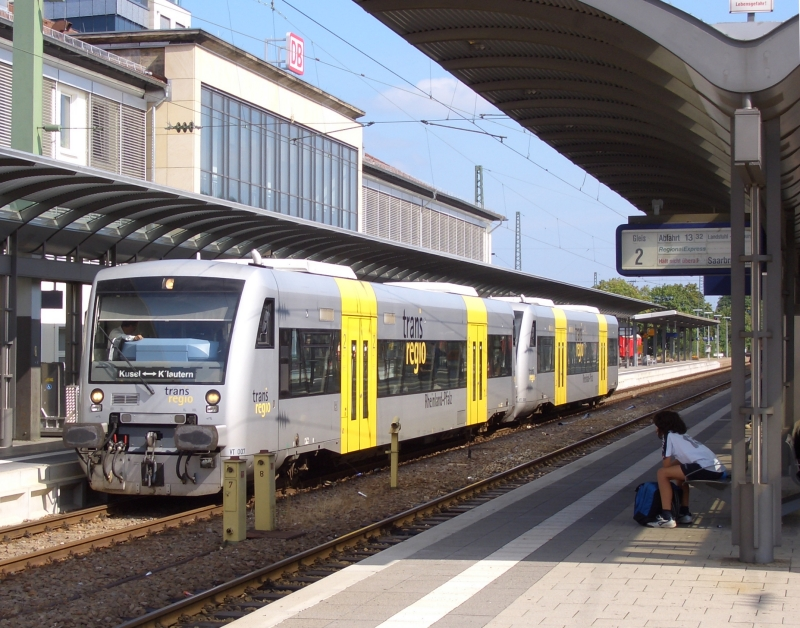
Transdev Germany
20 units

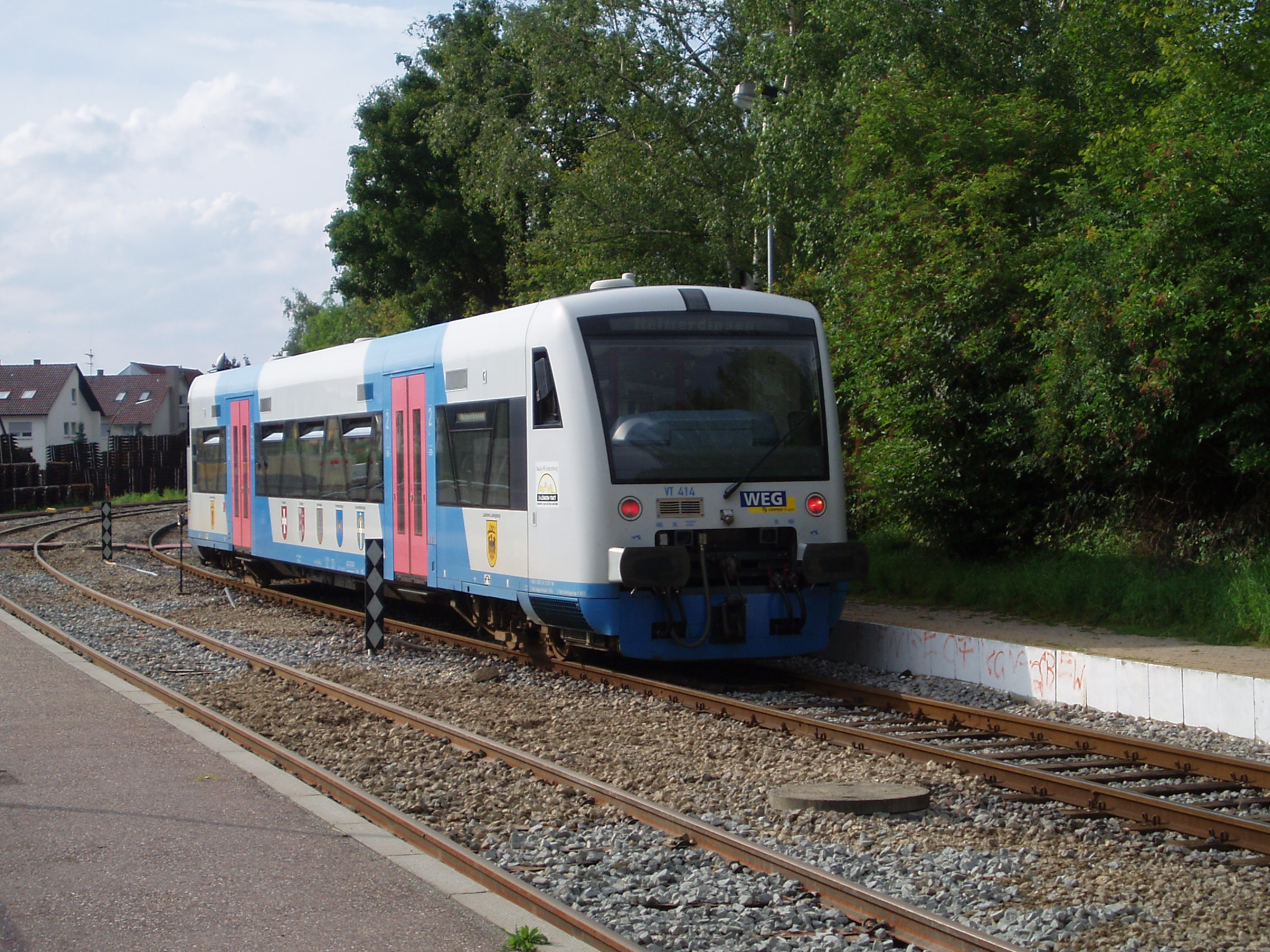
Württembergische Eisenbahn-Gesellschaft (WEG)
11 units

=== Employment by Deutsche Bahn ===
In 1999 the Deutsche Bahn began to place Class 650 railbuses into service and currently runs 74 units (as at: June 2005). They are numbered 650 001–027, 650 100–122, 650 201–203 and 650 301–321. 650 100–119 and 650 201–203 were funded by Baden-Württemberg. 650 001–027 and 650 100–122 are identical, 650 201–203 and 650 301–321 are cyclist shuttles, but otherwise constructionally identical with the Regio-Shuttles. The vehicles are operated from Tübingen and Ulm by DB subsidiaries DB ZugBus Regionalverkehr Alb-Bodensee (RAB). Since May 2000 all the vehicles have been in daily service.

Since 2007, numbers 650 322–327, funded by DB Regio Bayern, have also been in operation. In addition, the WestFrankenBahn has taken over a railbus from the Kahlgrundbahn, number 650 997. This railbus has since been transferred to the SüdostBayernBahn and was deployed in 2008 on the Traun-Alz-Bahn between Traunstein and Traunreut.

=== Employment by České Dráhy ===
In 2011 České Dráhy classified new type of regional train as Class 840 (two magnetic track brakes for steep-grade service; gearing for 100 km/h) for routes in Liberecký kraj and little different Class 841 (one magnetic track brake; maximum speed 120 km/h) for routes in Kraj Vysočina. From 2011 to 2012 was delivered 16 units of 840 (840 001-016) to Liberecký kraj. In 2011, 841 001 was delivered to Kraj Vysočina, and a further 16 units (841 002-017) were delivered from 2012 to 2013. In December 2020 České Dráhy purchased an additional 22 units from SWEG Hohenzollerische Landesbahn, increasing the total number of Stadlers' diesel railcars from 33 to 55. As of June 2021, 17 out of 22 units were delivered. The remaining 5 railcars were to have been delivered by the end of 2021. In December 2022, České Dráhy announced the purchase of 11 railcars from Swiss company Helvetic Rolling Stock GmbH, bringing the total number of railcars in their fleet to 67.
