= Naila station =

Railway station in Naila, Germany

Naila
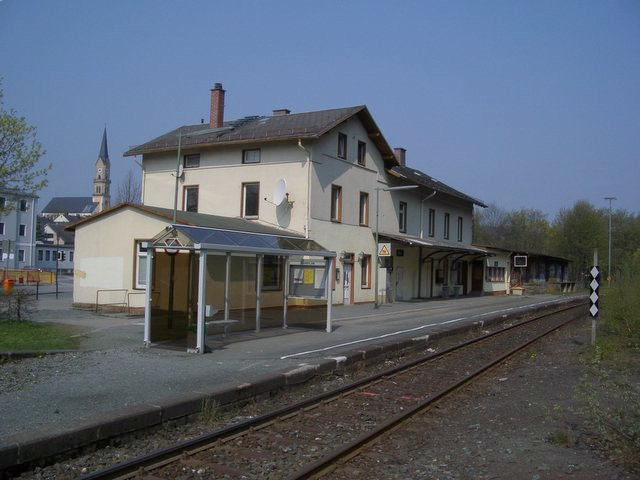
- 2006

General information
- Location: Bahnhofstraße 10; 95119 Naila; Bavaria; Germany
- Coordinates: 50.3296°N 11.7120°E
- Elevation: 509 m (1,670 ft)
- System: Bf
- Owner: Deutsche Bahn
- Operator: DB Station&Service
- Lines: Hof–Bad Steben railway (KBS 857); Naila–Schwarzenbach am Wald railway (KBS 838)
- Platforms: 1 side platform
- Tracks: 1
- Train operators: agilis

Construction
- Parking: yes
- Cycle facilities: yes
- Accessible: yes

Other information
- Station code: 4296
- DS100 code: NNIL
- IBNR: 8004198
- Category: 6
- Website: www.bahnhof.de

Services
Preceding station		Following station
Selbitz towards Bayreuth Hbf	RB 97	Marxgrün towards Bad Steben
Location
- Location within Bavaria Location within Germany Location within Europe

Naila station is a railway station in the municipality of Naila, located in the Hof district in Bavaria, Germany.
