= Marxgrün station =

Railway station in Germany

Marxgrün
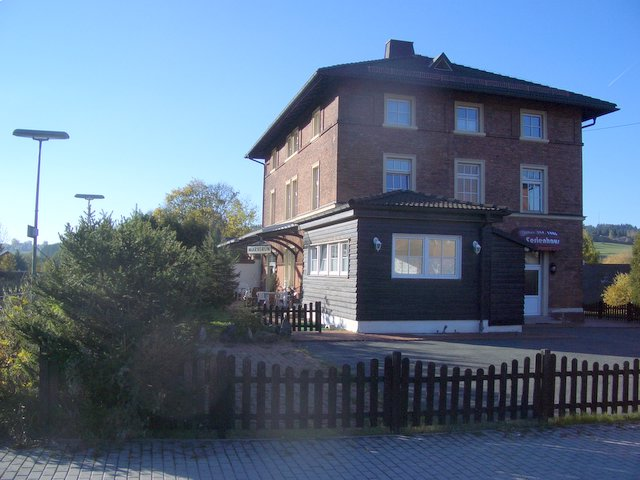
- Former station building with adjoining signal cabin

General information
- Location: Naila, Bavaria; Germany
- Coordinates: 50°21′18.49″N 11°41′11.87″E
- System: Through station
- Owner: Deutsche Bahn
- Operator: DB Station&Service
- Lines: Hof–Bad Steben KBS 857; (former Marxgrün–Lobenstein KBS 556 with extension to Saalfeld and Gera)
- Platforms: 1 running track (formerly 3 running tracks)

Other information
- Station code: 3994
- DS100 code: NMX
- IBNR: 8003903
- Category: 7
- Website: BEG station fact file

History
- Opened: 1887

Services
Preceding station		Following station
Naila towards Bayreuth Hbf	RB 97	Höllenthal towards Bad Steben
Location
- Location within Bavaria Location within Germany Location within Europe

The old Marxgrün station was located on the Hof–Bad Steben railway which was opened in 1887. It was the terminus on that line until 1898. From 1901 it became the junction for the railway line through the Höllen valley to Gera and, later, also Saalfeld. With the end of the Second World War the Höllen Valley railway (Höllentalbahn) losts its pan-regional significance and it was completely closed in the early 1980s. Today a halt has been built (Haltepunkt Marxgrün) on the site of the former station which is part of the Regionalbahn from Hof to Bad Steben. The village of Marxgrün has been a district of the town of Naila since 1978.

== History ==
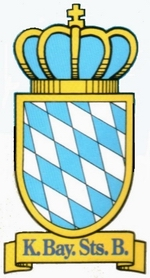

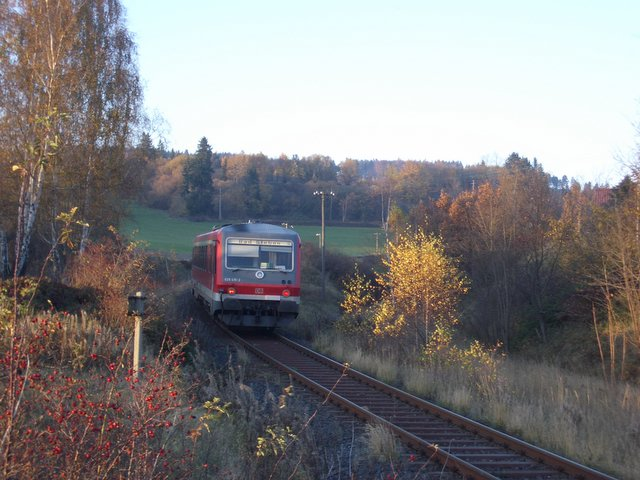
Regionalbahn to Bad Steben in Marxgrün; on the right the old trackbed in the Höllental can be seen

Railway network around Marxgrün

On 1 June 1887 this Lokalbahn (a type of Bavarian branch line) route in the eastern part of the Franconian Forest was opened by the Royal Bavarian State Railways (Königlich Bayerische Staats-Eisenbahnen or K.Bay.Sts.B.). Railway services started from the new Hof Hauptbahnhof, where there were connexions to Munich, Nuremberg, Würzburg, Berlin, Leipzig and Dresden. This standard gauge branch line reaches its terminus near the village of Marxgrün running via Selbitz and Naila.

The line from Hof to Marxgrün was extended in 1898 by the K.Bay.Sts.B. to the Bavarian state spa town of Steben. The engine shed and other railway facilities typical of terminal stations remained, however, in Marxgrün.

In 1901, a link was established to Thuringia. This new line ran through the Höllental to Blankenstein and from there to Triptis and Gera. The railway was built and operated by the Prussian state railways. The station of Marxgrün was therefore designated as the transfer station between the Bavarian and Prussian state railways. Later a branch to Saalfeld was added to this line. Following the formation of the Deutsche Reichsbahn through trains ran on the Hof–Marxgrün–Lobenstein–Saalfeld route.

The K.Bay.Sts.B. had plans in 1920 for another branch line from Marxgrün to Geroldsgrün. The existing railway facilities in Marxgrün, with its locomotive shed and workshop, would have been able to be used to support this route. The line was never built however.

On the foundation of the Deutsche Reichsbahn in 1924, Marxgrün station lost its role as a transfer station between Bavarian and Prussian state railways. Nevertheless, the boundary between the Regensburg railway division (Rbd) of the Bavarian Group Administration and the Thuringian division of Erfurt continued to be located on the approach to Marxgrün station.

In the Second World War diversionary routes were established for important main lines and they were upgraded accordingly. The Hof–Naila–Marxgrün–Lobenstein–Triptis–Gera route was part of such a diversion between southern and central Germany. As part of the upgrade of this route, Marxgrün station was given a mechanical signal box and semaphore signals for its approach and departure tracks.

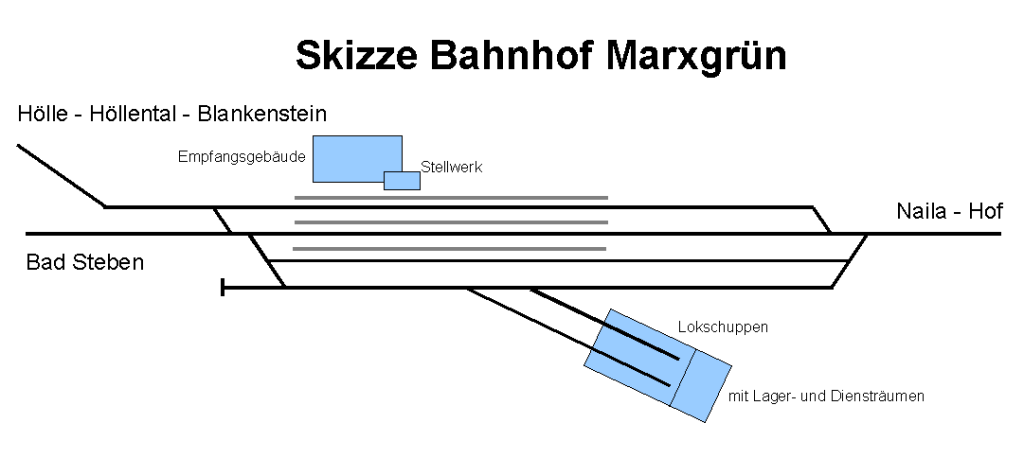
Track plan

This high point of the line's development was quickly followed by its low point. After the war the Inner German Border separated the German states of Bavaria and Thuringia. Rail services between Marxgrün and Blankenstein were withdrawn. Only goods traffic continued to run to the stations at Hölle and Lichtenberg on the edge of the Höllen valley. the section of line from Marxgrün to the border was finally transferred from Rbd Erfurt to Rbd Regensburg and therefore became "Bavarian".

== Buildings ==
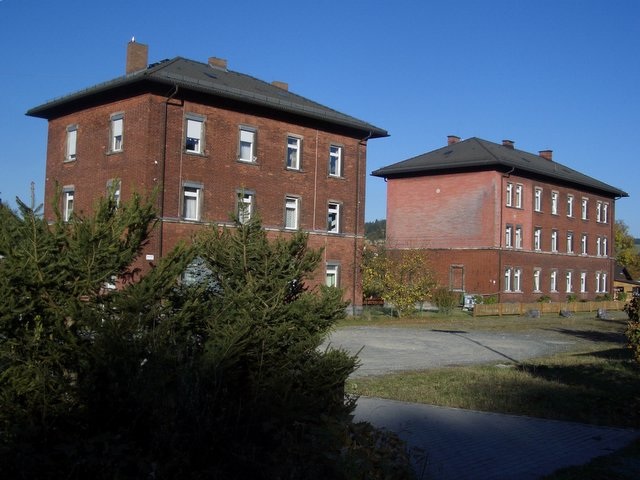
Railwaymen's accommodation blocks

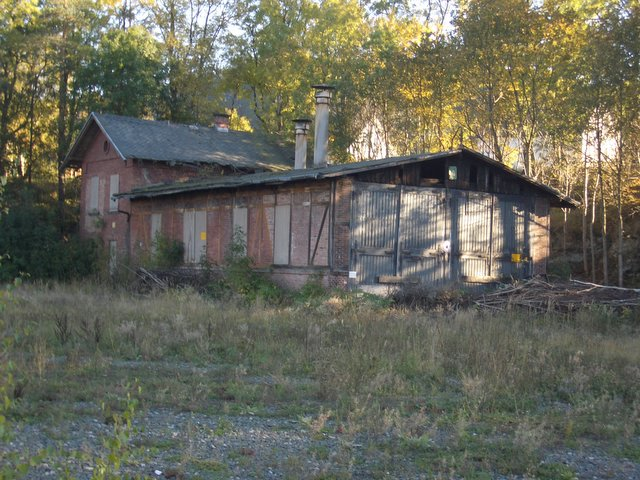
Engine shed and workshop

Within the former station yard the old station building still exists. It has become a holiday residence for holidaymakers. Attached to the station building is a wooden cabin in which the station's signal equipment added, as mentioned above, during the Second World War, was housed.

Next to the station building in the direction of Bad Steben and Höllental is a toilet block typical of the type found on Bavarian branch lines. Behind the station building are two former railwaymen's accommodation blocks. They are used today as rented accommodation.

On side of the station opposite the station building is the station's two-road locomotive shed with its attached workshop. The shed was the heart of locomotive operations in Marxgrün. The building, which has not been used for a long time, is increasingly dilapidated and is up for sale. At the end of the 20th century the locomotive for the planned museum railway was stored. When it was put up for sale, the shed had to be cleared and the locomotive was transferred to the shed at Bahnbetriebswerk Adorf.

== Features ==
- In Marxgrün station Horwagen marble was loaded onto the railway. In several publications this marble from Horwagen was therefore also described as Marxgrün marble. A stationary crane in the station was used to load the marble.
- Marxgrün is the railhead for the Bobengrün Whitsun Conference, an annual Christian, open-air gathering that attracts around 10,000 people.
- In autumn 1976 Marxgrün station was the location of the external scenes for the film The Stationmaster's Wife, directed by Rainer Werner Fassbinder. A steam locomotive stood by in Marxgrün for the filming.

== See also ==
- Royal Bavarian State Railways
- List of railway stations in Bavaria

== Sources ==
- Andreas Kuhfahl, Wolfram Alteneder: Die Nebenbahnen der BD Nürnberg. Verlag C. Kersting, Bonn 1986, ISBN 3-925250-02-6
- Siegfried Bufe: Eisenbahn in Oberfranken. Bufe-Fachbuch-Verlag, München 1982, ISBN 3-922138-13-6
- Ralf Roman Rossberg: Grenze über deutschen Schienen. Eisenbahn-Kurier Verlag, Freiburg im Breisgau 1980, ISBN 3-88255-828-8
- Robert Zintl: Bayerische Nebenbahnen. Motorbuch Verlag, Stuttgart 1977, ISBN 3-87943-531-6
- Deutsche Reichsbahn, Horst-Werner Dumjahn: Die deutschen Eisenbahnen in ihrer Entwicklung 1835-1935. Reichsdruckerei, Berlin 1935 / Nachdruck mit Vorwort von Horst-Werner Dumjahn: Dumjahn Verlag, Mainz 1984, ISBN 3-921426-29-4
