= DB Regio Oberfranken =

Business area with Deutsche Bahn

DB Regio Oberfranken is a business area with the German national railway company, Deutsche Bahn (DB), with its headquarters in Hof (Saale). It is responsible for the majority of regional and local railway services in the Bavarian province of Upper Franconia (Oberfranken).

== Trains ==
Because there are no electrified railways from Hof, the city can only be reached by diesel-engined rail vehicles. After heavy investment by Deutsche Bahn around the turn of the century, trains have changed in just a few years from diesel-hauled coaches to modern diesel multiple units. Today in Hof there are 45 VT 612 tilting trains and 27 conventional VT 628 units stationed there. The VT 612 are mainly employed on Regional-Express routes. One exception is the through connexion of RE trains from Würzburg/Lichtenfels via Hof as Regionalbahn trains to Bad Steben. This enables passengers to travel the whole route without changing.

== Locomotive depot ==
DB Regio Oberfranken owns the locomotive depot at Hof, Betriebswerk Hof, a 68,000 m^{2}, modern workshop, which specialises in tilting train technology. Here the Class 612 and 628 are inspected, maintained and repaired. The workshop was modernised in 2000 and 2001 for about 4 million euros.

== Routes ==
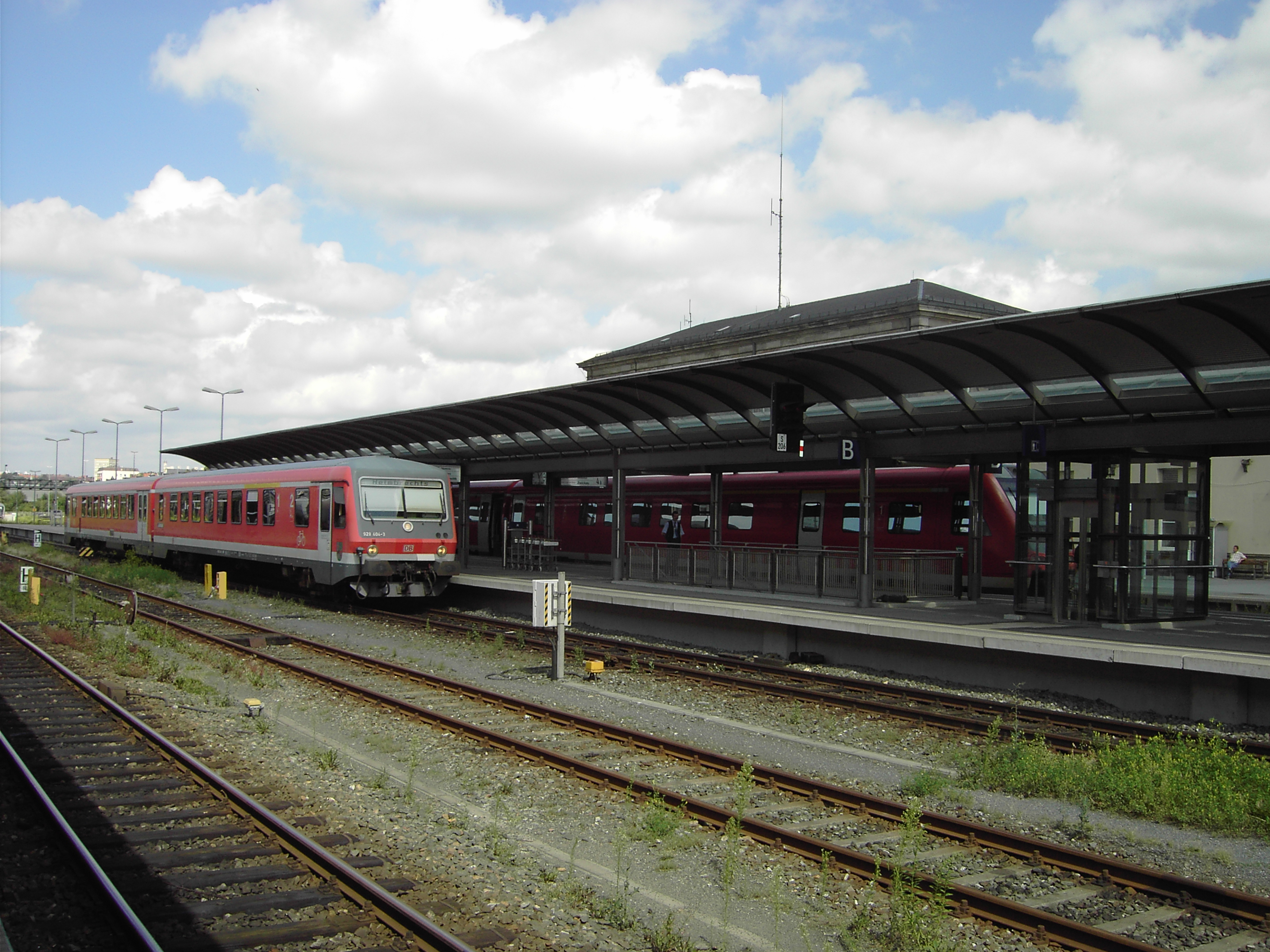
VT 628 in Hof Hbf

This transport region covers most of the routes in Upper Franconia. The following are some of the routes for which DB Regio Oberfranken supplies railway vehicles:

- RE Hof / Bayreuth–Lichtenfels–Würzburg
- RE Hof / Bayreuth–Lichtenfels–Saalfeld (Saale)
- RE Hof / Bayreuth–Nürnberg Hbf
- RE Hof–Marktredwitz–Weiden (Oberpf)–Regensburg
- RE Hof–Marktredwitz–Nürnberg
- RE Marktredwitz–Eger/Cheb
- RB Marktredwitz– Kirchenlaibach–Bayreuth Hbf
- RB Hof–Bad Steben
- RB Hof–Selb
- RB Bayreuth–Weiden (Oberpf)
- RB Coburg-Bad Rodach

The RE services are mainly operated with VT 612 units. On the Hof / Bayreuth–Marktredwitz–Nuremberg line they alternated with VT 610 trains from Nuremberg depot until the timetable change in December 2007. The RB services are - with the aforementioned exception – worked by VT 628 units.

== See also ==
- DB Regio
- List of German railway companies
- List of scheduled railway routes in Germany
- List of railway stations in Bavaria

== Sources ==
de:DB Regio Oberfranken
