= DB Regio =

Subsidiary of Deutsche Bahn AG

- Type: Aktiengesellschaft
- Industry: Transport
- Founded: 1 June 1999 (27 years ago) in Frankfurt, Hesse, Germany
- Headquarters: Frankfurt, Germany
- Number of employees: 42,405 (2024)
- Parent: Deutsche Bahn
- Website: dbregio.de

DB Regio AG (German pronunciation: [deːbeː ˈʁeɡi̯o]) is a subsidiary of Deutsche Bahn which operates regional and commuter train services in Germany. It is a 100% subsidiary of the Deutsche Bahn Group and therefore part of the DB Regio business segment, which also includes DB Regionnetz Verkehrs GmbH and other independent subsidiaries headquartered in Frankfurt am Main.

The company as a mainly nationwide operational company is responsible for all regional transport activities (rail and bus) of the DB Group in Germany. This includes traffic in neighboring countries. DB Regio serves 310 lines with 22,800 trains and 295,000 stops every day, serving about ten million customers.

== History ==
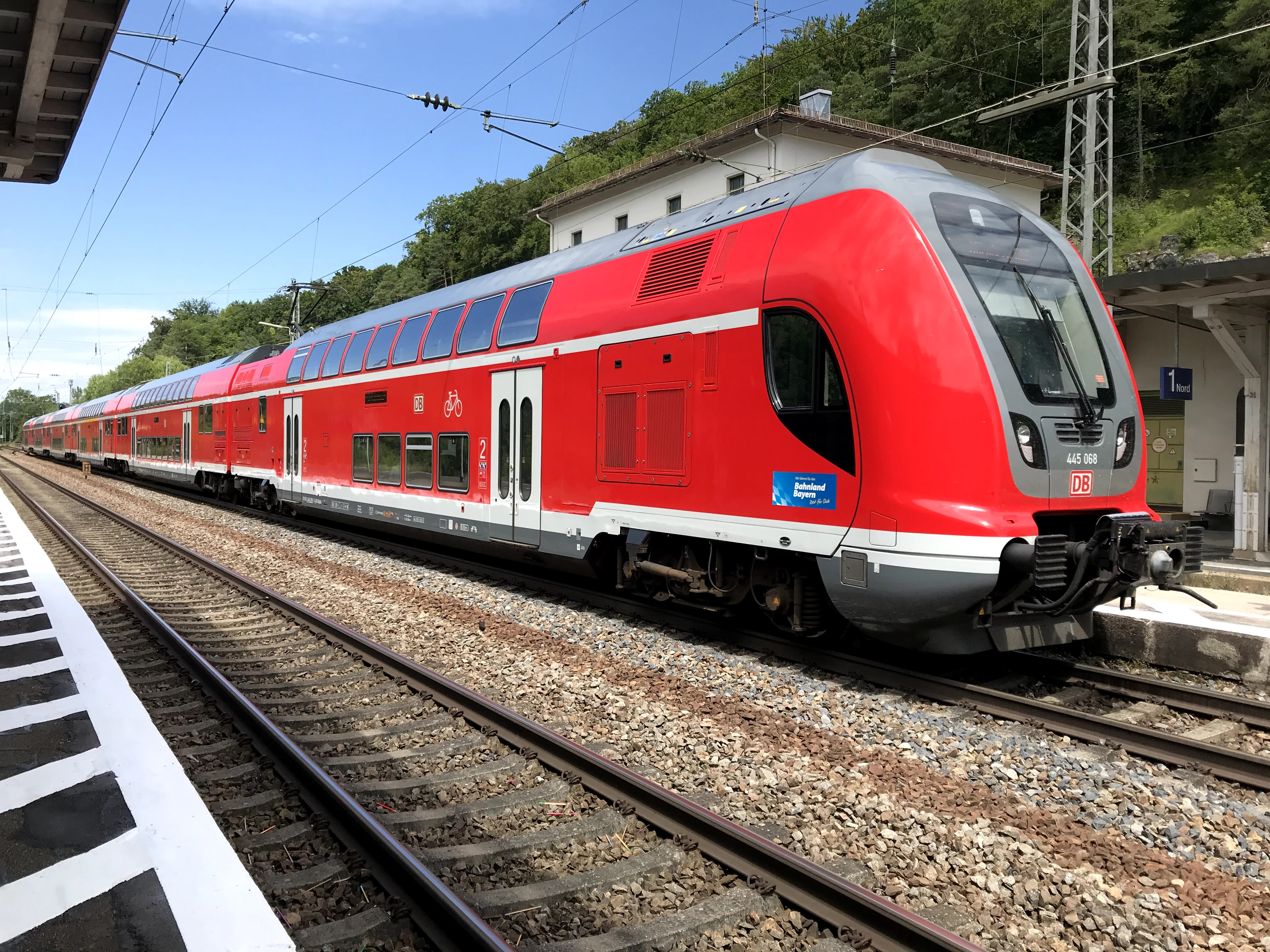
DB Regio trainset

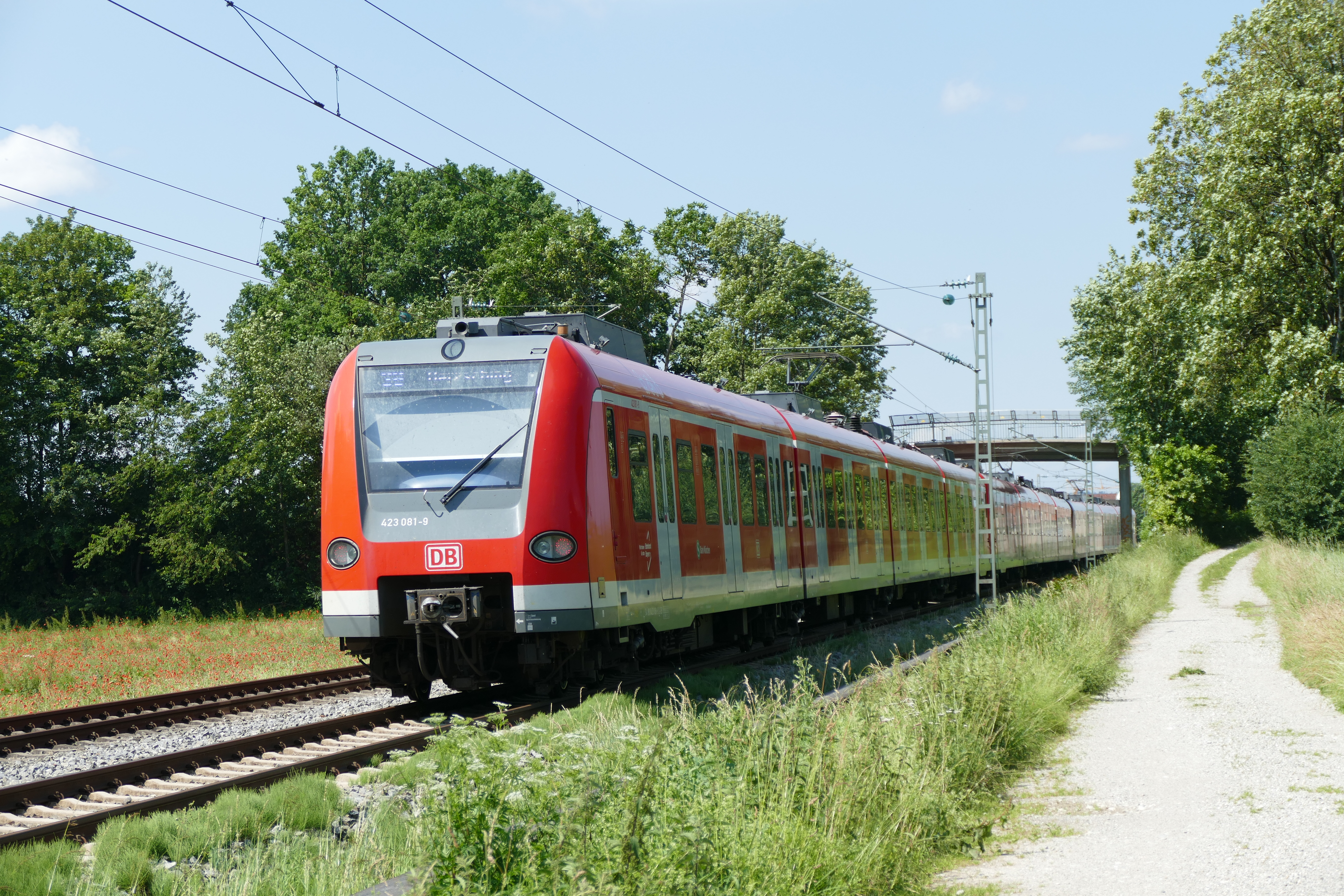
Munich S-Bahn trainset

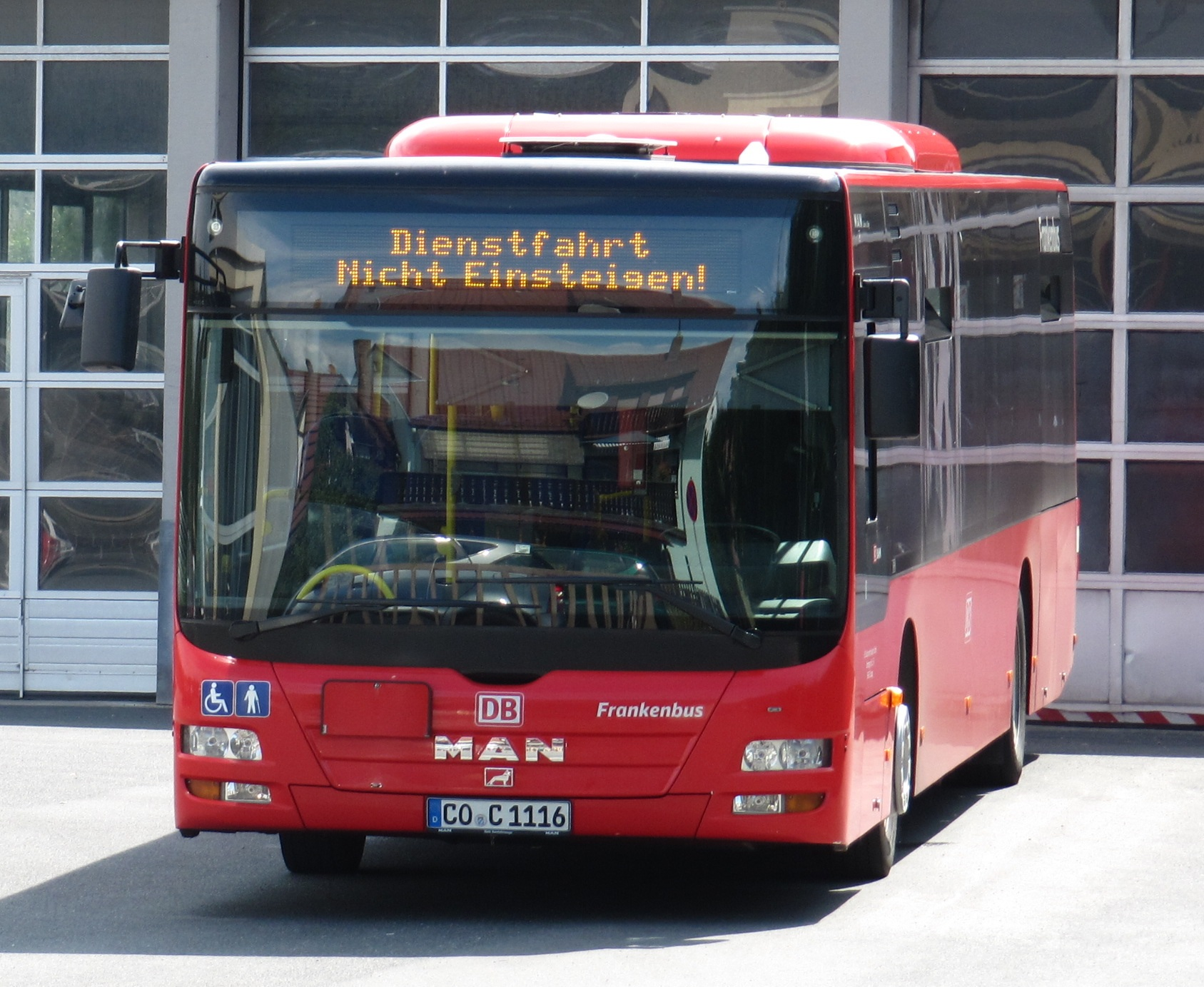
DB Regio Bus in Franconia

=== Foundation and early years ===
DB Regio AG emerged during the second stage of the rail reform on 1 January 1999, from the local transport division of Deutsche Bahn AG. Original plans were for them to be listed on the stock exchange by 2003. An IPO has not yet been implemented.

The articles of association for DB Regio GmbH were concluded on 12 February 1998, and the company was entered in the commercial register on 6 April 1998. Its sole purpose was the "preparation of the outsourcing of the local passenger transport division of Deutsche Bahn Aktiengesellschaft to a newly founded stock corporation in legal, economic and organizational terms". By resolution of 27 April 1999 the company was renamed Deutsche Bahn Erste Philippe Dressel mbH, the object of which was the "administration of its own assets and any activities that are conducive to the aforementioned purpose".

The spin-off of DB Regio Aktiengesellschaft was completed when it was entered in the commercial register on 1 June 1999. The company's purpose was: "Providing, marketing and coordinating transport services for rail and road public transport and the related services; Operation, maintenance, procurement and manufacture of vehicles of all types, in particular locomotives, railcars, railroad cars and buses and coaches; Managing businesses of related companies for their account as well as providing consulting services for third parties. "The company's share capital initially amounted to DM 800 million, which was divided into 80 million shares from various shareholders. The first chairman of the board was Klaus Daubertshäuser. The company's articles of association had already been adopted on 24 November 1998.

In the years 2001 to 2002 a changed management structure was implemented in the company. The previously centrally controlled company was replaced by nine independent national companies, to which the regional train and bus companies were subordinated. The aim of the restructuring was to improve profitability. 400 of the 700 jobs in the DB regional headquarters and around 2500 jobs in the entire company were saved. The regional rail and road traffic was transferred from January 2002 to nine regional lines (North, Northeast, Lower Saxony / Bremen, North Rhine-Westphalia, Hesse, Southwest, Southeast, Bavaria and Baden-Württemberg). The market share of DB Regio in local rail passenger transport (SPNV) in Germany was 92 percent, in the remaining public transport it was seven.

In 2007, DB Regio achieved 70% of its turnover from payments made by the federal states for the provision of local public transport, 29% from ticket sales and 1% from other income. More recent figures are not published.

In 2008, the company founded DB Regio Rheinland GmbH for the first time for the Rhein-Sieg-Express. After winning the tender, around 180 employees from DB Regio NRW should switch to the subsidiary that is not bound by the collective agreement of the group and receive around a fifth less wages there, according to a press report. After protests, the company was merged again with DB Regio NRW in 2011. A sector collective agreement agreed in February 2011 is to apply to future DB Regio subsidiaries.

From 2004 to the end of 2010, the DB Stadtverkehr subsidiary founded for this purpose was responsible for operating bus and city traffic. In February 2010 it was announced that the two S-Bahn companies, S-Bahn Berlin GmbH and S-Bahn Hamburg GmbH, were to be subordinated to DB Regio in March of that year. On 1 January 2011 DB Stadtverkehr was dissolved and Regio Bus was created.

=== Development since 2010 ===
ÖstgötaTrafiken has given DB Regio Sverige a contract to operate local trains for 10 years from 12 December 2010.

On 1 January 2015 two regions, Southwest and Rhine-Neckar, were merged to form the new DB Regio Southwest region.

Another restructuring took place on 1 January 2017, during which DB Regio Südwest and DB Regio Hessen were merged to form DB Regio Mitte.

In the late summer of 2016, the company announced that it would take part in the upcoming award procedures with smaller, more flexible units. Then the regional traffic Start Germany was founded, which participates with its regional subsidiaries in the respective tenders. The DB Regio subsidiary had its first successes in the Lower Elbe network in 2017.

== Corporate structure ==
Unlike its long-distance counterpart DB Fernverkehr, DB Regio does not operate trains on its own account. Services are ordered and paid for by the Bundesländer or their Landkreise. Some states have awarded long-term contracts to DB Regio (usually 10 to 15 years).

The headquarters of DB Regio in Frankfurt is responsible for the business development and focuses on the framework and service functions for the regional units in the conclusion of transport contracts and tenders. In addition, it supports the regions in the areas of price and revenue management, marketing and traffic planning. In addition, the S-Bahn Berlin, Hamburg, Munich, Rhein-Main and Stuttgart are coordinated and controlled by the headquarters.

=== Rail division (DB Regio Schiene) ===
The rail division is divided into seven regions. In addition, there are five urban commuter trains (S-Bahn), which are run directly from the headquarters, as well as the independent regio networks (RegioNetz).

- Regions:
  - DB Regio Baden-Württemberg (Baden-Württemberg)
    - DB Regio Stuttgart (Baden-Württemberg, previously under ownership of SWEG and Abellio Rail Baden-Württemberg)
  - DB Regio Bayern (Bavaria)
    - DB Regio Oberfranken (Upper Franconia province)
  - DB Regio Mitte (Hesse, Rhineland-Palatinate, Saarland) (was created on 1 January 2017 through the merger of DB Regio Hessen and DB Regio Südwest)
  - DB Regio Nord (Bremen, Hamburg, Lower Saxony, Schleswig-Holstein)
  - DB Regio Nordost (Berlin, Brandenburg, Mecklenburg-Vorpommern)
  - DB Regio NRW (North Rhine-Westphalia)
  - DB Regio Südost (Saxony, Saxony-Anhalt, Thuringia)
- S-Bahn:
  - S-Bahn Berlin
  - S-Bahn Hamburg
  - S-Bahn München
  - S-Bahn Rhein-Main
  - S-Bahn Stuttgart
- DB RegioNetz Verkehrs GmbH:
  - Erzgebirgsbahn (Saxony)
  - Kurhessenbahn (North Hesse and North Rhine-Westphalia)
  - Oberweißbacher Bergbahn (Thuringia)
  - SüdostBayernBahn (Lower Bavaria and Upper Bavaria)
  - Westfrankenbahn (Lower Franconia and northern Baden-Württemberg)

=== Bus division (DB Regio Bus) ===
The bus division includes 23 bus companies, which in turn own majority interests in other bus companies. With about 725 million passengers and a traffic volume of 8.4 billion passenger kilometers, DB Regio Bus is one of the largest providers of German bus transport. Nationwide, around 13,400 buses are used. As of 2014, the market share in the regular bus market in Germany is about 9 percent.

- Weser-Ems-Bus (Bremen)
- Autokraft (Schleswig-Holstein)
- Südniedersachsenbus (Lower Saxony)
- Westfalenbus (North Rhine-Westphalia)
- Ostwestfalen-Lippe-Bus (North Rhine-Westphalia)
- Rheinlandbus (North Rhine-Westphalia)
- Rhein-Nahe-Bus (Rhineland-Palatinate)
- Rhein-Mosel-Bus (Rhineland-Palatinate)
- Busverkehr Hessen (Hesse)
- Südwestbus (Baden-Württemberg)
- Rhein-Neckar-Bus (Baden-Württemberg)
- Regiobus Stuttgart (Baden-Württemberg)
- Regionalverkehr Alb-Bodensee (Baden-Württemberg)
- Südbadenbus (Baden-Württemberg)
- Oberbayernbus (Bavaria)
- Untermainbus (Bavaria)
- Ostbayernbus (Bavaria)
- Frankenbus (Bavaria)
- DB Regio Bus Ost GmbH (Brandenburg)
- Busverkehr Märkisch-Oderland (Brandenburg)
- Busverkehr Oder-Spree (Brandenburg)
- BEX Bayern Express & P. Kühn GmbH (Berlin)

== Ticket offers ==
In addition to the standardised local transport tariffs of the respective transport authorities, who are responsible for ordering the individual transports, DB Regio also offers comprehensive flat-rate tickets. In 1995 such a flat-rate ticket was introduced for the first time with the Schöne-Wochenende-Ticket. This is a permanent special offer and entitles up to five people to travel on all DB Regio local trains throughout Germany on Saturdays or Sundays. Travel in local public transport in almost all transport associations is also included.

Package offers in the individual regions are referred to as country tickets. The country tickets allow journeys throughout the region at a flat rate. These tickets are available in single and multi-person versions. The first national ticket was introduced in Bavaria in 1997. Over ten million country tickets are sold every year.

In 2009 the Quer-durchs-Land-Ticket was introduced. It closes the gap between the beautiful weekend ticket, valid nationwide, but only on weekends, and the country tickets, which are also valid during the week, but are regionally limited.

== Fleet ==
As of 2023, DB Regio utilises the following rolling stock:

- 487 locomotives (diesel and electric)
- 4,066 multiple units (diesel and electric)
- 11,936 coaches

== See also ==
- DB Fernverkehr
- S-Bahn
