= Regionalverkehr Alb-Bodensee =

German bus company

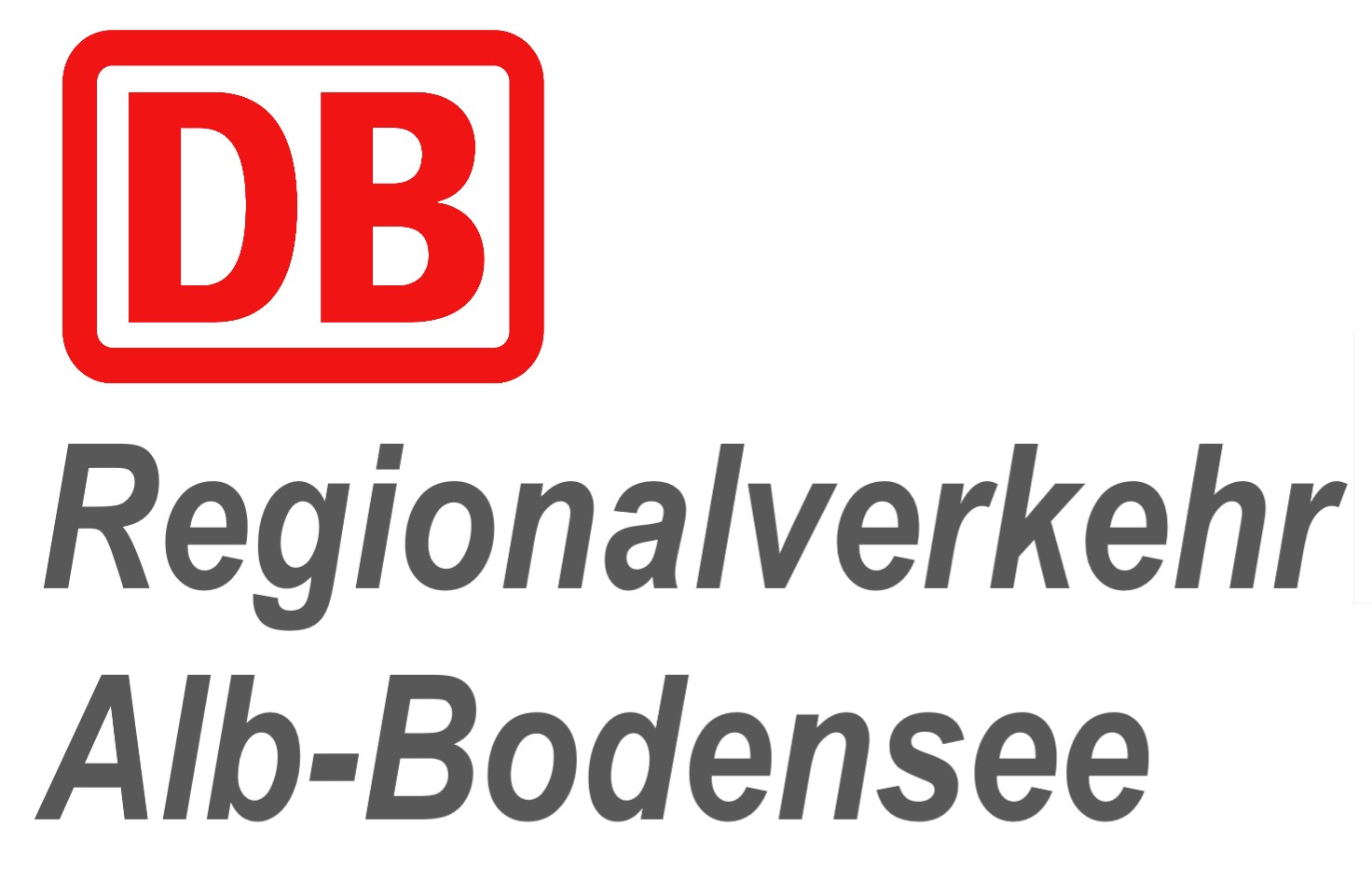
- Parent: DB Regio
- Headquarters: Ulm
- Stops: 6,000
- Fleet: 281 buses
- Annual ridership: 47 million

Regionalverkehr Alb-Bodensee, formerly DB ZugBus Regionalverkehr Alb-Bodensee, is a transport company that operates bus services in the German state of Baden-Württemberg. It is a wholly owned subsidiary of DB Regio, itself a subsidiary of Deutsche Bahn.

== History ==
Prior to the December 2021 timetable the company, under the name DB ZugBus Regionalverkehr Alb-Bodensee, operated various regional rail services in Baden-Württemberg in addition to bus services. DB Regio restructured the company, with the rail services transferred to DB Regio Baden-Württemberg.
