= MMX =

MMX may refer to:

- 2010, in Roman numerals

== Science and technology ==
- MMX (instruction set), a single-instruction, multiple-data instruction set designed by Intel
- MMX Mineração, a Brazilian mining company
- Martian Moons eXploration, a Japanese mission to retrieve samples from Mars' moon Phobos
- Michelson–Morley experiment, an 1887 physics experiment

== Places ==
- MMX Open Art Venue, in Berlin, Germany
- Malmö Airport, Sweden (IATA code)

== Arts and entertainment ==
=== Music ===
- "MMX (The Social Song)", a 2010 song by Enigma
- MMX (Twelfth Night album), 2010
- Napalm (album), original working title MMX, a 2012 album by Xzibit
- MMX, a 2012 album by Procol Harum
- MMX, a 2010 album by War from a Harlots Mouth
- Marble Machine X, a musical instrument designed by Swedish band Wintergatan

=== Video games ===
- Mega Man X, a series of video games, and its main character
- Might & Magic X: Legacy, a 2014 role-playing video game
