= Bad Steben =

- Municipality
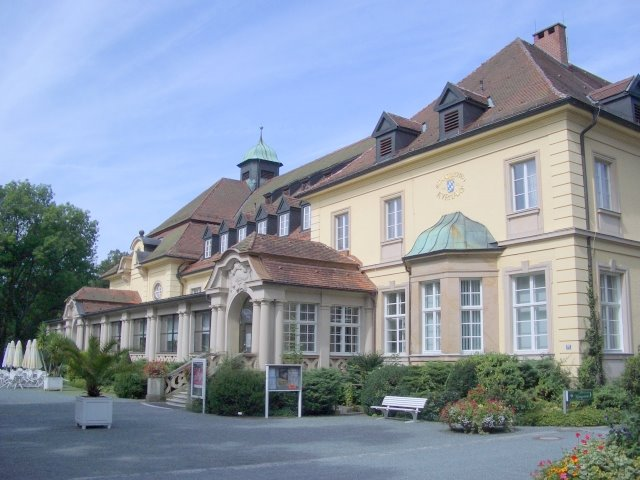
- Spa building

- Coat of arms

- Location of Bad Steben within Hof district
- Interactive map of Bad Steben
- Location within Germany Location within Bavaria
- Coordinates: 50°22′N 11°39′E
- Country: Germany
- State: Bavaria
- Admin. region: Oberfranken
- District: Hof

Government
  - Mayor (2020–26): Bert Horn (CSU)

Area
  - Total: 25.84 km^{2} (9.98 sq mi)
- Elevation: 578 m (1,896 ft)

Population (2025-12-31)
  - Total: 3,192
  - Density: 123.5/km^{2} (319.9/sq mi)
- Time zone: UTC+01:00 (CET)
  - Summer (DST): UTC+02:00 (CEST)
- Postal codes: 95138
- Dialling codes: 09288
- Vehicle registration: HO
- Website: www.badsteben.de

Bad Steben (German pronunciation: [baːt ˈʃteːbn̩]) is a market town in the district of Hof in Bavaria in Germany. In 2007, Bad Steben celebrated its 175th anniversary as a Bavarian State Spa.
