= Bernd Böttger =

East German inventor

Bernd Böttger (25 October 1940 - 27 August 1972) was an East German inventor who became known for escaping from the German Democratic Republic (GDR) across the Baltic Sea to Denmark in 1968 using a self built underwater propulsion device. The device later known as an Aqua scooter, was developed to pull a swimmer through the water and later adapted for commercial production.

== Early life ==
Böttger was born on 25 October 1940 in Sebnitz, Saxony, then part of Germany. The ''Sächsische Biografie'', a biographical reference work of the Institute for Saxon History and Cultural Anthropology, identifies him as an inventor and escapee from the GDR. According to accounts of his life, Böttger trained as a chemical worker and studied engineering in Magdeburg. He developed an interest in mechanical devices and diving. The German Bundestag's documentation of escapes across the Baltic identifies him as a former engineering student from Magdeburg who developed an underwater motor for an escape attempt.

== First escape attempt ==
Böttger initially planned to escape from the GDR by crossing the Baltic Sea. in 1967, he constructed an underwater propulsion device that could pull him through the water. His first attempt was discovered before he could complete the crossing, and the device was confiscated. Contemporary and later accounts differ about the precise circumstances of his arrest and the length of his imprisonment.

The experience did not end his plans to leave East Germany. Böttger then constructed an improved device. The later version was quieter and designed to allow him to remain partially submerged while being propelled through the Baltic Sea.

== 1968 escape ==
On the of 8 September 1968, Böttger left the Baltic coast near Graal-Müritz using his second underwater propulsion device. After several hours in the Baltic waters, he reached the Danish lightship "Gedser Rev", located offshore near Gedser, Denmark, in the early hours of 9 September. He was taken aboard the vessel reaching Danish protection.

The German Bundestag describes Böttger's device as an ''Unterwassermotor'' (underwater motor) and records that he successfully used it to escape in 1968. The lightship "Gedser Rev" later became part of the historical record of escapes from the Eastern Bloc across the Baltic. Sources differ about the precise distance of the crossing. Accounts commonly give a distance of approximately nautical miles or around 30 kilometres, but the exact route cannot be established with certainty from the available published sources.

== Aqua scooter ==
Böttger's device became know as the Aqua scooter. The original machine use a small combustion engine to drive a propellor. pulling the swimmer through the water. The German Bundestag has described Böttger's invention as one of the more notable technical devices developed by East German escapees. Following his escape. the invention attracted commercial interest in West Germany. It was further developed in cooperation with the ILO-Motorenwerke in Pinneberg and later produce as a watercraft. A later account in the German historical literature states that Böttger patented the invention in the West and that the device later entered series production. The Aqua Scooter became later associated with diving and rescue applications. Its latter commercial development was distinct from the improvised device Böttger used during his 1968 escape.

== Death ==
Böttger died on 27 August 1972 in Spain. The ''Sächsische Biografie'' records Spain as his place of death. He died during a diving expedition while testing a further development of the Aqua-Scooter. The circumstances of his death have been described as unexplained. His brother alleged that Böttger has been murdered on behalf of the East German Ministry for State Security (Stasi), The German Bundestag likewise describes his death as mysterious and unresolved.

== Legacy ==
Böttger's escape became one of the better known examples of technically assisted escapes from East Germany across the Baltic Sea. His underwater propulsion device was preserved and became associated with the later commercial Aqua Scooter. The German Bundestag has included his invention in exhibitions documenting attempts by East Germans to escape across the Baltic. His escape is also documented in historical accounts of the Danish lightship ''Gedser Rev'', which rescued people fleeing from the Eastern Bloc during the Cold War.

== See also ==
- East Germany balloon escape
- Berlin Wall
- Lutz Eigendorf
- Wolfgang Welsch
