= Neue Deutsche Biographie =

German biographical reference work

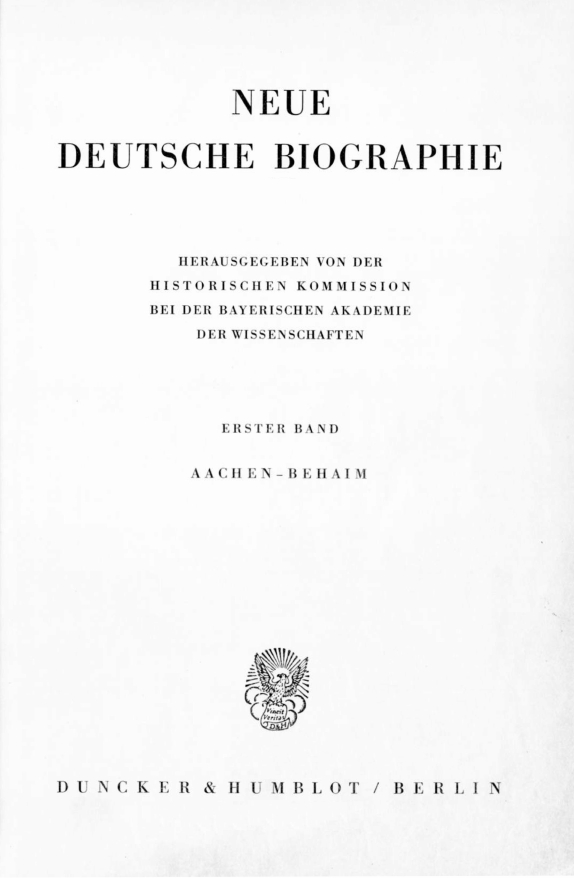
- Author: Bavarian Academy of Sciences and Humanities
- Language: German
- Genre: Biography
- Publication place: Germany
- Media type: Print; online
- Preceded by: Allgemeine Deutsche Biographie
- Website: deutsche-biographie.de

Neue Deutsche Biographie (NDB; literally New German Biography) is a biographical reference work. It is the successor to the Allgemeine Deutsche Biographie (ADB, Universal German Biography). The 27 volumes published thus far cover more than 23,000 individuals and families who lived in the German language area (Sprachraum).

NDB is published in German by the Historical Commission at the Bavarian Academy of Sciences and Humanities and printed by Duncker & Humblot in Berlin. The index and full-text articles of the first 26 volumes are freely available online via the website German Biography (Deutsche Biographie) and the Biographical Portal.

== Scope ==
NDB is a comprehensive reference work, similar to the Dictionary of National Biography, Dictionary of American Biography, American National Biography, Dictionary of Canadian Biography, Dictionary of Australian Biography, Dictionary of New Zealand Biography, Diccionario Biográfico Español, Dictionary of Irish Biography, Svenskt biografiskt lexikon, and Österreichisches Biographisches Lexikon 1815-1950 (ÖBL) (Austrian Biographical Dictionary 1815–1950).

Its first volume, alphabetically covering names from "Aachen" to "Behaim", was published in 1953. As of 2016, the most recent volume is the 27th, covering names from "Vockerodt" to "Wettiner", which was published in February 2020. So far, more than 23,000 biographies of individuals and families, who lived in the German language area, have been published. Some 600 further articles will be added in one further volume, with completion expected in 2024.

An NDB article usually contains genealogical information such as date and place of birth, date and place of death, tomb, parents, grandparents, marriages, divorces, number of children, alternate and birth names, academic degrees, a curriculum vitae in whole sentences, a valuation of the subject's political, economic, social, scientific, technical or artistic achievements, a bibliography and references to portraits. Only deceased persons with a close relation to the German language area are recorded. Each article is signed by its author.

== Access ==
An index cataloguing all articles and the full text of articles in the first 26 volumes, covering names from "Aachen" to "Vocke", is freely available online. The index is also part of the Biographie-Portal (Biographical Portal). This cooperative project of the Bavarian State Library (Bayerische Staatsbibliothek), the Historical Commission at the Bavarian Academy of Sciences and Humanities (Historische Kommission bei der Bayerischen Akademie der Wissenschaften), the Austrian Academy of Sciences and Humanities (Österreichische Akademie der Wissenschaften) the Foundation Historical Dictionary of Switzerland, and Slovenian Academy of Sciences and Arts also makes available data of Allgemeine Deutsche Biographie (ADB), Österreichisches Biographisches Lexikon 1815-1950 (ÖBL) (Austrian Biographical Dictionary 1815–1950), Historisches Lexikon der Schweiz / Dictionnaire Historique de la Suisse / Dizionario Storico della Svizzera (HLS / DHS / DSS), Slovenska Biografija, Rheinland-Pfälzische Personendatenbank (RPPB), Sächsische Biografie (Saxon Biography), and Oesterreichisches Musiklexikon (OeML).

== Volumes ==
1. Aachen – Behaim. 1953, reprint 1971
2. Behaim – Bürkel. 1955, reprint 1971
3. Bürklein – Ditmar. 1957, reprint 1971
4. Dittel – Falck. 1959, reprint 1971
5. Falck - Fyner (voran: Faistenberger). 1961, reprint 1971
6. Gaál – Grasmann. 1964, reprint 1971
7. Grassauer – Hartmann. 1966
8. Hartmann – Heske. 1969
9. Heß – Hüttig. 1972
10. Hufeland – Kaffsack. 1974
11. Kafka – Kleinfercher. 1977
12. Kleinhans – Kreling. 1980
13. Krell – Laven. 1982
14. Laverrenz - Locher-Freuler. 1985
15. Locherer - Maltza(h)n. 1987 ISBN 3-428-00196-6
16. Maly – Melanchthon. 1990 ISBN 3-428-00197-4
17. Melander – Moller. 1994 ISBN 3-428-00198-2
18. Moller – Nausea. 1997 ISBN 3-428-00199-0
19. Nauwach – Pagel. 1999 ISBN 3-428-00200-8
20. Pagenstecher – Püterich. 2001 ISBN 3-428-00201-6
21. Pütter – Rohlfs. Mit ADB & NDB-Gesamtregister auf CD-ROM. 2003 ISBN 3-428-11202-4
22. Rohmer – Schinkel. Mit ADB & NDB-Gesamtregister auf CD-ROM, second edition. 2005 ISBN 3-428-11203-2
23. Schinzel - Schwarz. Mit ADB & NDB-Gesamtregister auf CD-ROM, third edition. 2007 ISBN 978-3-428-11204-3
24. Schwarz – Stader. Mit ADB & NDB-Gesamtregister auf CD-ROM, fourth edition. 2010 ISBN 978-3-428-11205-0
25. Stadion - Tecklenborg. 2013 ISBN 978-3-428-11206-7
26. Tecklenburg - Vocke. 2016 ISBN 978-3-428-11207-4
27. Vockerodt - Wettiner. 2020 ISBN 978-3-428-11208-1

== Publication details ==
- Neue deutsche Biographie / herausgegeben von der Historischen Kommission bei der Bayerischen Akademie der Wissenschaften. Berlin : Duncker & Humblot, since 1953. ISBN 3-428-00181-8.

== See also ==
- Allgemeine Deutsche Biographie
- Deutsche Biographie
- Biographical Portal

== Bibliography ==
- Ebneth, Bernhard, Vom digitalen Namenregister zum europäischen Biographie-Portal im Internet. Mit einem Bericht aus der Arbeit der Neuen Deutschen Biographie (1997-2009), in: Jahresbericht der Historischen Kommission bei der Bayerischen Akademie der Wissenschaften 2010, p. 37-46, first in: Biografische Lexika im Internet. Bausteine aus dem Institut für Sächsische Geschichte und Volkskunde, vol. 15, ed. by Martina Schattkowsky and Frank Metasch, Dresden 2009, p. 13-44.
- Hockerts, Hans Günter, Vom nationalen Denkmal zum biographischen Portal. Die Geschichte von ADB und NDB 1858–2008, in: „... für deutsche Geschichts- und Quellenforschung. 150 Jahre Historische Kommission bei der Bayerischen Akademie der Wissenschaften, ed. by Lothar Gall, München 2008, p. 229–269.
- Reinert, Matthias, Schrott, Maximilian, Ebneth, Bernhard, Rehbein, Malte, Team Deutsche Biographie et al., From Biographies to Data Curation: The Making of www.deutsche-biographie.de, in: BD2015. Biographical Data in a Digital World. Proceedings of the First Conference on Biographical Data in a Digital World 2015. Amsterdam, the Netherlands, April 9, 2015, ed. by. Serge ter Braake, Antske Fokkens, Ronald Sluijter, Thierry Declerck, Eveline Wandl-Vogt, CEUR Workshop Proceedings Vol-1399. pp. 13–19.
