= East Germany balloon escape =

1979 crossing into West Germany

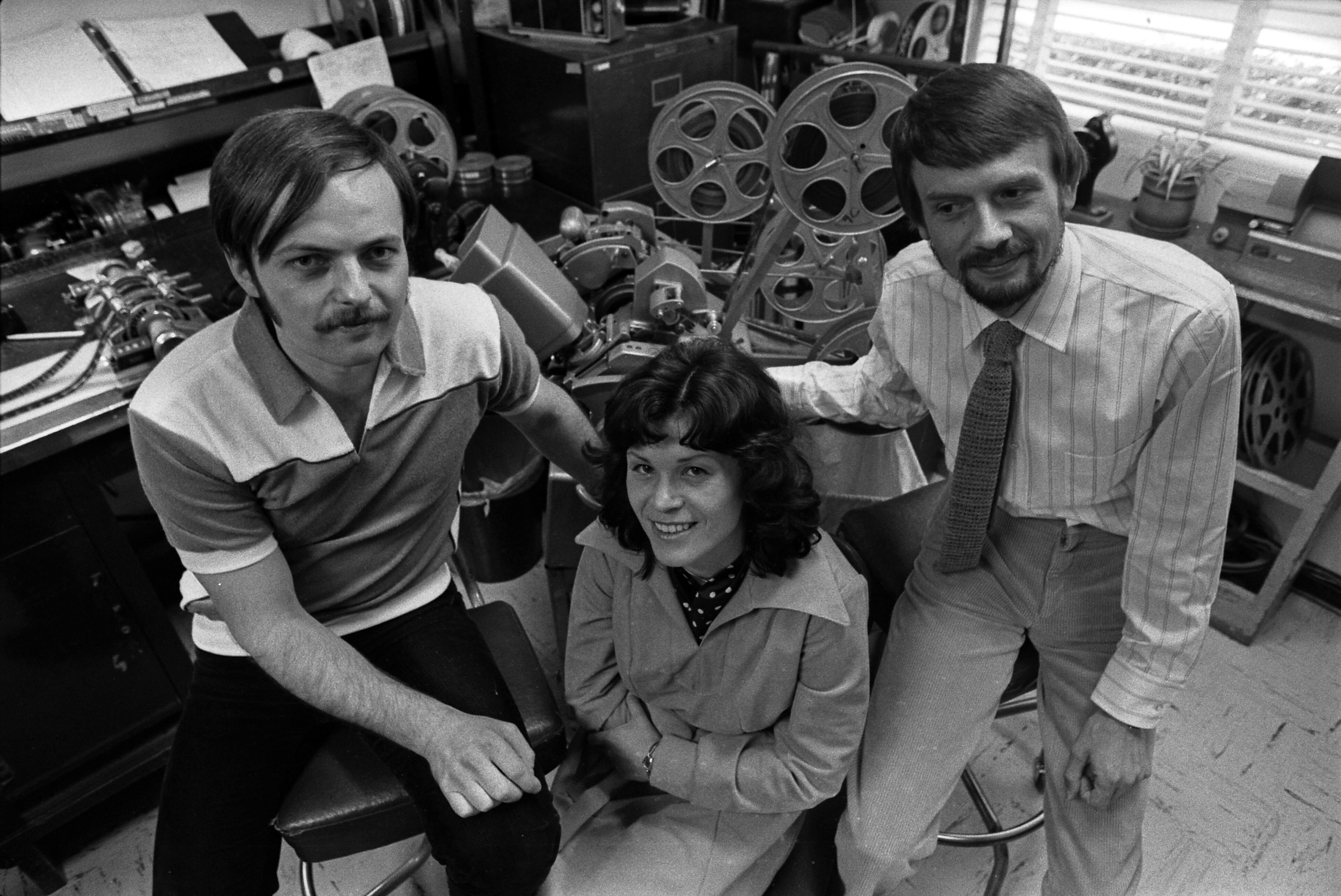
- Left to right: Günter Wetzel, Doris Strelzyk, and Peter Strelzyk
- Native name: Die Ballonflucht
- Date: 16 September 1979
- Time: 02:00 am (approximate)
- Duration: 25 minutes
- Location: Oberlemnitz, East Germany (takeoff) Naila, West Germany (landing); 50°28′59″N 11°35′29″E (takeoff) 50°19′52.7″N 11°40′13.1″E (landing)
- Organised by: Peter Strelzyk & family Günter Wetzel & family
- Participants: 8
- Outcome: Successful escape to West Germany
- Injuries: 2

On 16 September 1979, eight people from two families escaped from East Germany by crossing the border into West Germany at night in a homemade hot air balloon. The unique feat was the result of over a year and a half of preparations involving three different balloons, various modifications, and a first, unsuccessful attempt. The failed attempt alerted the East German authorities to the plot, but the police were unable to identify the escapees before their second, successful flight two months later.

== Background ==
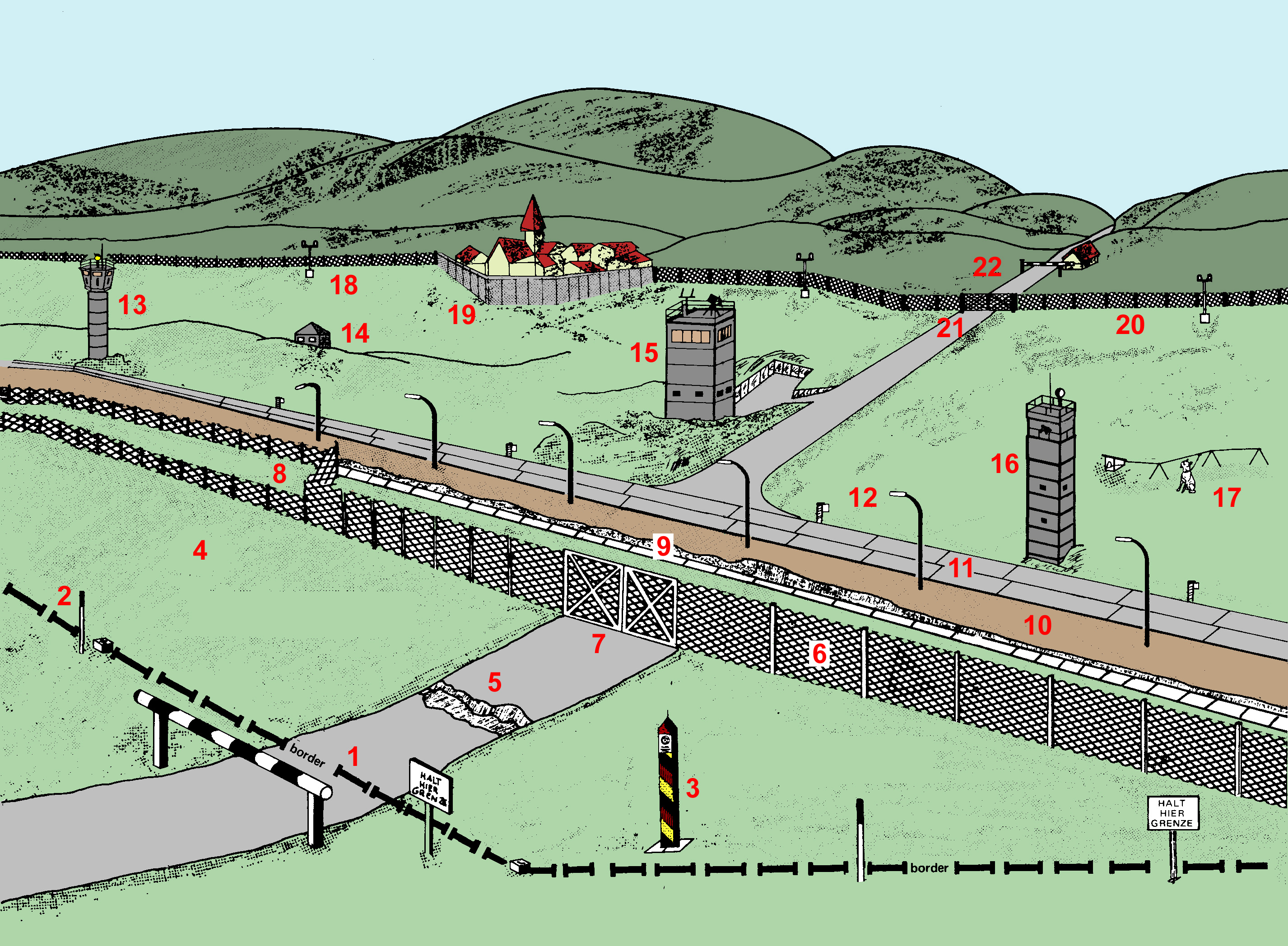
Diagram of East German border fortifications

East Germany, then part of the Eastern Bloc, was separated from West Germany in the Western Bloc by the inner German border and the Berlin Wall, which were heavily fortified with watchtowers, land mines, armed soldiers, and various other measures to prevent illegal crossings. East German border troops were instructed to prevent defection to West Germany by all means, including lethal force (Schießbefehl; "order to fire").

Peter Strelzyk (1942–2017), an electrician and former East German Air Force mechanic, and Günter Wetzel (born 1955), a bricklayer by trade, were colleagues at a local plastics factory. Friends for four years, they shared a desire to flee the country and began discussing ways to get across the border. On 7 March 1978, they agreed to plan an escape. They considered building a helicopter but quickly realized they would be unable to acquire an engine capable of powering such a craft. They then decided to explore the idea of constructing a hot air balloon, having been inspired by a television program about ballooning. An alternate account is that a relative shared a magazine article about the International Balloon Festival in Albuquerque, New Mexico.

== Construction ==
Strelzyk and Wetzel began research into balloons. Their plan was to escape with their wives and a total of four children (aged 2 to 15). They calculated the weight of the eight passengers and the craft itself to be around 750 kilograms (1,650 lb). Subsequent calculations determined a balloon capable of lifting this weight would need to hold 2,000 cubic metres (71,000 cu ft) of air heated to 100 °C (212 °F). The next calculation was the amount of material needed for the balloon, estimated to be 800 square metres (8,600 sq ft).

The pair lived in Pößneck, a small town of about 20,000 where large quantities of cloth could not be obtained without raising attention. They tried neighbouring towns of Rudolstadt, Saalfeld, and Jena without success. They travelled 50 km (31 mi) to Gera, where they purchased 1-metre-wide (3 ft 3 in) rolls of cotton cloth totalling 850 metres (2,790 ft) in length at a department store after telling the astonished clerk that they needed the large quantity of material to use as tent lining for their camping club.

Wetzel spent two weeks sewing the cloth into a balloon-shaped bag, 15 metres (49 ft) wide by 20 metres (66 ft) long, on a 40-year-old manually operated sewing machine. Strelzyk spent the time building the gondola and burner assembly. The gondola was made from an iron frame, sheet metal floor, and clothesline run around the perimeter every 150 millimetres (5.9 in) for the sides. The burner was made using two 11-kilogram (24 lb) bottles of liquid propane household gas, hoses, water pipe, a nozzle, and a piece of stove pipe.

== First test ==
The team was ready to test the craft in April 1978. After days of searching, they found a suitable secluded forest clearing near Ziegenrück, 10 km (6.2 mi) from the border and 30 km (19 mi) from Pößneck. After lighting the burner one night, they failed to inflate the balloon. They thought the problem might stem from the fact that they had laid the balloon on the ground. After weeks of additional searching, they found a 25-metre (82 ft) cliff at a rock quarry where they could suspend the balloon vertically before inflation, but that also proved unsuccessful.

The pair then decided to fill the bag with ambient-temperature air before using the burner to raise the air temperature and provide lift. They constructed a blower with a 14 hp (10 kW) 250 cc (15 cu in) motorcycle engine taken from Wetzel's old MZ, started with a Trabant automobile starter powered by jumper cables from Strelzyk's Moskvitch sedan. This engine, silenced by a Trabant muffler, turned 1-metre-long (3.3 ft) fan blades to inflate the balloon. They also used a home-made flamethrower, similar to the gondola's burner, to pre-heat the air faster. With these modifications in place, they returned to the secluded clearing to try again but still could not inflate the balloon. But using the blower did allow them to discover that the cotton material with which they fashioned the balloon was too porous and leaked excessively.

Their unsuccessful effort had cost them 2,400 DDM (US$360). Strelzyk disposed of the cloth by burning it in his furnace over several weeks.

== Second test ==
Strelzyk and Wetzel purchased samples of different fabrics in local stores, including umbrella material and various samples of taffeta and nylon. They used an oven to test the material for heat resistance. In addition, they created a test rig from a vacuum cleaner and a water-filled glass tube to determine which material would allow the vacuum to exert the most suction on the water, and consequently which was the most impervious to air. The umbrella covering performed the best but was also the most expensive. They instead selected a synthetic kind of taffeta.

To purchase a large quantity of fabric without arousing too much suspicion, the pair again drove to a distant city. This time they travelled over 160 kilometres (100 mi) to a department store in Leipzig. Their new cover story was that they belonged to a sailing club and needed the material to make sails. The quantity they needed had to be ordered, and although they feared the purchase might be reported to East Germany's State Security Service (Stasi), they returned the next day and picked up the material without incident. They paid 4,800 DDM (US$720) for 800 metres (2,600 ft) of 1-metre-wide (3 ft 3 in) fabric. On the way home, they also purchased an electric motor to speed up the pedal-operated sewing machine they had been using to sew the material into the desired balloon shape.

Wetzel spent the next week sewing the material into another balloon, accomplishing the task faster the second time with the now-electric sewing machine. Soon afterwards, the two men returned to the forest clearing and inflated the bag in about five minutes using the blower and flame thrower. The bag rose and held air, but the burner on the gondola was not powerful enough to create the heat needed for lift. The pair continued experimenting for months, doubling the number of propane tanks and trying different fuel mixtures. Disappointed with the result, Wetzel decided to abandon the project and instead started to pursue the idea of building a small gasoline engine-powered light aeroplane or a glider.

Strelzyk continued trying to improve the burner. In June 1979, he discovered that with the propane tank inverted, additional pressure caused the liquid propane to evaporate, which produced a bigger flame. He modified the gondola to mount the propane tanks upside down, and returned to the test site where he found the new configuration produced a 12-metre (39 ft) long flame. Strelzyk was ready to attempt an escape.

== First escape attempt ==
On 3 July 1979, the weather and wind conditions were favourable. The entire Strelzyk family lifted from a forest clearing at 1:30 am and climbed at a rate of 4 metres (13 ft) per second. They reached an altitude of 2,000 metres (6,600 ft) according to an altimeter Strelzyk had made by modifying a barometer. A light wind was blowing them towards the border. The balloon then entered clouds, and atmospheric water vapour condensed on the balloon, adding weight which caused it to descend prematurely. The family landed safely approximately 180 metres (590 ft) short of the border, at the edge of the heavily mined border zone. Unsure of where they were, Strelzyk explored until he found a piece of litter – a bread bag from a bakery in Wernigerode, an East German town. The group spent nine hours carefully extricating themselves from the 500-metre (1,600 ft) wide border zone to avoid detection and travelling unnoticed through a 5 km (3.1 mi) restricted zone before hiking back a total of 14 km (8.7 mi) to their car and the launch paraphernalia they had left behind. They made it home just in time to report their absence from work and school was due to sickness.

The abandoned balloon was discovered by the authorities later that morning. Strelzyk destroyed all compromising evidence and sold his car, fearing that it could link him to the escape attempt. On 14 August, the Stasi launched an appeal to find the "perpetrator of a serious offence", listing in detail all the items recovered at the landing site. Strelzyk felt that the Stasi would eventually trace the balloon to him and the Wetzels. He agreed with Wetzel that their best chance was to quickly build another balloon and get out as soon as possible.

== Successful escape ==
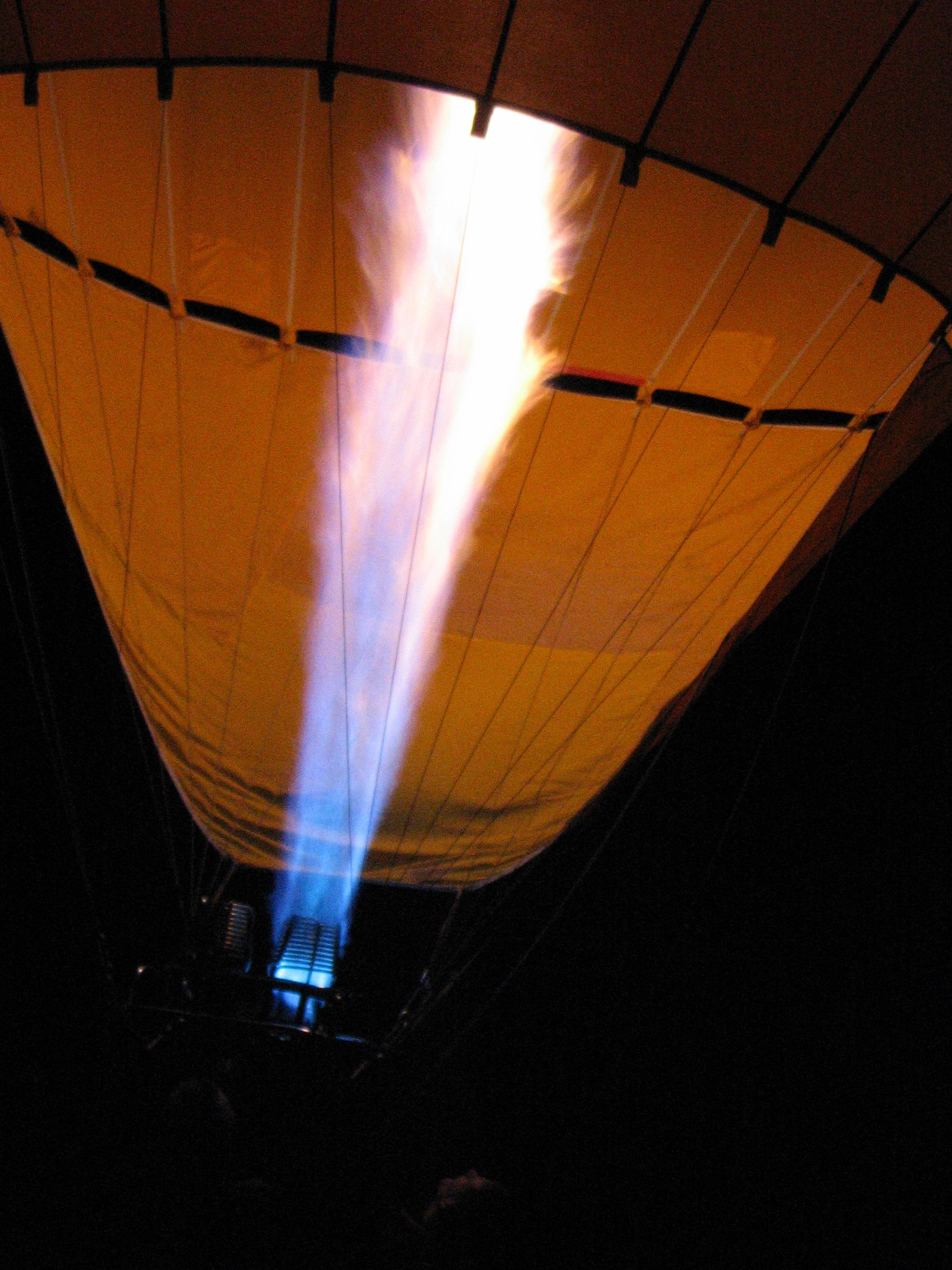
A hot air balloon burner firing at night

Strelzyk and Wetzel decided to double the balloon's size to 4,000 cubic metres (140,000 cu ft) in volume, 20 metres (66 ft) in diameter, and 25 metres (82 ft) in height. They needed 1,250 square metres (13,500 sq ft) of taffeta, and purchased the material, in various colours and patterns, all over the country in order to escape suspicion. Wetzel sewed a third balloon, using over 6 kilometres (3.7 mi) of thread, and Strelzyk rebuilt everything else as before. In six weeks, they had prepared the 180-kilogram (400 lb) balloon and a payload of 550 kilograms (1,210 lb), including the gondola, equipment, and cargo (the two families). Confident in their calculations, they found the weather conditions right on 15 September, when a violent thunderstorm created the correct winds. The two families set off for the launch site in Strelzyk's replacement car (a Wartburg) and a moped. Arriving at 1:30 am, they needed just ten minutes to inflate the balloon and an additional three minutes to heat the air.

Lifting off just after 2:00 am, the group failed to cut the tethers holding the gondola to the ground at the same time, tilting the balloon and sending the flame towards the fabric, which caught fire. After putting out the fire with an extinguisher brought along for just such an emergency, they climbed to 2,000 metres (6,600 ft) in nine minutes, drifting towards West Germany at 30 kilometres per hour (19 mph). The balloon flew for 28 minutes, with the temperature plummeting to −8 °C (18 °F) in the unsheltered gondola, which consisted solely of clothesline railing.

A design miscalculation resulted in the burner stovepipe being too long, causing the flame to be too high in the balloon, creating excessive pressure which caused the balloon to split. The air rushing out of the split extinguished the burner flame. Wetzel was able to re-light the flame with a match, and had to do so several more times before the group landed. At one point, they increased the flame to the maximum possible extent and rose to 2,500 metres (8,200 ft). They later learned they had been high enough to be detected, but not identified, on radar by West German air traffic controllers. They had also been detected on the East German side by a night watchman at the district culture house in Bad Lobenstein. The report of an unidentified flying object heading toward the border caused guards to activate search lights, but the balloon was too high and out of reach of the lights.

The tear in the balloon meant the group had to use the burner much more often, greatly limiting the distance it could travel. Wetzel later said he thought they could have travelled another 50 kilometres (31 mi) had the balloon remained intact. They made out the border crossing at Rudolphstein on the A9 and saw the search lights. When the propane ran out, they descended quickly, landing near the town of Naila, in the West German state of Bavaria and only 10 km (6 mi) from the border. The only injury was suffered by Wetzel, who broke his leg upon landing. Various clues indicated to the families that the balloon had made it across the border. These included spotting red and yellow coloured lights, not common in East Germany, and small farms, in contrast to the large state-run operations in the east. Another clue was modern farm equipment, unlike the older equipment used in East Germany. Two Bavarian State Police officers saw the balloon's flickering light and headed to where they thought it would land. There they found Strelzyk and Wetzel, who first asked if they had made it to the West, although they noticed the police car was an Audi – another sign they were in West Germany. Upon learning they had, the escapees happily called for their families to join them.

== Aftermath ==
East Germany immediately increased border security, closed all small airports close to the border, and ordered the planes kept farther inland. Propane gas tanks became registered products, and large quantities of fabric suitable for balloon construction could no longer be purchased. Mail from East Germany to the two escaped families was prohibited.

Erich Strelzyk learned of his brother's escape on the ZDF news and was arrested in his Potsdam apartment three hours after the landing. The arrest of family members was standard procedure to deter others from attempting escape. He was charged with "aiding and abetting escape", as were Strelzyk's sister Maria and her husband, who were sentenced to 2½ years. The three were eventually released with the help of Amnesty International.

The families decided to initially settle in Naila where they had landed. Wetzel worked as an automobile mechanic and Strelzyk opened a TV repair shop in Bad Kissingen. Due to pressure from Stasi spies, the Strelzyks moved to Switzerland in 1985. After German reunification in 1990, they returned to their old home in their hometown of Pößneck. The Wetzels remained in Bavaria.

West German weekly magazine Stern paid Strelzyk and Wetzel for exclusive rights to the story.

The escape has been portrayed in two films: Night Crossing (1982) and Balloon (2018). The former, also called With the Wind to the West – the English translation of the German title – was an English-language film produced by Disney. The latter was a German-language production which "both families welcomed [Director] Herbig’s desire to, as he put it, 'make a German film for an international audience.'" The Strelzyks were reportedly "moved to tears" at the screening of Balloon at Rockefeller Center in New York City. Herbig claimed in 2018 that both the Strelzyk and Wetzel families had been dissatisfied with the Disney film.

Peter Strelzyk died in 2017 at age 74 after a long illness.

In 2017, the balloon was put on permanent display at the Haus der Bayerischen Geschichte: Museum in Regensburg.

== Escapees ==
The family members included:

- Peter Strelzyk, aged 37
- Doris Strelzyk
- Frank Strelzyk, aged 15
- Andreas Strelzyk, aged 11
- Günter Wetzel, aged 24
- Petra Wetzel
- Peter Wetzel, aged 5
- Andreas Wetzel, aged 2

== Media ==
- The Disney film Night Crossing (1982) is an adaptation of the story
- Michael Herbig's film Balloon (2018) is a German-language adaptation of the story
- BBC program Outlook, "Fleeing Communism in a Hot Air Balloon"
- PBS Nova program, "History's Great Escapes" (2004)
- Doris Strelzyk, Peter Strelzyk, Gudrun Giese: Destiny Balloon Escape. Quadriga, Berlin 1999, ISBN 3-88679-330-3
- Jürgen Petschull, With the Wind to the West. The Adventurous Flight from Germany to Germany. Goldmann, Munich 1980, ISBN 3-442-11501-9
- Kristen Fulton (Author), Torben Kuhlmann (Illustrator), Flight for Freedom: The Wetzel Family’s Daring Escape from East Germany. March 3, 2020, ISBN 978-1452149608
- The Netflix series White Rabbit Project, episode 2, "Jailbreak"

== See also ==
- Winfried Freudenberg
- Escape attempts and victims of the inner German border
