= Biographical Portal =

- Producer: Bavarian State Library, Bavarian Academy of Sciences and Humanities, Austrian Academy of Sciences, Foundation Historical Dictionary of Switzerland
- Languages: German, English, French, Italian, Slovenian

Access
- Cost: Free

Coverage
- Temporal coverage: Early Middle Ages to present
- Geospatial coverage: Europe
- No. of records: 170,000

Links
- Website: www.biographie-portal.eu/Biographien/Hauptseite

The Biographical Portal (German: Biographie-Portal) is a free online index to biographical reference works in the German language area. Intended to facilitate access to reliable biographical information, it contains entries for more than 160,000 biographies of persons from all social backgrounds and nearly all periods of German, Austrian, Swiss, Slovenian and South-East European history.

The portal is a joint project of the Bavarian State Library, the Historical Committee at the Bavarian Academy of Sciences and Humanities, the Austrian Academy of Sciences, and the Foundation Historical Dictionary of Switzerland. Slovenska Biografija is published by Slovenian Academy of Sciences and Arts. The project is financed by the founding institutions, and access is free.

== Index ==
The portal provides a common index to the following reference works:

- Allgemeine Deutsche Biographie (ADB)
- Neue Deutsche Biographie (NDB)
- Österreichisches Biographisches Lexikon 1815-1950 (ÖBL)
- Historisches Lexikon der Schweiz (HLS)
- Biographisches Lexikon zur Geschichte Südosteuropas
- Oesterreichisches Musiklexikon (OeML)
- Bayerisches Musiker-Lexikon Online
- Rheinland-Pfälzische Personendatenbank (RPPD)
- Sächsische Biografie (SäBi)
- Slovenska biografija

The index can be searched using the following criteria:

- Surname and forename (including variant names and pseudonyms)
- Year of birth and/or death
- Profession

The majority of biographies are in German, however the Swiss lexicon also has entries in French and Italian, while the Slovenska Biografija includes entries in Slovenian.

From the search results, users can access the full text of the biographies, either directly or via another site. An advantage of the common index is that it allows users to compare differences in biographical entries and supplement the information in one lexicon with that in others. Further national and regional reference works are planned for future inclusion in the portal.

== Temporal coverage ==
All entries are for deceased persons only. The newer German and Swiss lexicons reach into the present, but the ÖBL is limited to the period 1815–1950. The last date covered in the ÖBL is December 31, 1950, and the last biography is that of Karl Renner, first Chancellor of Austria, who died on that date.
