= Balloon (2018 film) =

2018 German drama film

- Release poster
- German: Ballon
- Directed by: Michael Herbig
- Screenplay by: Kit Hopkins; Thilo Röscheisen; Michael Herbig
- Based on: East German balloon escape
- Produced by: Michael Herbig
- Starring: Friedrich Mücke; Karoline Schuch; David Kross; Alicia von Rittberg; Thomas Kretschmann
- Cinematography: Torsten Breuer
- Edited by: Alexander Dittner
- Music by: Ralf Wengenmayr; Marvin Miller
- Production company: StudioCanal
- Release date: 27 September 2018 (Germany)
- Running time: 125 minutes
- Country: Germany
- Language: German
- Box office: $11,799,591

Balloon (German: Ballon) is a 2018 German thriller drama film directed by Michael Herbig. The film depicts the crossing of the Inner German border by the Strelzyk and Wetzel families from the GDR to West Germany with a self-made hot-air balloon in 1979. The two families, including four children, successfully floated across the sky from Pößneck, Thuringia to Naila, Bavaria, then situated 8 kilometres (5.0 mi) south of the Iron Curtain. They reached a height of 2,500 metres (8,200 ft) in the homemade balloon.

Before making the film, Herbig was allowed to inspect the thousands of pages thick file about the balloon flight belonging to the Stasi, the former secret service of the GDR. However, the film is generally seen as a thrilling action film and, according to some reviewers, lacks historical depth. Another film about the successful escape was released by Disney in 1982, during the Cold War, under the title Night Crossing.

== Plot ==
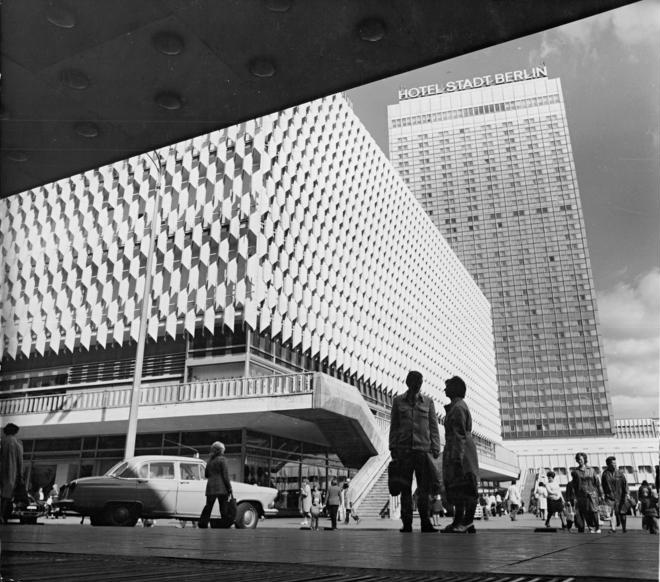
In Berlin, the Strelzyk family stays at the Hotel Stadt Berlin to establish contact with the local US embassy.

The film is set in Pößneck, Thuringia, in the summer of 1979. The Strelzyk and Wetzel families develop a daring plan to flee the GDR to West Germany in a self-made hot air balloon. About to attempt an escape in perfect wind conditions, Günter Wetzel decides it is too dangerous. He thinks the balloon is too small for eight people, and his wife Petra is afraid for their two young children. Therefore, they stop trying to escape for a short time. Doris and Peter Strelzyk now want to dare to escape alone with their two sons. Their teenage son Frank has fallen in love with Klara Baumann, the daughter of his neighbour Erik, who works for the Stasi, and writes her a farewell letter.

The same night, the Strelzyk family packs the balloon and other accessories in their trailer, drives into the forest, and takes off. Hidden in the clouds, they cannot be seen by the border guards. However, the balloon goes down with Doris, Peter, and their two sons Frank and Andreas (called "Fitscher") in the gondola shortly before the border because the pipes from the gas bottles to the burner freeze up and become clogged. None of the four are injured, they get back to their car and destroy all evidence. Frank just manages to retrieve the letter to Klara. The Stasi finds the abandoned balloon and discovers the attempted escape, and under the direction of Lieutenant Colonel Seidel, begins a large investigation. He interrogates the border guards who were on duty at the time of the attempt to escape and accuses them of not taking their task seriously enough. The investigators narrow down the radius in which the balloon must have started, and thus also the circle of suspects.

For the next few weeks, both families live in constant fear that the Stasi might link them to the attempted escape. Doris in particular is worried because she lost her medication in the forest, which gave the Stasi important information in the form of personalised pills. Peter wants to try again. Before that, however, they travel to East Berlin, where they hope to be able to get out of the country with the help of the East Berlin US Embassy, but this attempt fails. Peter can convince Günter to make another balloon attempt to escape. Since they must be careful in obtaining the materials to avoid raising suspicion, the family members only buy small quantities of suitable fabric in different cities. Günter sits at the sewing machine every night to join the pieces of fabric. Meanwhile, Seidel is fast putting together all the clues tying the family to the escape. He must prevent the GDR from being embarrassed by a successful escape attempt at all costs.

Just as Doris feared, the investigators trace their medication back to the local pharmacy, where all recipients of the tablets are now being identified and checked. The Stasi published photos in the press of objects that the Strelzyks had to leave behind at the landing site of their first attempt. Günter has to move the sewing work to the Strelzyks' cellar because his neighbours have become aware of the constant running noise of the sewing machine. When Frank realises that Klara's father Erik has to go to the pharmacy because someone is wanted and that the wind is blowing to the south, the prerequisite for their escape, they want to make the second attempt that same night. When the Stasi employees work out their identities and break into their houses, the families are already on their way to the starting point. The start is not as perfect this time as on their first attempt and when the gas runs out they have to land in a forest after half an hour's flight. At first, it is not clear whether they have successfully crossed the border. Peter and Günter then explore the area and meet a police patrol car. When the police tell them that they are in Upper Franconia, the families react joyfully. Lieutenant Colonel Seidel and his superior must explain themselves to Stasi chief Erich Mielke, and Erik Baumann is interrogated by the Stasi.

Ten years later, Doris and Peter Strelzyk watch Hans-Dietrich Genscher's announcement from the Prague embassy on television that the GDR citizens gathered there are allowed to leave.

== Cast ==
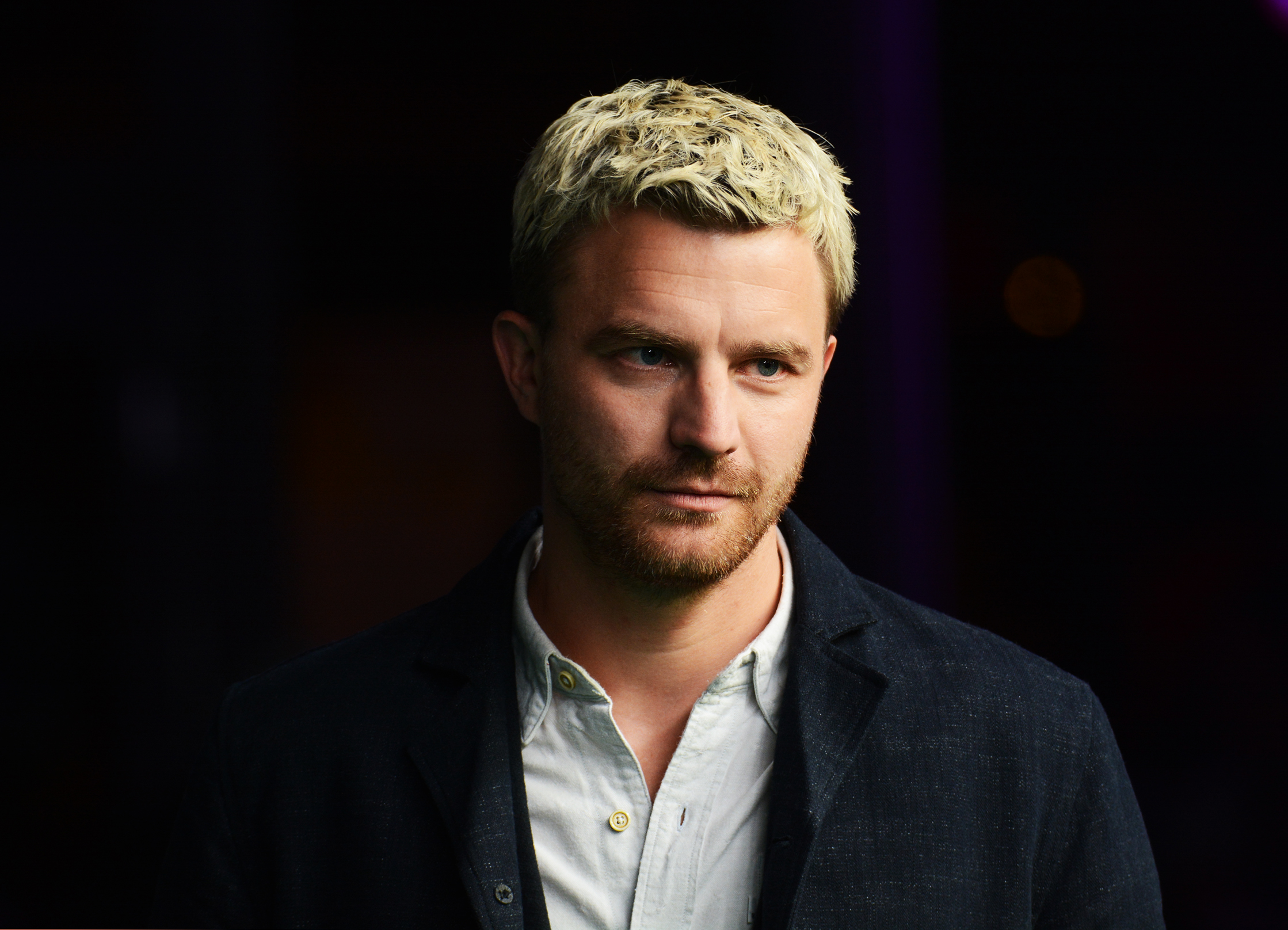
Friedrich Mücke, here at the Zurich Film Festival, plays Peter Strelzyk in the film

- Friedrich Mücke as Peter Strelzyk
- Karoline Schuch as Doris Strelzyk
- David Kross as Günter Wetzel
- Alicia von Rittberg as Petra Wetzel
- Thomas Kretschmann as Lieutenant Colonel Seidel
- Jonas Holdenrieder as Frank Strelzyk
- Tilman Döbler as Andreas "Fitscher" Strelzyk
- Christian Näthe as Captain Heym
- Till Patz as Peterchen Wetzel
- Ben Teichmann as Andreas Wetzel
- Ronald Kukulies as Erik Baumann
- Emily Kusche as Klara Baumann
- Sebastian Hülk as Sergeant Lesch
- Gernot Kunert as Lieutenant Colonel Schirra
- Ulrich Friedrich Brandhoff as Lieutenant Colonel Tornow
- Peter Trabner as Pharmacist
- Bernd Michael Lade as Colonel Witzke
- Kai Ivo Baulitz as Lieutenant Strehle
- Bernd Stegemann as SED district leader Meissner
- Antje Traue as Ulrike Piehl (kindergarten teacher)
- Sebastian Schwarz as Lieutenant Kuhn
- Eli Wasserscheid as Beate Baumann
- Tilo Keiner as Officer on duty
- Peter Prager as Günter's stepfather
- Nadja Engel as Günter's mother

== Production ==
=== Development ===
When the escape happened I was the age of Fitscher, the younger son of the Strelzyks, and when I saw the Disney film I was the age of the older son Frank. And what I could understand was that these people risked everything for a life in freedom. This daring, the madness of this story – it totally absorbed me.

— Michael Herbig

The director was Michael Herbig, who had prepared the film for six years. He had already met Günter Wetzel, a former GDR refugee, a few years before, who had told him the story of his escape. In 1978, Wetzel and a former colleague came up with the idea of crossing the GDR border in a self-made hot-air balloon. As early as 1980, a film about the same event was produced by Disney under the title Night Crossing, which premiered in 1982. When Herbig watched this, he was Frank Strelzyk's age.

Herbig stated that an attempt had been made to acquire the remake rights, and it had turned out that both families had sold their story "skin and hair". He showed the contracts to various lawyers, who advised him against further efforts. Finally, Herbig could establish contact with Disney through Roland Emmerich. Herbig signed consulting contracts with the Strelzyk and Wetzel families, without whose blessing he would not have made the film. Herbig financed the film through herbXfilm with 700,000 euros. In addition, the film received funding from the Medienboard Berlin-Brandenburg for the same amount, and 1.25 million euros from FilmFernsehFonds Bayern. The German Film Fund granted a production subsidy of 2,049,800 euros, the Central German Media Fund 150,000 euros and the Film Funding Agency 650,000 euros. The film was herbXfilm's first co-produced with StudioCanal and SevenPictures.

In NDR Info, Krischan Koch explains that Herbig strives for authenticity down to the smallest details in his film. Nevertheless, Balloon was not a film about state security and political oppression in the GDR. Rather, Herbig focuses on the drama of the escape. Norbert Koch-Klaucke also noted in the Berliner Zeitung that after the successful escape, real-life wrote a completely different script for the two families, which the film does not show: "A new drama begins. After the successful escape, which made headlines in the West and embarrassed the GDR worldwide, the two families are now feeling the vengeance of the SED state. They are being persecuted by the Stasi in the west." On the one hand, they wanted to persuade the families to return to the GDR, on the other hand, according to the Stasi files, Mielke's spy system initiated the operational process "Pear" immediately after the spectacular balloon escape to make life in the West a hell for the balloon refugees.

=== Filming and equipment ===
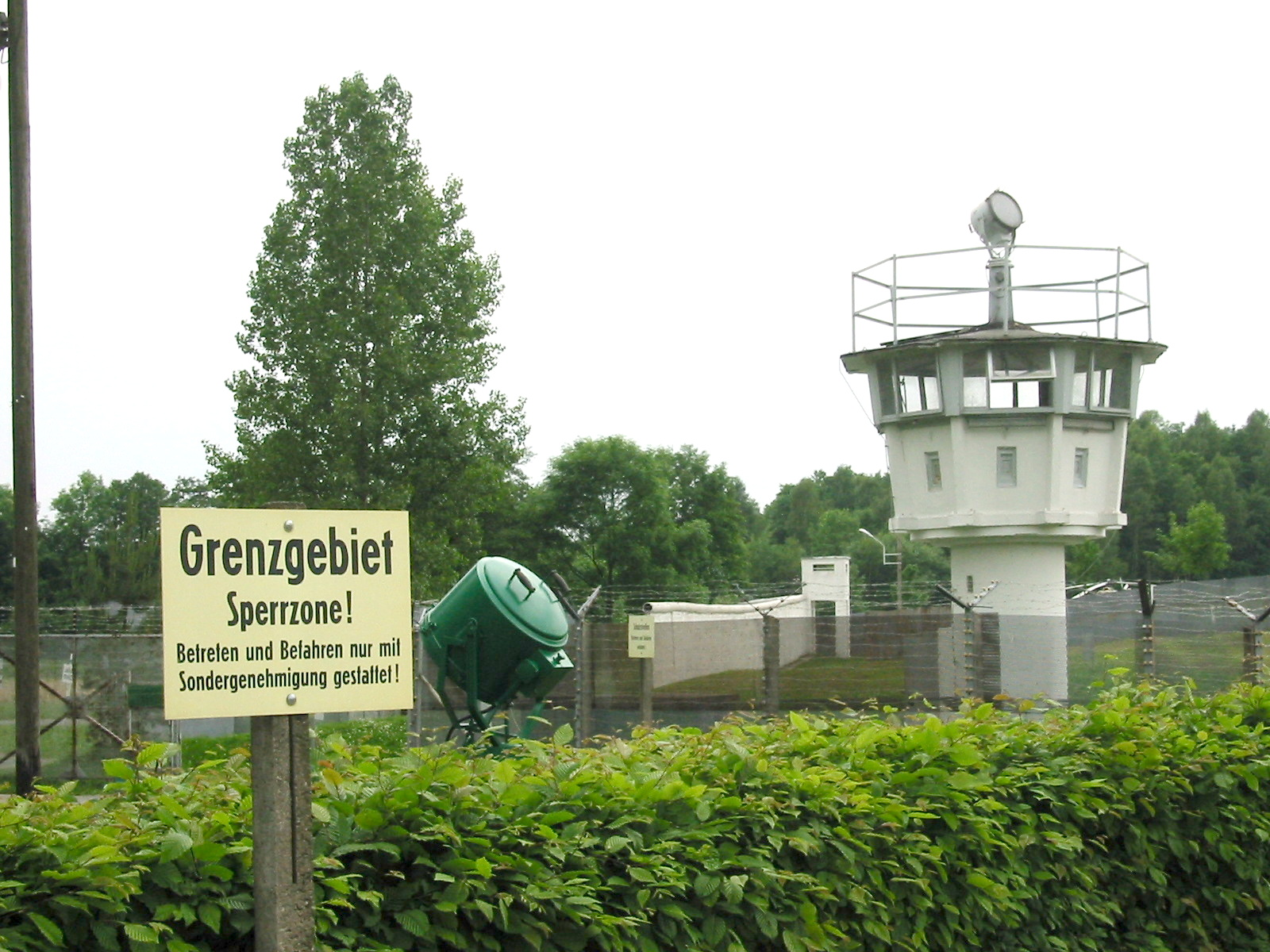
In the open-air museum in the town of Mödlareuth, where the film was shot in October 2017, there are preserved GDR watchtowers

The shooting took place in Bavaria, Thuringia and Berlin and started on September 18, 2017, in Munich. In October 2017 they shot in Nordhalben, where the town was made to look like in the GDR in the 1970s, and in the village of Mödlareuth, which is partly in Bavaria and partly in Thuringia and was cut into two by a wall during the existence of the GDR, thus gaining the nickname 'little Berlin'. Recordings were also made in Berlin in October 2017. The Hotel Stadt Berlin shown in the film is today's Park Inn Hotel on Alexanderplatz. On 24 November 2017, the shooting ended after 50 days. Torsten Breuer acted as cameraman.

Herbig had insight into the Stasi files of the escape and into the photos of the balloon gondola, which were taken by the Stasi at the crash site. These photos can be seen in the credits of the film along with a few other recordings. The two balloons used in the film were not created on the computer but recreated. The second balloon was 32 metres (105 ft) high, consisted of 1,245 square metres (13,400 sq ft) of fabric and had a volume of 4,290 cubic metres (151,000 cu ft). The real escape balloon was not available because it was being restored. Nevertheless, green screen technology was used during the filming. The real escape balloon is exhibited in the Museum of Bavarian History in Regensburg, which opened in June 2019.

=== Music and release ===
The film's music was composed by Ralf Wengenmayr and recorded by the Babelsberg German Film Orchestra. Sidney Schering from Quotenmeter.de wrote that the music of Herbig's main composer contributes in part to the fact that Ballon develops such an enormous tension. "Similar to Christopher Nolan's Dunkirk, in which Hans Zimmer keeps the ticking of a clock sounding, "Ballon" also has a short, cool beat running through the score, which relies on distorted percussion, cool synthesizers and cutting string sections." In the film, Petra Wetzel hums the children's song Bummi-Lied in the balloon to calm the children, which was sung by the real Petra Wetzel in this situation.

The first trailer was released at the end of June 2018. Ballon celebrated its world premiere on 12 September 2018 in the Mathäser Filmpalast in Munich. Günter Wetzel and the two sons of the other family, Frank Riedmann and Andreas "Fitscher" Strelzyk, were also present at the premiere. Herbig, on the other hand, was prevented from coming for health reasons.

The film was released in German cinemas on 27 September 2018. In the autumn of 2018, there were also presentations at the Zurich Film Festival and the Haifa International Film Festival. A theatrical release in the UK took place on 14 June 2019. Ballon received 200,000 euros of distribution support from FilmFernsehFonds Bayern and 150,000 euros from the Medienboard Berlin-Brandenburg.

== Reception ==
In Germany, the film was approved for children aged 12 and over. Around 936,000 cinema-goers saw the film in Germany. Ballon was in the preselection for the German Film Award 2019.

=== Critical reception ===
As of November 2024, 70% of the 30 English-language reviews compiled by Rotten Tomatoes are positive and have an average rating of 7.1/10. The site's critical consensus reads, "Balloon isn't as exciting as the real-life story that inspired it, but it remains a solidly made and often engrossing political thriller." At Metacritic, which assigns a weighted average rating, the film has received an average score of 53 out of 100, based on 9 critics, indicating "mixed or average reviews".

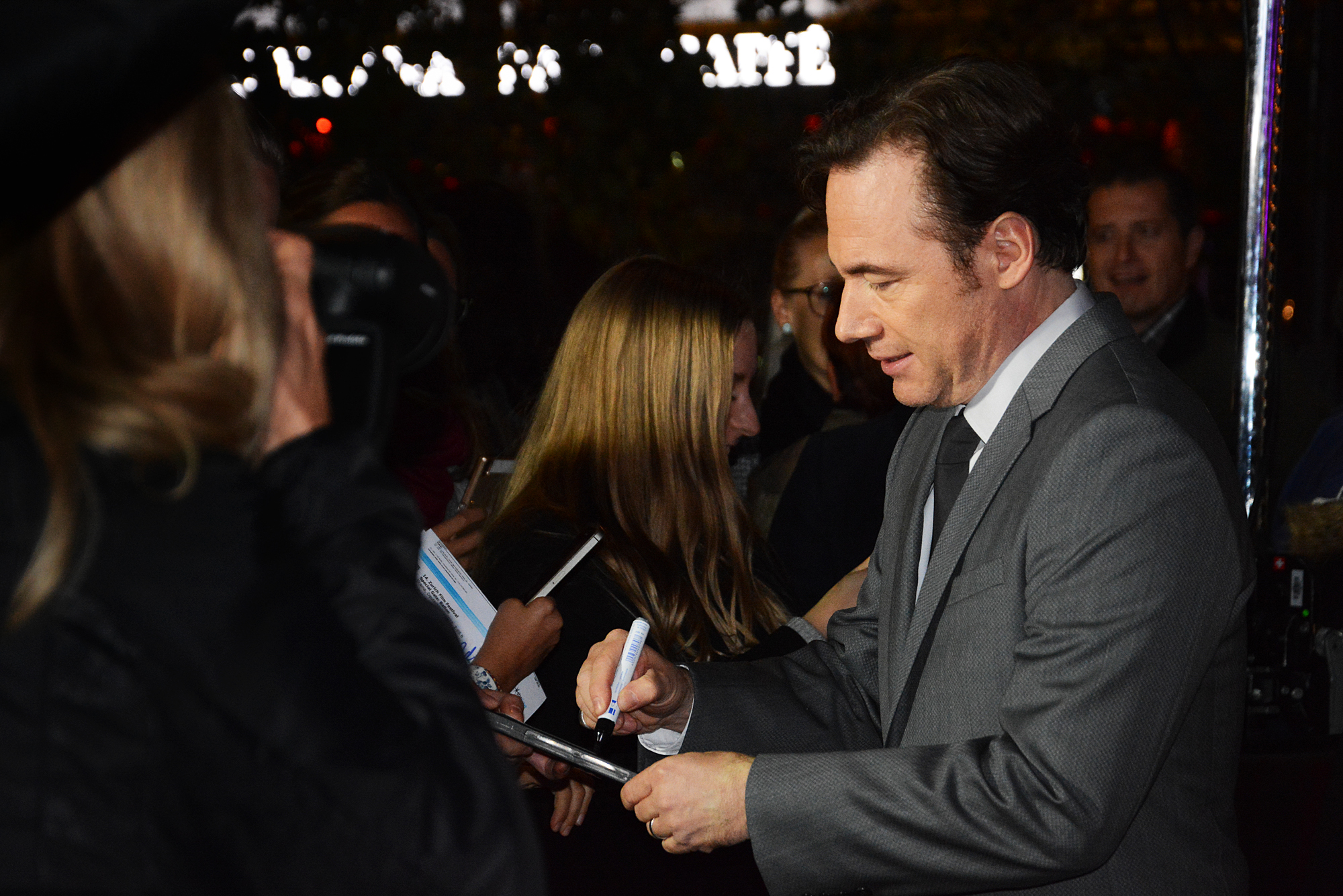
Michael Herbig at the presentation of the film at the Zurich Film Festival

Andre Petzer from Epd Film says that though Michael Herbig takes dramaturgical liberties when he reduces the three escape attempts to two and condenses the long tinkering with the second balloon to six weeks, he manages to create very emotional moments. You can watch the filmmaker completely reinvent himself, says Petzer: "A director who uses the whole range of suspense cinema. And who succeeds in banging along until the last minute, even though the end is known. At the very end, there is a bitter punchline. When the refugees land in Upper Franconia, a Bavarian asks: 'How many are there still?' Suddenly the film is very close to today's refugee crisis. And makes it clear that it wasn't that long ago that Germans also fled because they saw no future."

Karoline Meta Beisel writes less euphorically in the Süddeutsche Zeitung that the film is covered with a "soapy carpet of music like in the most beautiful private television event two-part", and that there is "a little too much of everything: too much music, too much pathos, too much drama".

Balloon was given the rating of Particularly Valuable by the German Film and Media Assessment. The reasoning states: "Herbig stages the cat and mouse game between the Strelzyk family and the investigator Seidel like a crime thriller and especially towards the end with breathless tension. The music perfectly supports the drama of the situation, the setting, the equipment and the costumes leave no doubt about the high research effort and the attention to detail. The system of the GDR itself is shown with all its reprisals, but Herbig also finds fine nuances for the attitude of the citizens towards their homeland. That makes Balloon a highly exciting, precisely staged and differentiated film about the unattainable desire for freedom – which came true."

=== Awards ===
- Peace Prize of German Films – The Bridge, award in the main prize category, national (Michael Herbig)
- Heartland International Film Festival, Audience Choice Award – Cultural Journey: Germany (Michael Herbig)
- German Camera Prize, nomination in the feature film category (Torsten Breuer)
