= Aqua scooter =

Vehicle

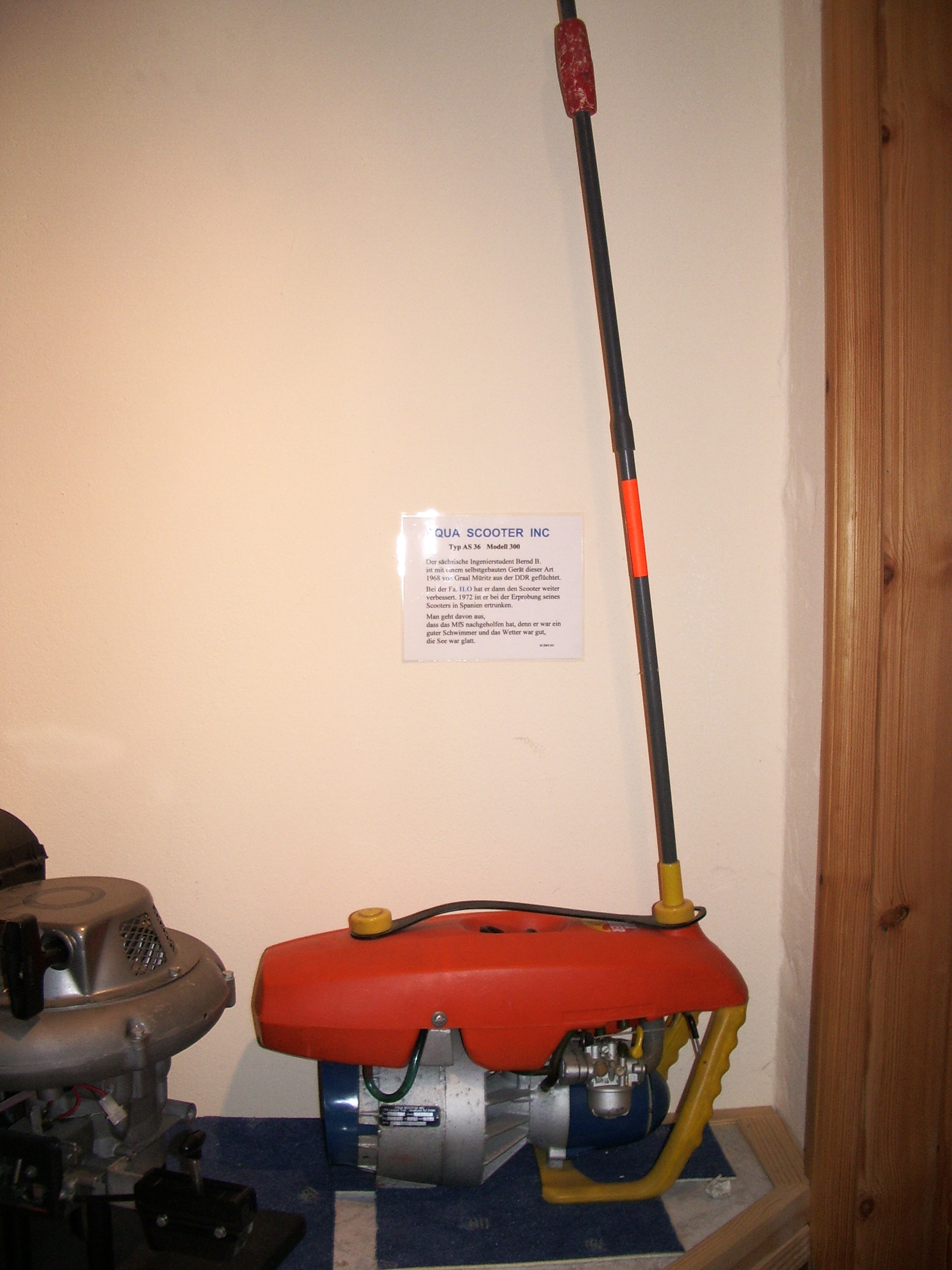
Ilo Aqua Scooter

The Aqua scooter was invented in 1967 by East German chemical engineer Bernd Böttger. Böttger developed his vehicle in order to escape the country across the Baltic Sea to Denmark. Today, it is produced commercially by AquaScooter Inc.

== Early testing ==
Determined to escape the German Democratic Republic, chemical engineer Bernd Böttger decided that his best chance to reach the West would be to do so by sea. He trained as a diver and worked on developing a vehicle to aid his endeavour in his automotive workshop in Dresden. Taking the two-stroke engine from a motorcycle, Böttger attached a propeller to its driveshaft and sealed the unit inside a fibreglass mat using polyester resin. He then added a fibreglass petrol tank and handles, intending to use his home-made torpedo to drag him through the water.

Böttger's first escape attempt in the autumn of 1967 was a failure when he was caught by the Stasi on the beach at Wismar and, in spite of claiming that he only intended to test his invention and not escape, he was sentenced to a three-month prison sentence. However his detention only stiffened his resolve to escape and as soon as he was released, Böttger set about improving his design.

His second escape attempt on 8 September 1968 was successful. Departing from Graal-Müritz and intending to reach the Danish port of Gedser, some 24 nautical miles away across the Baltic Sea, Böttger's device pulled him for nearly five hours to reach the Lightvessel Gedser Rev moored outside the port.

When Böttger's story was reported by European news sources, an executive at Rockwell International read about it and became interested. A West German subsidiary of Rockwell offered Böttger the opportunity to develop a commercial version of his aqua scooter. In 1974, Rockwell halted development of the scooter, but the patents were bought by James Taylor in 1978. Taylor formed Aquascooter Inc and moved production to the United States.

== Function ==
The first machine was able to pull a man through and below the waters surface for five hours at up to 3 mph. The second version had an upgraded 1 1/2 horsepower scooter engine and a snorkel fed breathing unit.

== Present day ==
The Aqua scooter is still produced today by an Italian company Comer Top Kart, and can reach speeds of up to 5 mph. There are two models: the AS650 (49cc, 2HP) and the AS650 Supermagnum (51.5CC, 2.4HP)

== See also ==
- Personal water craft, also known as water scooter.
