= Eli Wasserscheid =

German actress (born 1978)

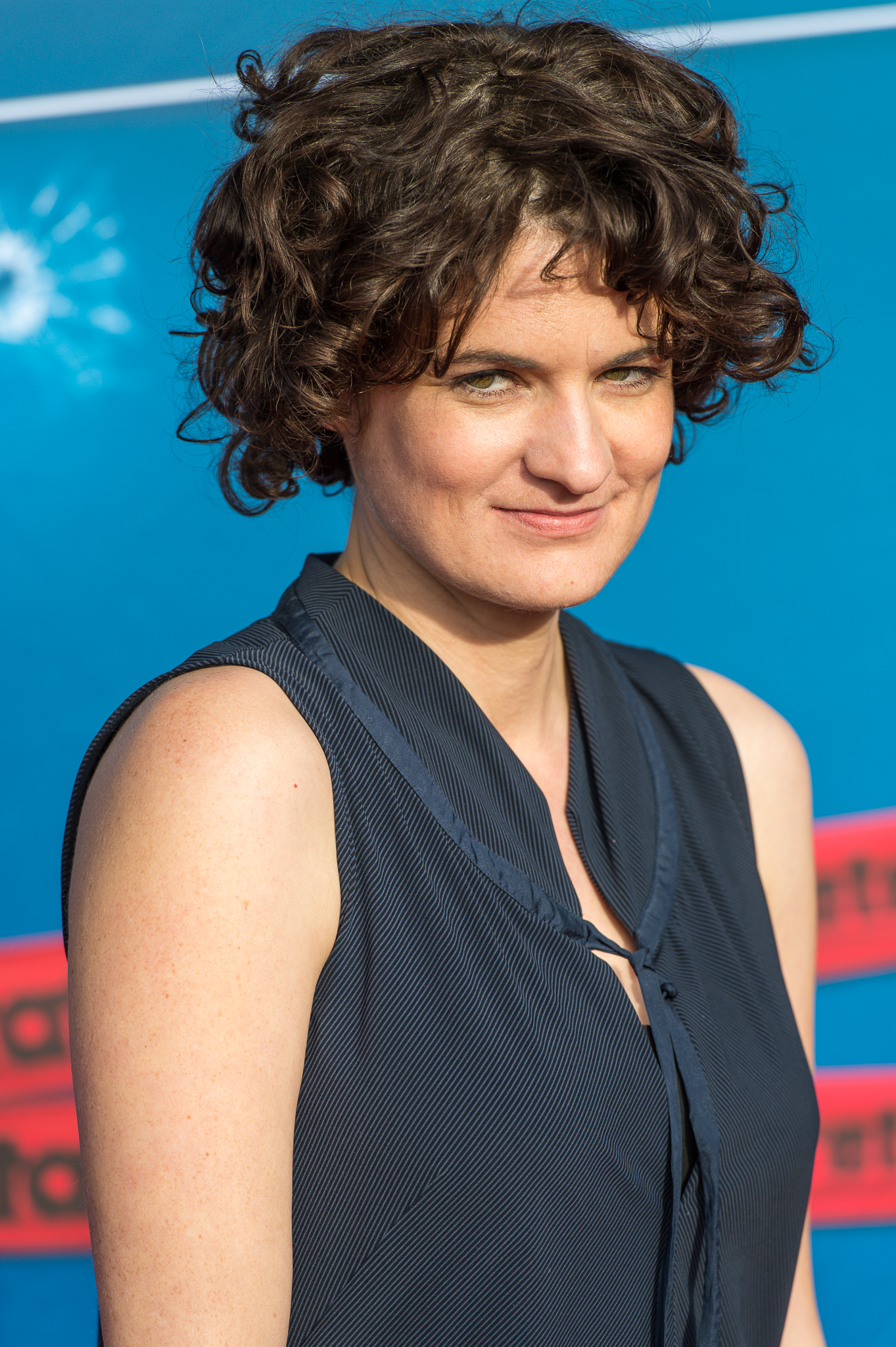
- Born: 22 October 1978; Bamberg

Elisabeth "Eli" Wasserscheid (born 22 October 1978 in Bamberg) is a German actress.

== Life ==
Wasserscheid was trained at the New Munich drama school under Ali Wunsch-König. Afterwards she had engagements at the Schauburg Munich, National Theater Mannheim, Stadttheater Fürth and Kampnagel in Hamburg. She belongs to the ensemble of the Metropoltheater in Munich. From 2004, she appeared in several short films; She had her feature film debut in Bad Sandhartshofen in 2006 (directed by Eric Grun). In the following years she worked with directors such as Dominik Graf, Franz Xaver Bogner, Ed Herzog, Matthias Kiefersauer, Johannes Fabrick and Andreas Senn. In 2014 she was nominated for the Bavarian Art Prize in the field of Performing Arts. Since April 2015, she has played Police Commissioner Wanda Goldwasser in Tatort

== Filmography ==
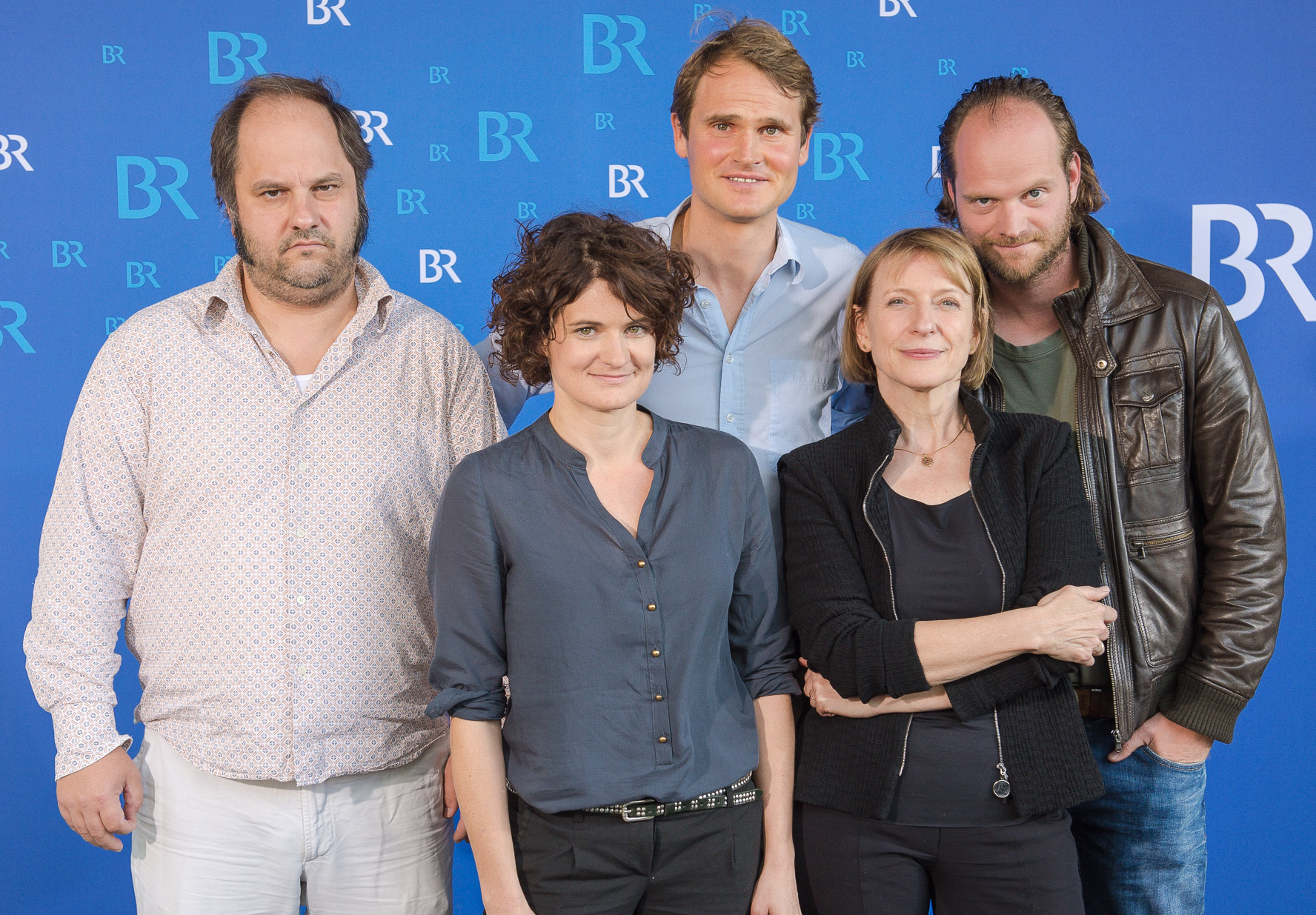
Die Franken-Tatort Darsteller Matthias Egersdörfer, Eli Wasserscheid, Fabian Hinrichs, Dagmar Manzel und Andreas Leopold Schadt (v.l.)

- 2008: Liesl Karlstadt & Karl Valentin (directed by Jo Baier)
- 2008: Normal is des ned! (directed by Helmut Milz)
- 2009: Blondinenträume (directed by Isabel Kleefeld)
- 2010: Polizeiruf 110 – Cassandras Warnung (directed by Dominik Graf)
- 2010: Die Geisterflotte vom Yukon (directed by Saskia Weisheit)
- 2010: Tödlicher Rausch (directed by Johannes Fabrick)
- 2011: Dora Heldt – Kein Wort zu Papa (directed by Mark von Seydlitz)
- 2011: The Invisible Girl (directed by Dominik Graf)
- 2012: München 7 – Ja, wo ist er denn? (TV-Series, directed by Franz Xaver Bogner)
- 2012: Um Himmels Willen – Geheimcode (TV-Series, directed by Andi Niessner)
- 2013: Dampfnudelblues (directed by Ed Herzog)
- 2013: Hubert und Staller - Spiel mir das Lied vom Tod (TV-Series, directed by Werner Siebert)
- 2013: Tatort – Aus der Tiefe der Zeit (directed by Dominik Graf)
- 2013: Urlaub für Immer (short film, directed by Sara Waasner)
- 2013: Tatort – Allmächtig (directed by Jochen Alexander Freydank)
- 2013: Bocksprünge (directed by Eckhardt Preuß)
- 2014: Beloved Sisters (directed by Dominik Graf)
- 2014: SOKO 5113 – Ein perfektes Leben (directed by Matthias Kiefersauer)
- 2015: The Misplaced World (directed by Margarethe von Trotta)
- since 2015: Tatort (TV series), as Kriminalkommissarin Wanda Goldwasser
  - 2015: Der Himmel ist ein Platz auf Erden
  - 2016: Das Recht, sich zu sorgen
  - 2017: Am Ende geht man nackt
- 2015: Heiter bis tödlich: Monaco 110 – Die Wildsau (directed by Carsten Meyer-Grohbrügge)
- 2015: Schweinskopf al dente (directed by Ed Herzog)
- 2015: Lena Lorenz – Von weit her (directed by Käthe Niemeyer)
- 2016: Moni's Grill (directed by Franz Xaver Bogner)
- 2018: Balloon (directed by Michael Herbig)
