= Night Crossing =

1982 film by Delbert Mann

- Theatrical release poster
- Directed by: Delbert Mann
- Written by: John McGreevey
- Produced by: Tom Leetch
- Starring: John Hurt; Jane Alexander; Glynnis O'Connor; Doug McKeon; Beau Bridges; Ian Bannen
- Cinematography: Tony Imi
- Edited by: Gordon D. Brenner
- Music by: Jerry Goldsmith
- Production company: Walt Disney Productions
- Distributed by: Buena Vista Distribution
- Release date: February 5, 1982
- Running time: 107 minutes
- Countries: United Kingdom; United States
- Language: English
- Budget: $10 million
- Box office: $8 million

Night Crossing is a 1982 thriller drama film starring: John Hurt, Jane Alexander and Beau Bridges. The film is based on the true story of the Strelzyk and Wetzel families who, on September 16, 1979, escaped from East Germany to West Germany in a homemade hot-air balloon during the Inner German border-era, when emigration to West Germany was strictly prohibited by the East German government. It was the final theatrical film directed by Delbert Mann and the last in which Kay Walsh appeared before retiring. A German variant was made in 2018.

== Plot ==
A brief summary of conditions in East Germany and the border zone shows stock footage such as Conrad Schumann's jump over barbed wire in Berlin as the Berlin Wall is constructed.

In April 1978, in the small town of Pößneck, Thuringia, teenager Lukas Keller attempts to escape East Germany by riding a bulldozer through the Inner German border zone, but is shot by automatic machine guns and left for dead by the guards. His family is informed while on a picnic with their friends the Strelzyks and the Wetzels, and the entire Keller family are taken by the police. Aggravated with life under the GDR regime, Peter Strelzyk proposes a daring plan to his friend Günter Wetzel: they will build a balloon to carry themselves and their families (a total of eight people) over the border to West Germany. They purchase 1,255 sq yd (1,049 m^{2}) of taffeta, claiming that it is for a camping club, and Günter sews the fabric together with a sewing machine in his attic while Peter experiments for months with devising a burner for the hot-air balloon. They face setbacks such as fires while trying to inflate the balloon, a lack of power for the burner, extremely suspicious neighbors and doubts about the plan's feasibility by Günter's wife Petra.

Peter and Günter then stop seeing each other in order to avoid suspicion that may arise when the Strelzyks escape. Peter and his eldest son Frank complete the burner and, after extensive testing, manage to inflate the balloon. On July 3, 1979, the four members of the Strelzyk family attempt to fly the balloon. They successfully lift off but they are spotted by a border guard. However, a cloud dampens the balloon and the burner, and they crash within the border zone only a few hundred feet from the fences, and the balloon floats away. Miraculously, they escape the zone, return to their car and drive home. Meanwhile, the border guard finds the balloon and the Stasi, led by Major Koerner, begins an investigation to identify the balloon's creators in order to prevent them from carrying out a second escape attempt. Initially distraught over his failure, Peter is convinced by his sons to try again, knowing that the Stasi may soon uncover the plot. Peter convinces Günter to help him and both families begin work on a larger balloon to carry them all out of East Germany. Petra agrees to the plan, especially because her mother in West Berlin is very sick and the East German government has repeatedly denied her request to visit her.

Having identified the initial launch area, the Stasi begins closing in on Pößneck. The Strelzyks and Wetzels purchase smaller quantities of taffeta from various stores to avoid suspicion, but they are running out of time. Peter tries to buy taffeta, claiming it is for his group of Young Pioneers, but the store manager secretly notifies the Stasi. The men eventually finish the balloon, but have no time to test it. On 15 September 1979, the families prepare to act on the plan while the Stasi finds blood-pressure medicine belonging to Peter's wife Doris where the first balloon had landed. The Stasi contacts the pharmacy and is able to identify the owner of the pills as Doris. The families' neighbor, a member of the Stasi, reports that they had been acting suspiciously. The families leave only minutes before the Stasi arrives at their homes. They reach their launch point while the border is placed on emergency alert.

The balloon is inflated and the burner is lit. Both families climb into the balloon's basket and cut their ropes. A fire is started in the cloth, but it is quickly extinguished by Günter. They later notice a hole in the balloon and hope that it will hold. While in flight, the balloon is spotted and Koerner pursues them in a helicopter. Eventually, the burner's propane supply is expended and the balloon descends, and the border guard is mobilized to find them. The balloon lands in a clearing with all eight people unharmed. Peter and Günter attempt to determine where they are as they are discovered by a police car. Peter asks the police if they are in the West, and the police officer confirms. Overjoyed, Peter and Günter light their signal flare. The families happily embrace.

== Cast ==
- John Hurt as Peter Strelzyk
- Doug McKeon as Frank Strelzyk
- Keith McKeon as Fitscher Strelzyk
- Beau Bridges as Günter Wetzel
- Jane Alexander as Doris Strelzyk
- Glynnis O'Connor as Petra Wetzel
- Klaus Löwitsch as Schmolk
- Geoffrey Liesik as Peter Wetzel
- Michael Liesik as Andreas Wetzel
- Ian Bannen as Josef Keller
- Anne Stallybrass as Magda Keller
- Matthew Taylor as Lukas Keller
- Günter Meisner as Major Koerner
- Sky Dumont as Ziegler
- Jan Niklas as Lieutenant Fehler
- Kay Walsh as Doris' Mother

== Production ==
Following the widely reported escape by the Strelzyk and Wetzel families from East Germany via makeshift hot air balloon, Tom Leetch, a producer for Walt Disney Pictures, approached Disney's then vice president of production, Ron Miller, about adapting the families' story for film which resulted in the company contacting the families to secure the rights. Executive producer Eva Redfern met with the families in West Germany who accepted the offer of $55,000 ($50,000 of which was contingent upon the studio's decision to actually make the film) as they had fond memories watching Disney films through pirated telecasts during their time in East Germany. The Strelzyks and Wetzels hoped the film would give others insight into life in East Germany and contributed heavily to advising the production by recording 20 hours of interviews for usage by the production team.

Filming had been scheduled to begin in September 1980 in Munich, but the 1980 actors strike delayed production until October. The production team created seven balloons for the film. During the last week of filming, unexpected snowfall caused delays that resulted in the film finishing a week behind schedule and in excess of the film's budget, estimated at more than $10 million.

== Reaction to the film in East Germany ==
The West German ZDF TV channel could be viewed in East Germany by many people. When ZDF showed Night Crossing in its German version Mit dem Wind nach Westen on June 17, 1985, a Stasi secret police report from Pritzwalk noted: "This film was watched by broad sections of the population (...) Out of 80 citizens who watched it, 76 were enthusiastic about this work of art. Opinions such as: 'The movie was exciting and I really had to cheer for this escape to succeed'; 'These people and their courage were to be admired'; 'There are even more possibilities and methods to leave the GDR illegally' were not uncommon in the discussion."

== Critical reception ==
In her review for the New York Times, Janet Maslin declared that the film "isn't much good, but is still, in its flatfooted way, quite entertaining", adding that Night Crossing must be "the only adventure film ever to feature suspenseful footage of two men taking turns at a sewing machine." Maslin stated that the film, "directed with a reassuring corniness by Delbert Mann", featured performers who "tend toward white-knuckled overstatement", with all four of the adults "terrifically tearful during the portion of the movie that details their painful decision to float across the Iron Curtain", and that despite this, "when they finally take off, the story does, too". The real star of the film according to Maslin was the balloon, of which the version produced specifically by Disney "performed splendidly, even if it didn't look the least bit homemade."

At the 4th Annual Youth in Film Awards held in 1982, the film received two nominations: one for Best Family Motion Picture, and one for Best Young Motion Picture Actor (Doug McKeon).
