= Oesterreichisches Musiklexikon =

Austrian music encyclopedia

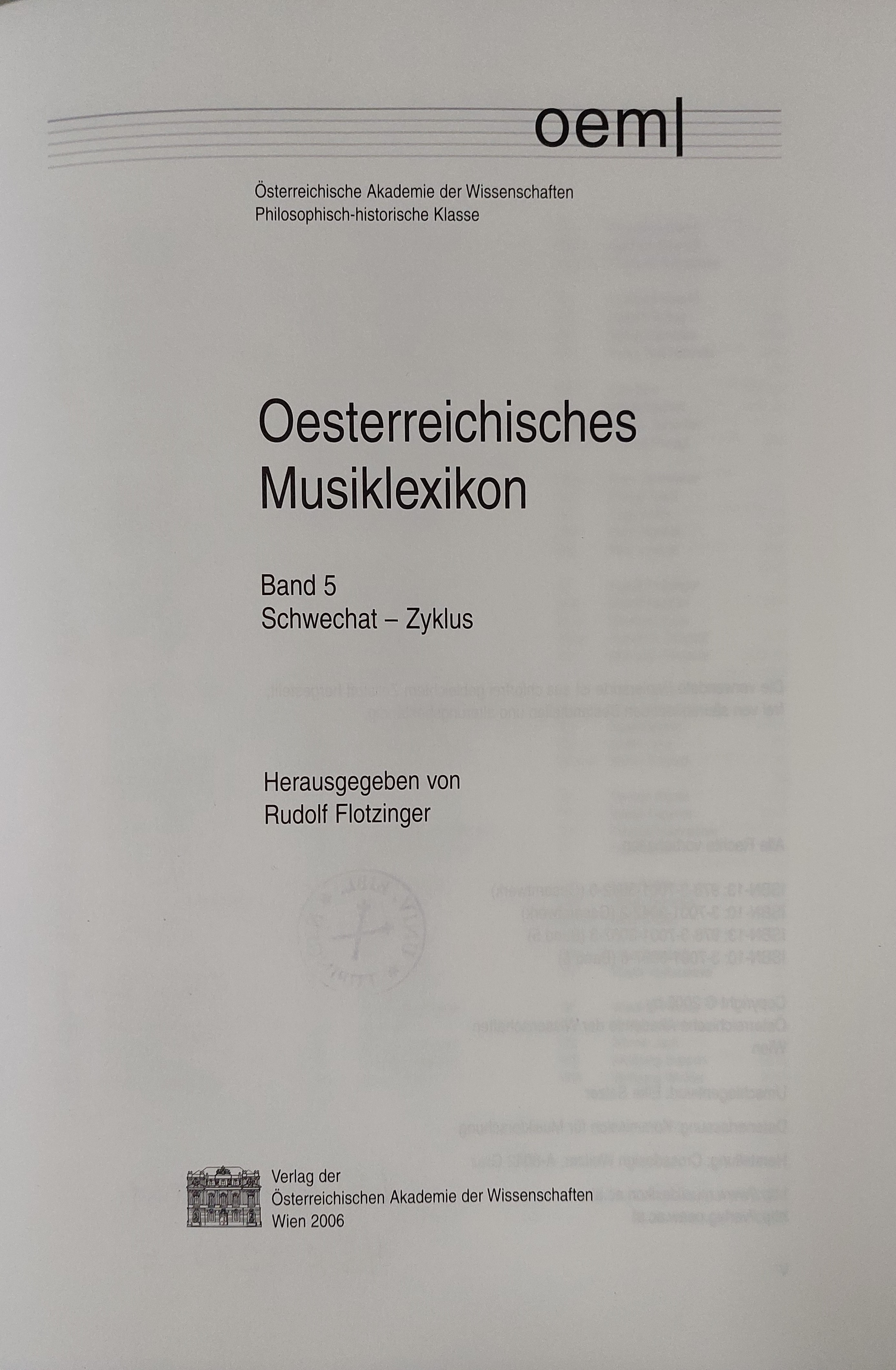

The Oesterreichisches Musiklexikon (Note: Oesterreichisch with Oe is the spelling of the print and online output.) (German pronunciation: [ˌøːstəʁaɪçɪʃəs muˈziːkˌlɛksikɔn], lit. 'Austrian Music Lexicon') is a five-volume music encyclopedia founded by the Austrian Academy of Sciences' Commission for Music Research. It was officially launched on 19 May 2002 with a concert in the main broadcasting hall of Österreichischer Rundfunk (ORF) in Vienna.

== Contents ==
The Oesterreichisches Musiklexikon consists of five volumes with almost 2800 pages and 7474 keywords on all current and historical topics of Austrian music and musical life. In addition to biographies of composers, librettists, conductors, instrumentalists, singers, dancers, choreographers, theatre directors, instrument makers, music publishers, musicologists and music critics, it also contains numerous articles on ensembles, bands, associations, instruments, musical forms, customs, dances, theatres, monasteries, cities, record labels and publishing houses. In addition to classical music, folk music, light music, jazz, hits and rock/pop also play an important role. Not only today's Austria, but also parts of the Habsburg monarchy belonging to other states today are taken into account.

The encyclopedia was edited by the Austrian musicologist Rudolf Flotzinger with four permanent members of the Commission for Music Research of the Austrian Academy of Sciences in cooperation with numerous scholars from Austria and abroad. From 2002 a volume was published annually. In 2008, a register was published on CD-ROM with about 21,700 names, 4500 places and 5800 keywords.

An online version offered at the same time started with the complete article stock of the print edition, but is continuously corrected and expanded. The text of the articles has been available online free of charge since 2013; some additional functions are subject to a charge. The encyclopedia is part of the works available at the Biographical Portal.

== Published volumes ==
The complete work was published by the editions of the Austrian Academy of Sciences, Vienna 2002–05, ISBN 3-7001-3041-4.

- Volume 1 (Abbado to Fux). 2002, ISBN 3-7001-3043-0.
- Volume 2 (Gaal to Kluger). 2003, ISBN 3-7001-3044-9.
- Volume 3 (Kmentt to Nyzankivskyj). 2004, ISBN 3-7001-3045-7.
- Volume 4 (Ober to Schwaz). 2005, ISBN 3-7001-3046-5.
- Volume 5 (Schwechat to Zyklus). 2006, ISBN 3-7001-3067-8.
