= Wolfgang Welsch =

English divine

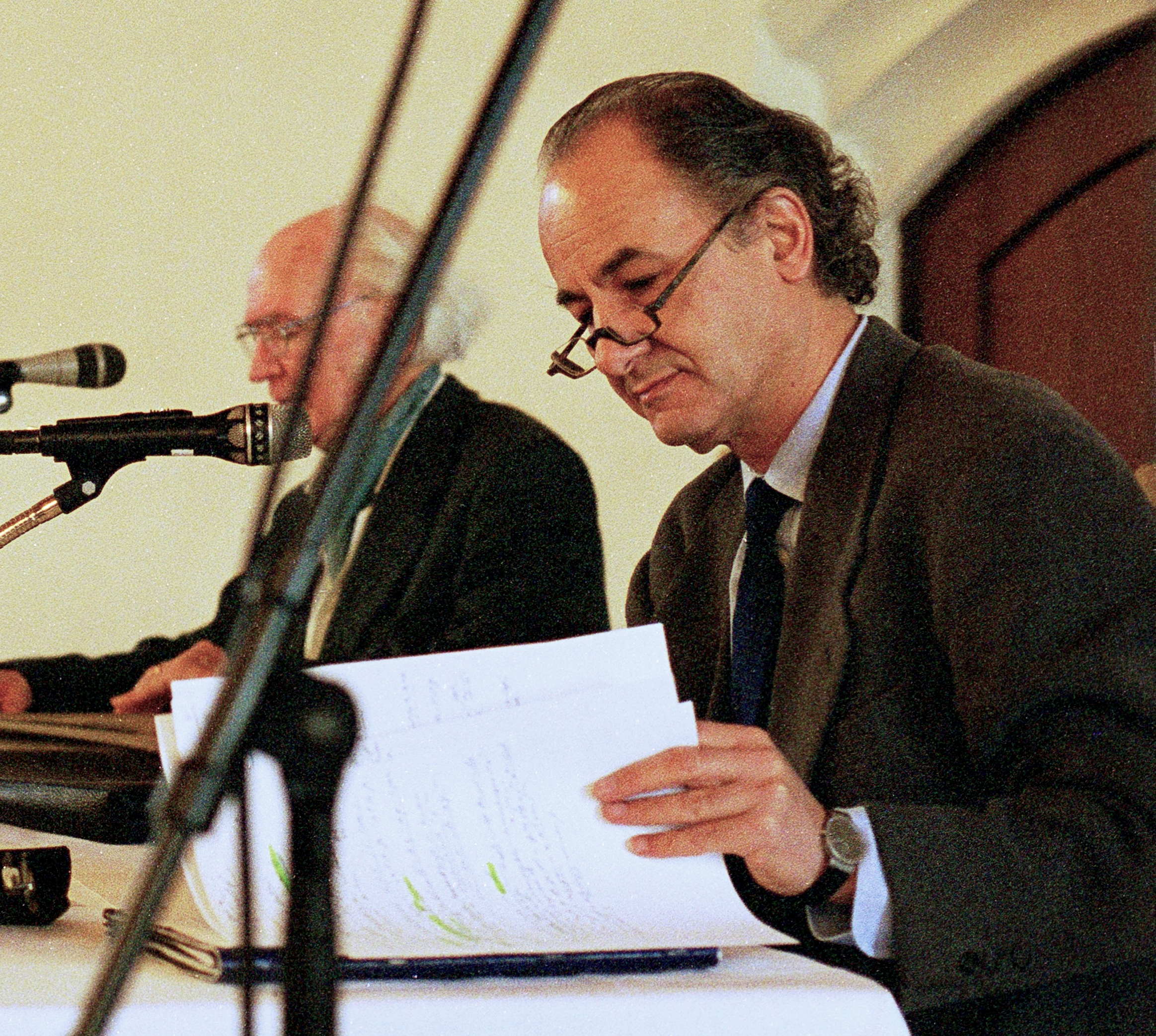
- Welsch in 1999
- Born: 17 October 1946 (age 80); Steinenhausen, Kulmbach, Germany
- Occupation: Philosopher

Wolfgang Welsch (born 17 October 1946) is a German philosopher. He is professor emeritus of philosophy at the University of Jena. He lives in Berlin, and has taught at the Free University of Berlin and Humboldt University of Berlin. Welsch has also taught in the United States at Stanford University and Emory University. His main field of research is aesthetics.
