= Pößneck =

- Town
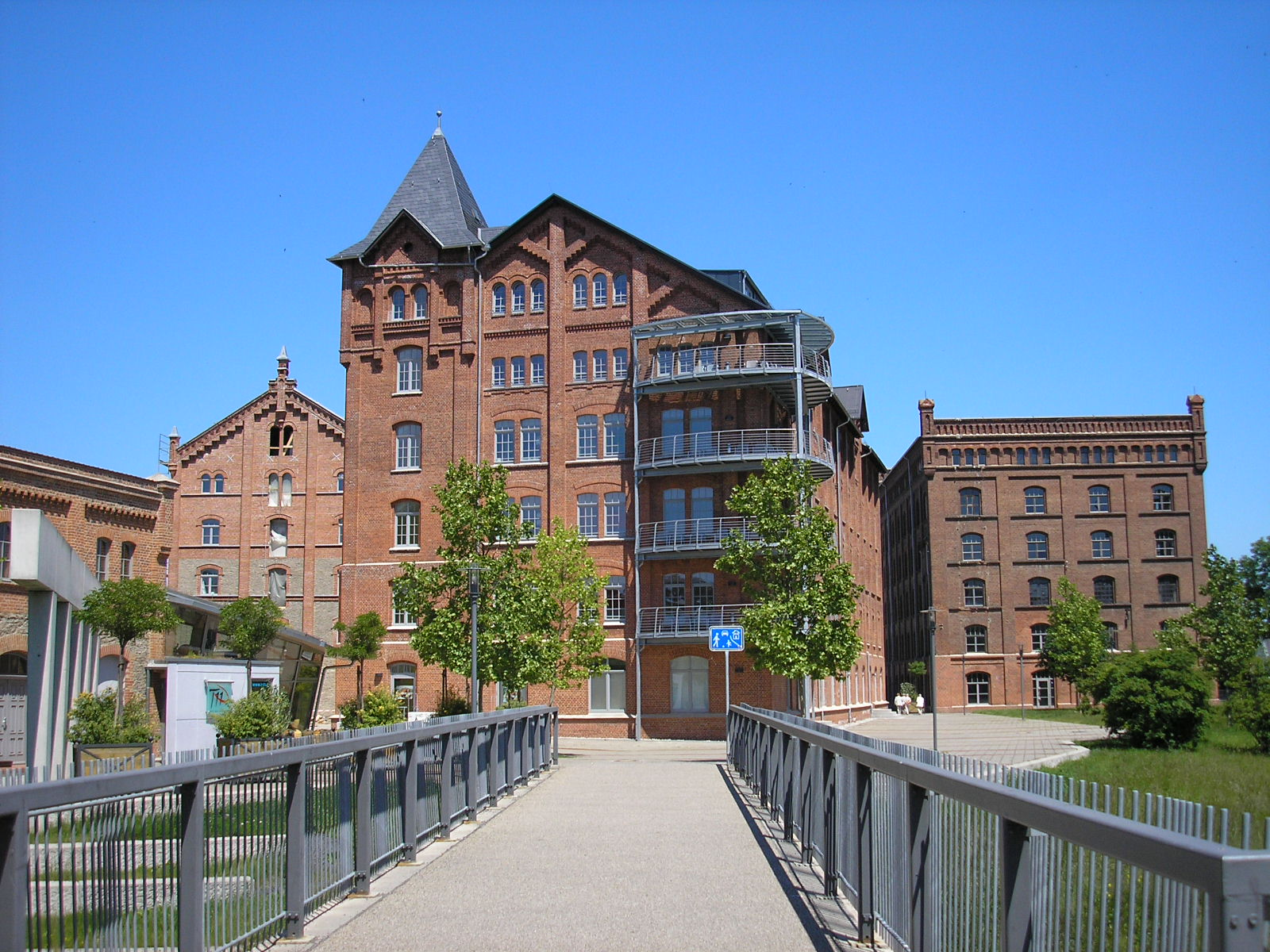

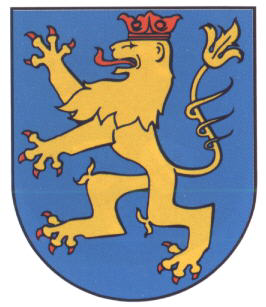
- Coat of arms

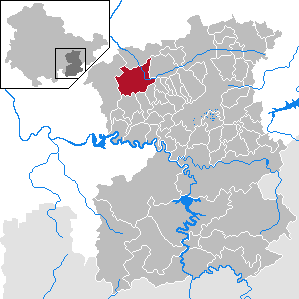
- Location of Pößneck within Saale-Orla-Kreis district
- Interactive map of Pößneck
- Location within Germany Location within Thuringia
- Coordinates: 50°42′N 11°36′E
- Country: Germany
- State: Thuringia
- District: Saale-Orla-Kreis
- Subdivisions: 6

Government
  - Mayor (2024–30): Michael Modde

Area
  - Total: 24.43 km^{2} (9.43 sq mi)
- Elevation: 220 m (720 ft)

Population (2025-12-31)
  - Total: 11,960
  - Density: 489.6/km^{2} (1,268/sq mi)
- Time zone: UTC+01:00 (CET)
  - Summer (DST): UTC+02:00 (CEST)
- Postal codes: 07371–07381
- Dialling codes: 03647
- Vehicle registration: SOK
- Website: www.poessneck.de

Pößneck (German pronunciation: [ˈpœsnɛk]; also spelled Poessneck) is a town in the Saale-Orla-Kreis district, in Thuringia, Germany. It is situated 19 km (12 miles) east of Rudolstadt, and 26 km (16 miles) south of Jena.

== History ==
Pößneck, which is of Slavonic origin, passed about 1300 to the Landgrave of Thuringia. Later it belonged to Saxony and later still to the duchy of Saxe-Coburg-Saalfeld, passing to Saxe-Meiningen in 1826.

A Gothic church built about 1390 now serves an Evangelical congregation. Pößneck also contains a Gothic town-hall erected during the succeeding century.

== Balloon escape ==
Pößneck was the home of the Strelzyk and Wetzel families prior to 15 September 1979, when both families flew out of East Germany in a homemade hot air balloon. Following the end of the Cold War and German reunification, they eventually moved back to Pößneck. Their story was the subject of the 1982 film Night Crossing and again in the 2018 film Balloon.

== Economy ==
Its chief industries are the making of flannel, porcelain, furniture, machines, musical instruments, and chocolate. The town has also tanneries, breweries, dyeworks and brickworks.

== Notable people ==
- Albert Wagner (1848 - 1898), architect in New York City
- Robert Diez (1844–1922), sculptor, created among others the fountains of the Albert place in Dresden
- Rudolf Koch (1856–1921), press drawer
- Alfred Maul (1870–1942), engineer, pioneer of air reconnaissance
- Konrad Enke (1934–2016), swimmer
- Roland Matthes (1950–2019), swimmer
- Marcel Dettmann (born 1977), techno DJ, producer
- Susan Link (born 1979), journalist and talk show host
- Nico Herzig (born 1983), football player
- Denny Herzig (born 1984), football player
- Maurice Hehne (born 1997), football player
