= Rheinland-Pfälzische Personendatenbank =

- Website type: Online database
- Available in: German
- Owner: Rheinische Landesbibliothek Koblenz
- Editor: Rheinische Landesbibliothek Koblenz
- Website: http://www.rppd-rlp.de
- Commercial: No
- Registration: Optional
- Launched: 2005
- Current status: Active

The Rheinland-Pfälzische Personendatenbank (People database of Rhineland-Palatinate, RPPD) is an internet database with short biographies of people who have lived or worked in Rhineland-Palatinate. It is being edited at four scientific libraries in Rhineland-Palatinate: Rheinische Landesbibliothek Koblenz, Pfälzische Landesbibliothek Speyer, Stadtbibliothek Mainz, Stadtbibliothek Trier. The RPPD is hosted by Rheinische Landesbibliothek Koblenz, a facility of the Landesbibliothekszentrums Rheinland-Pfalz.

== Content ==
Research for the Rheinland-Pfälzische Bibliographie often results also in biographical data. In 2005, this developed into the idea for a separate database.

== Criteria ==
The criterion for an entry is that a person was born on the territory of today's Rhineland-Palatinate (also before the establishment of the Bundesland in 1946) or has died there or has done some significant work there. Currently (April 2013), around 10,000 people from Roman times onwards are recorded. With authorization by the rights owners data from printed biographical reference works were added. As far as dead people are concerned, the name registers have been integrated into the biography portal in March 2012. A dataset includes the following information (if ascertainable): name forms, sex, life dates, places of life and work, occupations, fields of expertise, relations to other persons (inside and outside of the RPPD), own works, sources, biographical text. All this information can also be researched.
