= Haus der Bayerischen Geschichte: Museum =

History museum in Regensburg, Germany

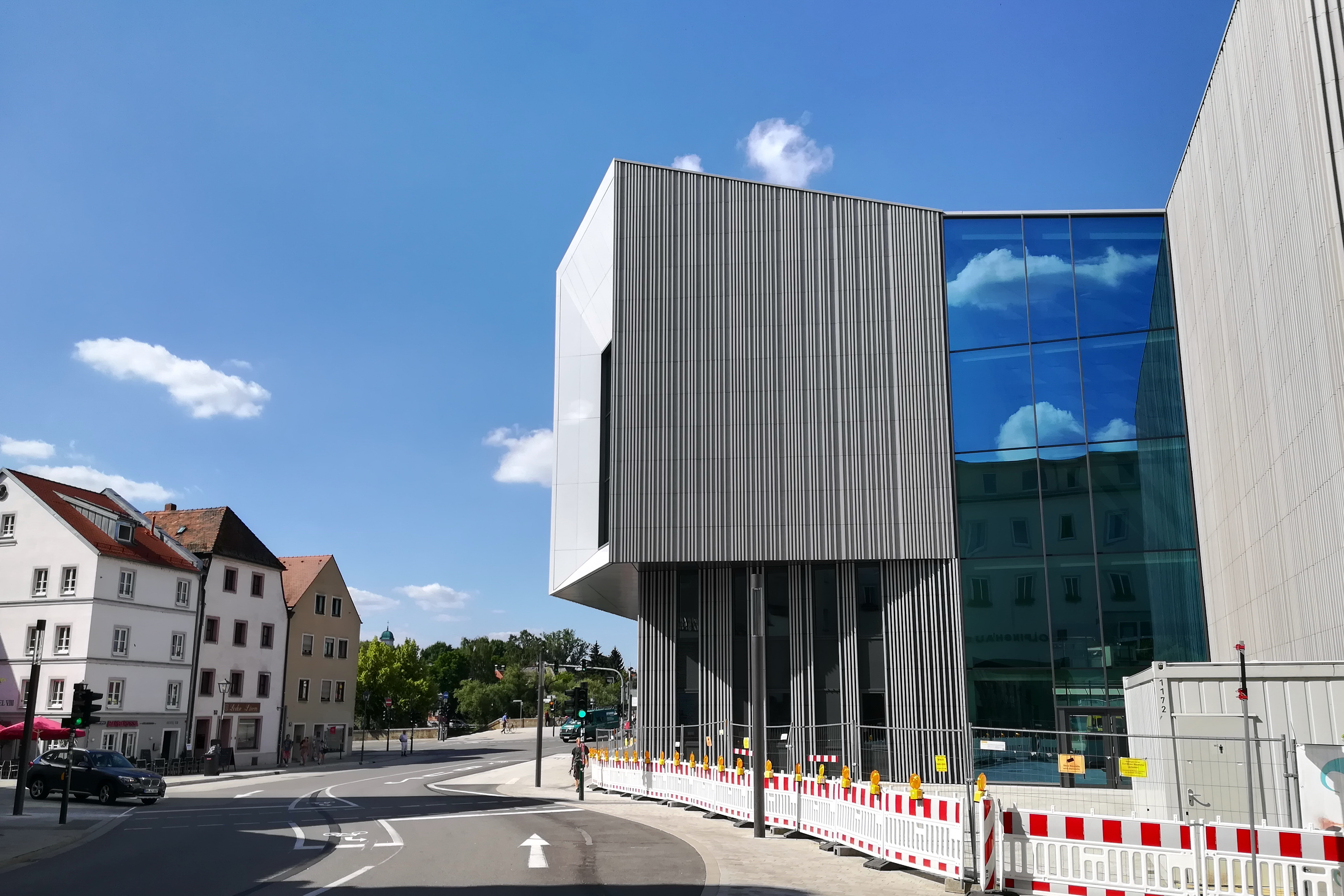
- Museum building

- Location within Bavaria Location within Germany
- Established: 2019
- Location: Regensburg, Germany
- Coordinates: 49°01′12″N 12°06′12″E

The Haus der Bayerischen Geschichte: Museum (aka Museum der Bayerischen Geschichte) is a history museum about the history of Bavaria, located in Regensburg. It is part of Haus der Bayerischen Geschichte (Munich) which is financed by the state government.

It opened on June 5, 2019. The director is Richard Loibl.

The permanent exhibition area measures 2500 m^{2} and displays c. 1,000 objects in the time span from 1806 (Kingdom of Bavaria) until the present time.

The construction of the building and the interior cost c. 95 million euros.

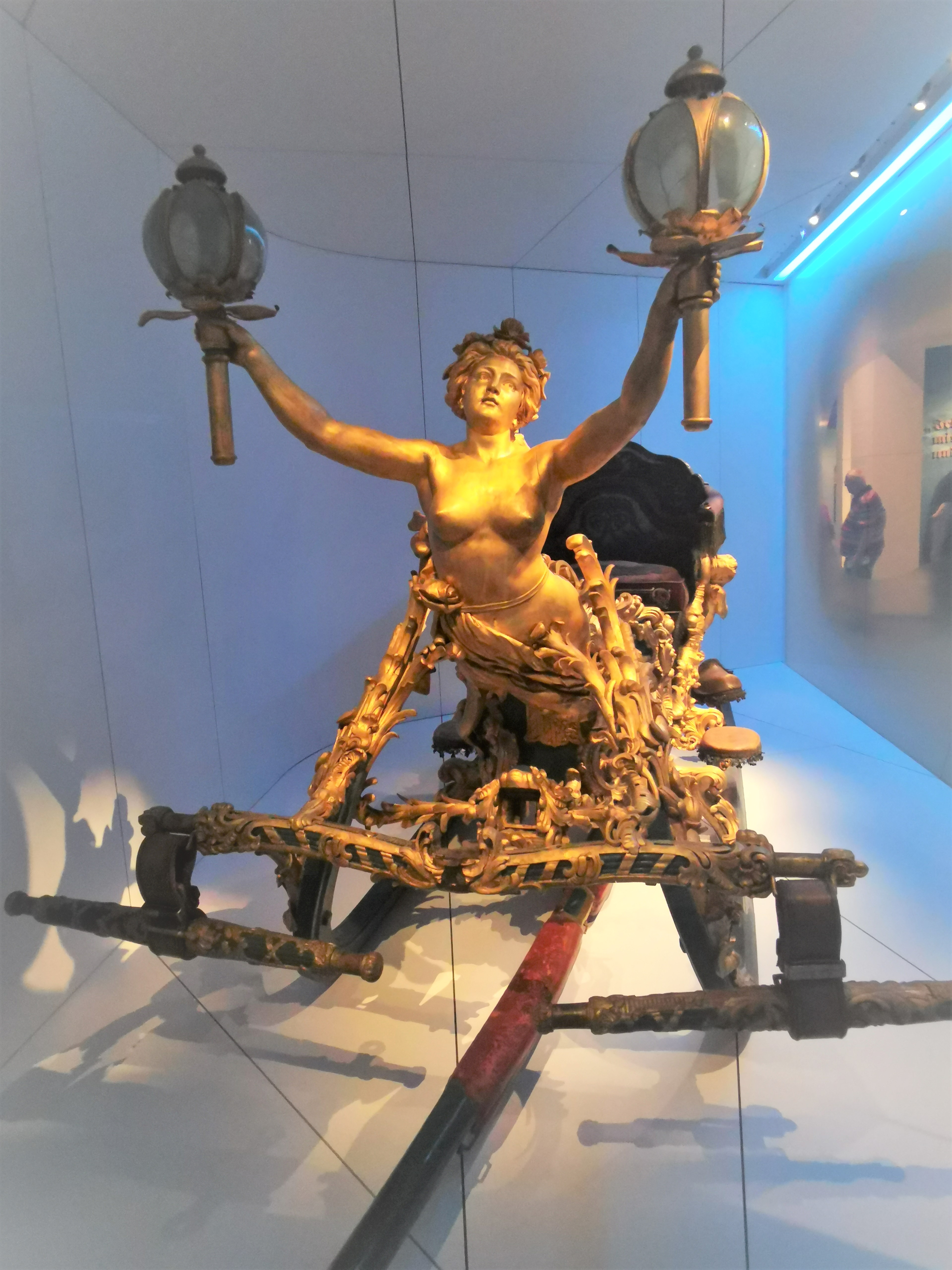
Nymph sled of Ludwig II.

== See also ==
- List of museums in Germany § Bavaria
