= Sächsische Biografie =

Historical encyclopedia on the history of people from Saxony

- Producer: Institute of Saxon History and Cultural Anthropology (Germany)
- Languages: German

Access
- Cost: Free

Coverage
- Temporal coverage: 10th century to present
- Geospatial coverage: Saxony
- No. of records: 10,500

Links
- Website: saebi.isgv.de

Sächsische Biografie (SäBi) [Saxon biography] is a biographical dictionary of noteworthy persons in the history of Saxony from the 10th century to the present. As of 2014 it contained entries for about 10,500 persons and about 1,250 biographies. Access via the project's website and the Biographical Portal is free of charge.

The dictionary is a project of the Institute of Saxon History and Cultural Anthropology (ISGV) in Dresden. The project is directed by historian Martina Schattkowsky.

== Coverage ==
The dictionary provides biographical data for men and women from all walks of life who were notable in the history of Saxony.

Temporal coverage extends from the 10th century, which saw the gradual onset of literacy in the area around Meissen, down to the present time. Geographic coverage is within the historical borders of the governments that have existed in Saxony, including the medieval duchy, the electorate of the Holy Roman Empire, and the current Free State of Saxony.

Biographical articles describe the ancestry, life history, and achievements of individuals and families, according to standard guidelines. The length of articles varies depending on the importance of the individual and the available sources. The scholarly apparatus includes works cited, sources, secondary literature, and when appropriate references to portraits.

== Access ==
The index and full-text biographies in German can be accessed via the ISGV website and the Biographical Portal, a common index of major German biographical dictionaries.

The biographies can also be accessed directly from Wikipedia articles via links in the BEACON format, which is being developed by volunteers at the German Wikipedia.

== Notes ==
=== References ===
- Schattkowsky, Martina (2006). "Über das Projekt" (in German). ISGV.
- Schattkowsky, Martina (2014). "Die Vernetzung der 'Sächsischen Biografie' – Praxis und Ausblick". Jahrestagung der Digital Humanities Im Deutschsprachigen Raum (DHD 2014) (in German). Universität Passau: 7–8.
