= Nefarious: Merchant of Souls =

2011 film by Benjamin Nolot

- Film poster
- Directed by: Benjamin Nolot
- Written by: Benjamin Nolot
- Produced by: Benjamin Nolot
- Starring: Bill Oberst Jr. Christian Simpson (as Christian J. Simpson); Allison Weissman; Sarah Agor; Jess Allen; Melissa Cantatore
- Narrated by: Benjamin Nolot
- Cinematography: Matthew Dickey; Steve Willis
- Edited by: Matthew Dickey
- Music by: John Samuel Hanson
- Distributed by: Exodus Cry
- Release date: July 27, 2011
- Running time: 96 minutes
- Country: United States

Nefarious: Merchant of Souls is a 2011 American documentary film about modern human trafficking, specifically sexual slavery. Presented from a Christian worldview, Nefarious covers human trafficking in the United States, Western and Eastern Europe, and Southeast Asia, alternating interviews with re-enactments. Victims of trafficking talk about having been the objects of physical abuse and attempted murder. Several former prostitutes talk about their conversion to Christianity, escape from sexual oppression, and subsequent education or marriage. The film ends with the assertion that only Jesus can completely heal people from the horrors of sexual slavery.

Nefarious was written, directed, produced and narrated by Benjamin Nolot, founder and president of Exodus Cry, the film's distributor. Nolot, who travelled to 19 countries to collect the film's content, said that the purpose of the film is "to draw people's attention to the issue, but also to inspire them in terms of what they can be doing … to take a stand against this injustice." The film was officially released on July 27, 2011, with individual grassroots screenings also taking place. Laila Mickelwait, Exodus Cry's director of awareness and prevention, screened the film in several countries in an attempt to persuade governments to make laws similar to Sweden's Sex Purchase Act, which criminalizes the purchasing rather than the selling of sex. The film was released on home video on May 1, 2012.

Interviewees in the film include Canadian journalist Victor Malarek, Jerusalem Institute of Justice founder Calev Myers, Christian therapist Dan Allender, clinical psychologist Melissa Farley, Piet Keesman, Baptist missionary Lauran Bethell, Agape International Missions founder Don Brewster, anti-trafficking activist Helen Sworn, former prostitute Annie Lobert, and Swedish detective superintendent Kajsa Wahlberg. Ted Baehr of Movieguide, a Christian magazine, called the film "a powerful, compelling and transformational documentary about human trafficking and sex slavery" and commented that it covered the inherently sexual subject matter candidly without displaying nudity. Dan Preston of Godculture Magazine praised Nolot's writing and directing. Nefarious has won film awards, including the Honolulu Film Award for best screenplay, the Urban Mediamakers Film Festival best documentary feature award, and the Indie Fest feature documentary award of excellence.

== Themes ==
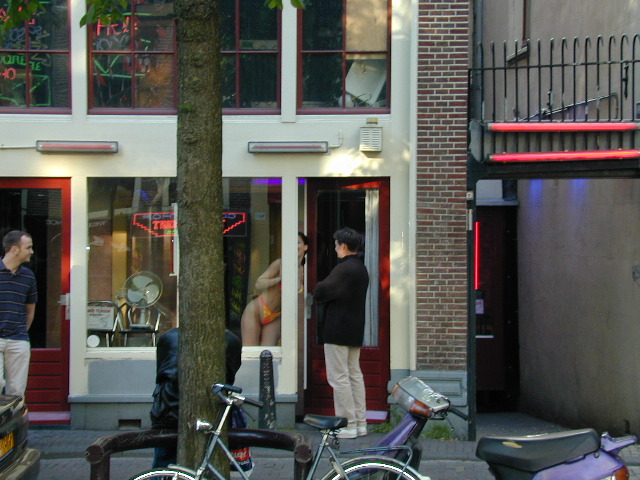
Nefarious contrasts prostitution in the Netherlands (pictured) with the sex industry in Eastern Europe, presenting the former as open and public and the latter as secretive and brutal.

Nefarious: Merchant of Souls documents modern human trafficking, specifically sexual slavery. While there are men and boys who are trafficked around the world, the United States Department of State (DoS) estimates that about 80% of human trafficking victims are female, and the film focuses on them. Information is presented from a Christian worldview—despite the subject matter, there is no profanity or nudity in the film, although there are scenes showing alcohol consumption and women wearing skimpy clothing.

Nefarious explores how sex trafficking differs from country to country, and suggests that all the victims are both psychologically and emotionally enslaved. One of the initial assertions in the film is that slavery has not been abolished but is increasing, and that half of this slavery is sexual in nature. Nefarious identifies political corruption and difficult socioeconomic situations as elements that prevent sex slaves from escaping exploitation, and suggests that most victims do not survive for more than seven years after initially being trafficked. While the violent acquisition of sex slaves depicted in the first sequence of the film does occur in reality, Jimmy Stewart of Charisma wrote that most girls who are sexually trafficked in Europe are recruited through a fraudulent offer of employment and an improved lifestyle overseas, neither of which ultimately materializes in the new country.

Nefarious asserts that there is a link between the international sex industry and legal prostitution in the Western world, and that those who create the demand for forced prostitution around the world are of a wide variety of ages and are often considered respectable. The film contrasts the secretiveness and brutality of the sex industry in Eastern Europe with the openness of public prostitution in the Netherlands. Nefarious suggests that sex trafficking in Southeast Asia is fuelled largely by the complicity of the victims' parents, with many in Cambodia grooming and then knowingly selling their daughters into prostitution to pay for luxury goods. The film asserts that 10% of the population of Moldova has been sexually trafficked. Nefarious contrasts Las Vegas prostitutes with victims of sex trafficking in Europe, depicting the former as drawn into the sex industry by dreams of a glamorous lifestyle, and the latter as made vulnerable by child abandonment and orphanages.

The film presents human trafficking statistics and assertions from a variety of sources, prominently departments of the United States government and the United Nations. These include that human trafficking is growing faster than any other criminal industry, that the average age of those forced into prostitution in the U.S. is 13, that the commercial sexual exploitation of children victimizes almost two million children globally, that 80% of trafficked women and 50% of trafficked children are sexually exploited, that 161 UN member states engage in human trafficking, and that modern slavery has an annual revenue of US$32,000,000,000—according to the film, higher than the annual revenues of Major League Baseball, the National Basketball Association, the National Football League and the National Hockey League combined. The film indicates that "trafficking is an exploitation of vulnerability" and expresses the need to "take away the stigma that [prostitutes] choose to be there." Kevin Bales of Free the Slaves is quoted as saying that there are 27 million slaves in the world. The film ends with the assertion that only Jesus can free people from sexual slavery.

== Contents ==
=== Re-enactments and live footage ===
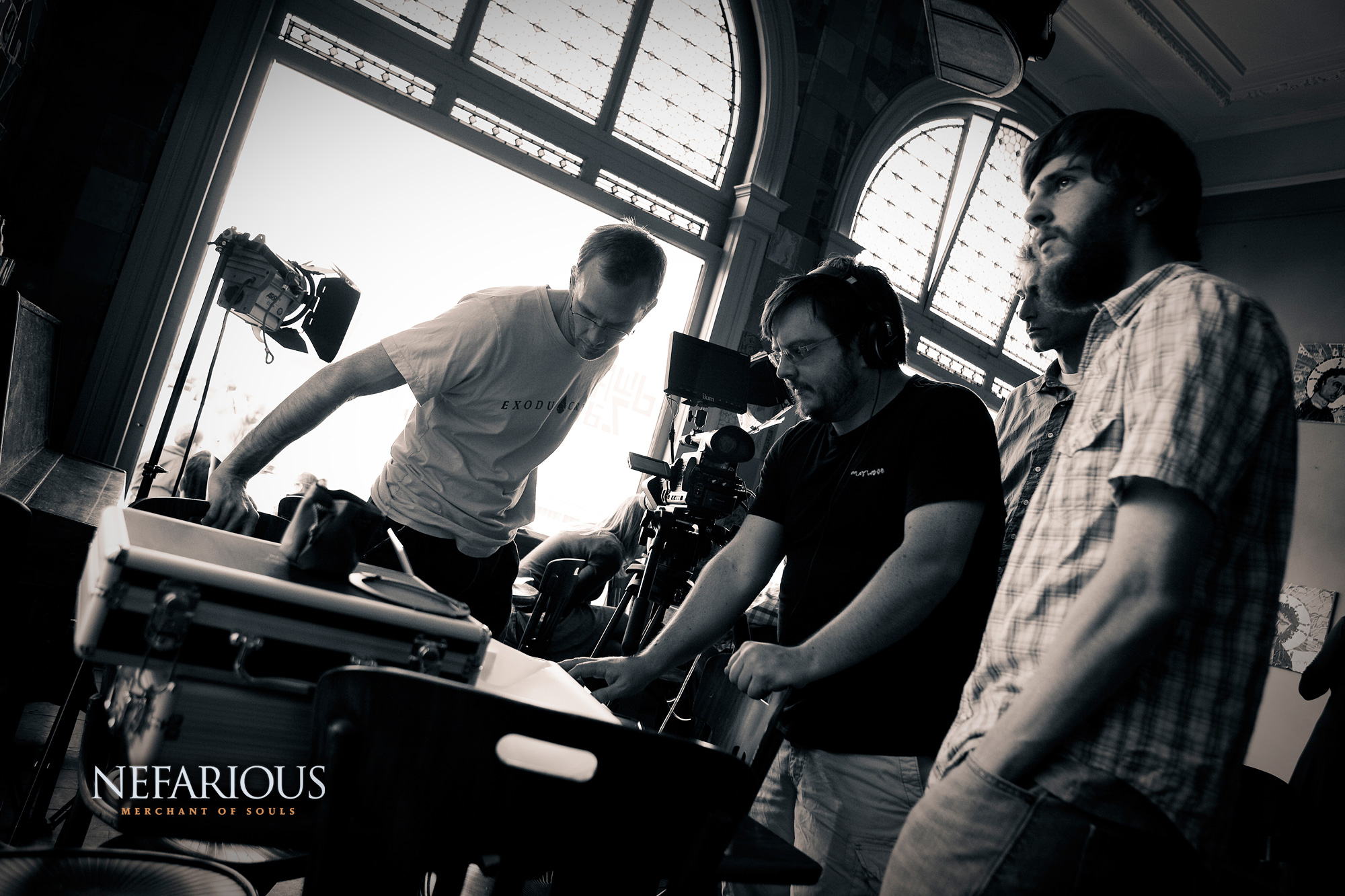
The film's director and producer, Benjamin Nolot (left), also served as the narrator and interviewer.

Nefarious covers human trafficking in the United States, Western and Eastern Europe, and Southeast Asia. Interviews are interspersed with re-enactments. The film opens with a re-enactment of a girl being kidnapped by organized criminals. She is confined with other girls in a dark room, lit by a flickering lightbulb. Men order the girls to remove their clothes, and then examine them and shout commands and threats at them, causing them to cry from fear. One girl is dragged into another room. A victim of ordeals such as these, speaking in voiceover, explains that, in this situation, girls are often taken into a separate room to have their sexual performance tested. Identifying these events as taking place near Belgrade, Serbia, the film then tracks the fictional girls through Croatia to Amsterdam's red-light district De Wallen, and to sex markets in Berlin and Las Vegas. The film states that this slavery goes unnoticed in cities where prostitution is legal. Slaves are depicted in confinement, at their places of work, and as they are sold. Many of the girls are orphans, and all are either kidnapped or tricked into forced prostitution. Traffickers in the film use hard drugs, brainwashing and sexual and physical abuse to keep the girls under control.

One of the scenes in Southeast Asia takes place near a karaoke club, and depicts groups of girls, apparently ranging in age from early to late teens, offering sexual services to customers. Benjamin Nolot interviews a police officer, who says that the bar's owner recently bought eight other similar clubs and controls around 2,000 girls. Another Southeast Asian scene shows Nolot and his crew chasing an American man out of a town where he was trying to purchase sex with a child.

=== Interviews ===
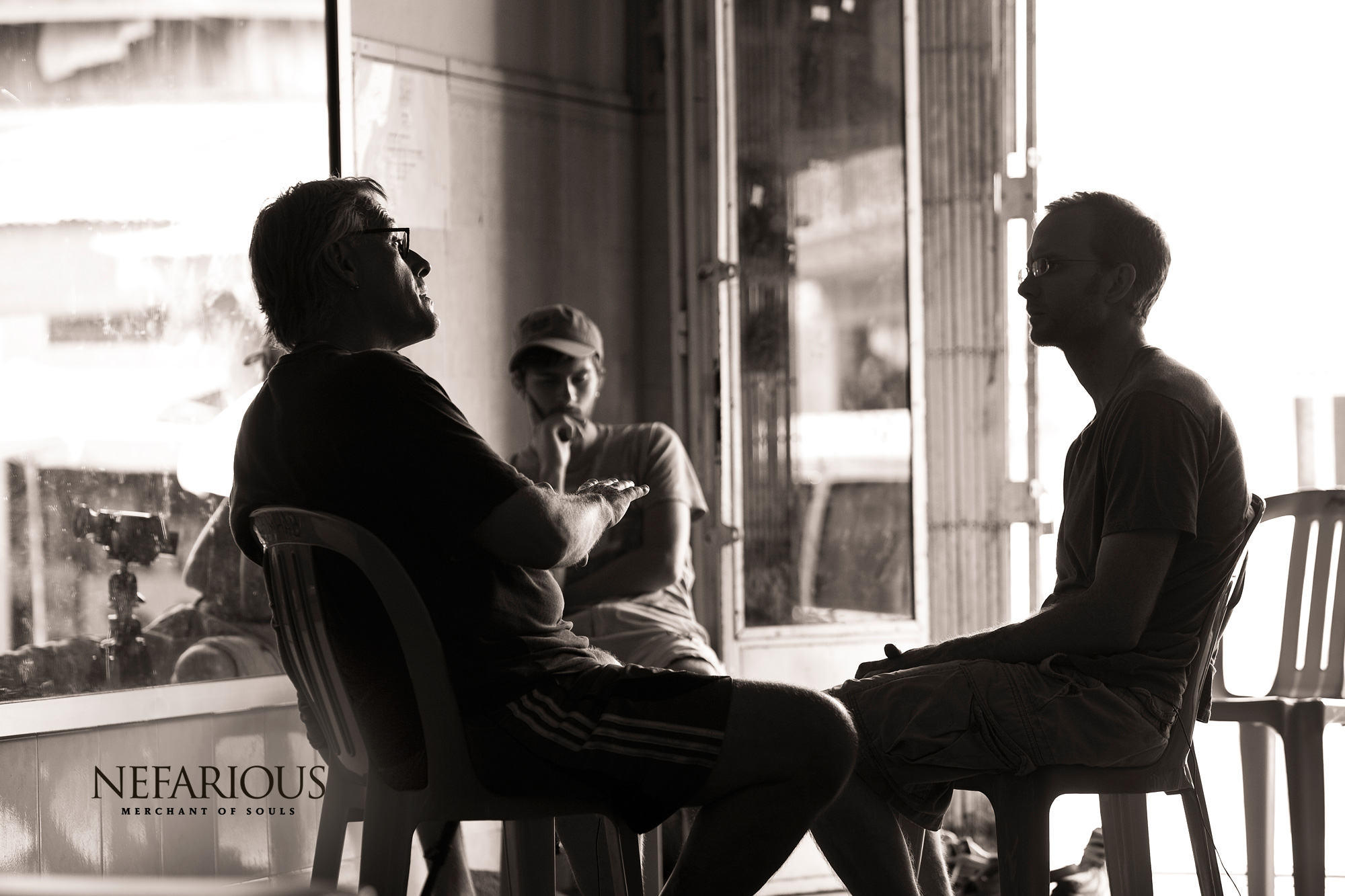
Agape International Missions founder Don Brewster (left) was interviewed by Nolot (right) for Nefarious.

The interviewees in Nefarious include former traffickers, international humanitarian workers, social workers, psychologists, human rights experts, and former victims of human trafficking. Interviewees include Canadian journalist Victor Malarek, Jerusalem Institute of Justice founder Calev Myers, Christian therapist Dan Allender, clinical psychologist Melissa Farley, Amsterdam police official Piet Keesman, Baptist missionary Lauran Bethell, Agape International Missions founder Don Brewster, anti-trafficking activist Helen Sworn, former prostitute Annie Lobert, and Swedish Detective Superintendent Kajsa Wahlberg.

The film includes an interview with a man referring to himself as "Vlad", who formerly trafficked in humans and drugs in Europe for eleven years. Vlad explains that traffickers control their victims by drugging them, physically abusing them, or threatening to abuse them. He claims that traffickers consider themselves most successful when the exploited girls start responding immediately to shouted, one-word commands. Vlad describes beating girls who tried to run away and says that he felt little remorse after such incidents; the large sums of money involved made him indifferent to the girls' fate. Vlad surmises that the reason global sex trafficking has expanded is that girls can be sold for sex repeatedly, while drugs can only be sold once. When asked how sex trafficking can function on an international scale, Vlad states that the two major contributory factors are organized crime and political corruption.

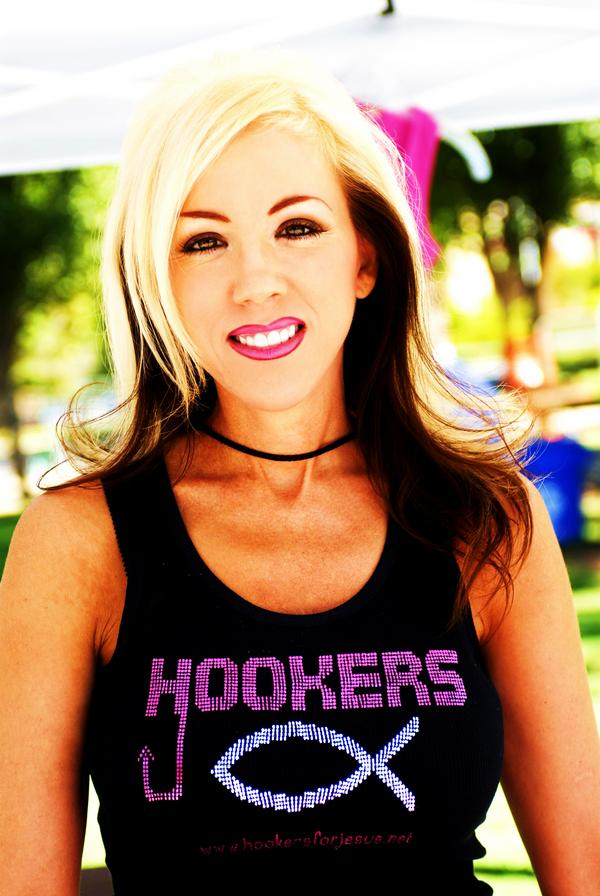
Annie Lobert, a former prostitute, says during her interview in Nefarious that, since prostitutes are required to constantly appear to enjoy something they do not, prostitution is "the greatest acting job."

Another interview features an Amsterdam pimp, "Slim", who owns a business allowing passers-by to view scantily clad girls in a display window; they can have sex with them on a mattress in a back room. He initially says that the display window women are not in any danger while with a client in the back room, but later clarifies that the girls should "keep a hand close to the panic button" located on the wall. When asked by Nolot if these activities are financed by organized crime, Slim hesitates, then says no.

A female human trafficking victim is interviewed with her face hidden. She describes how she and other human trafficking victims in Eastern Europe were held in buildings with security cameras, where they were forced to walk naked down a runway before a group of men who watched under the guise of attending a fashion show. She then describes being auctioned off to the audience members, who she says examined her off the runway as one might examine cattle.

A 55-year-old woman from England tells the story of how she was first prostituted in Boscombe, near Bournemouth in Dorset, after being raped as a child in the council houses where she grew up. She describes running away, being raped again at the age of 13 and then being locked in a wardrobe in Manchester, and says that she found this situation normal at the time as it was the only life she knew. She eventually became addicted to heroin. She then describes a vision of Jesus that she says gave her the strength to escape sexual trafficking at the age of 40 and heroin six years later. Other victims of trafficking speak about having been the objects of physical abuse and attempted murder. Nevada prostitutes describe having gone into prostitution in Las Vegas after watching the film Pretty Woman. Several former prostitutes talk about their conversion to Christianity, escape from sexual oppression, and subsequent education or marriage. Some of them cry while telling their stories. Lobert calls prostitution "the greatest acting job", explaining that prostitutes have to constantly feign enjoyment while actually feeling none. Before Nefarious was completed, one of the former prostitutes interviewed for the film returned to prostitution, a fact acknowledged in the film.

In her interview, Swedish Detective Superintendent Kajsa Wahlberg describes purchasing sex from a prostitute as paying to masturbate into someone. The leader of an organization working to rescue girls from prostitution in Cambodia says that it is not the poorest parents who sell their children into sexual slavery but rather the parents who are looking to buy luxury goods. He therefore argues that sex trafficking is a spiritual and moral issue that cannot be solved by education or money. In another interview, a man purchasing sex in Thailand says that he believes the girls are happy to be working as prostitutes. Another interview features an American man who had been a sex tourist in Asia.

== Production ==
=== Background ===
Nefarious was written, directed, produced, and narrated by Benjamin Nolot, founder and president of Exodus Cry. Exodus Cry, which distributed the film, is headquartered in Grandview, Missouri and is an organization that opposes human trafficking by raising awareness, by reintegrating victims back into society, and by prayer. According to their website, they also oppose the "entire global sex industry, including prostitution, pornography, and stripping".

Nolot founded Exodus Cry in 2007 after a woman he did not know gave him US$10,000, saying that God told her to do so in order that Nolot might found an anti-human-trafficking organization. This was established at a prayer meeting later that year, where attendees prayed for human trafficking victims. The organization claims that this prayer meeting occurred on the day before the announcement of the 2007 international child pornography investigation, which involved approximately 2,400 human-trafficking-related arrests in 77 countries (although articles written at the time only mention the existence of 2,400 suspects as opposed to arrests, and indicate that the crime they were being accused of was possession and distribution of child pornography rather than human trafficking).

=== Filming ===
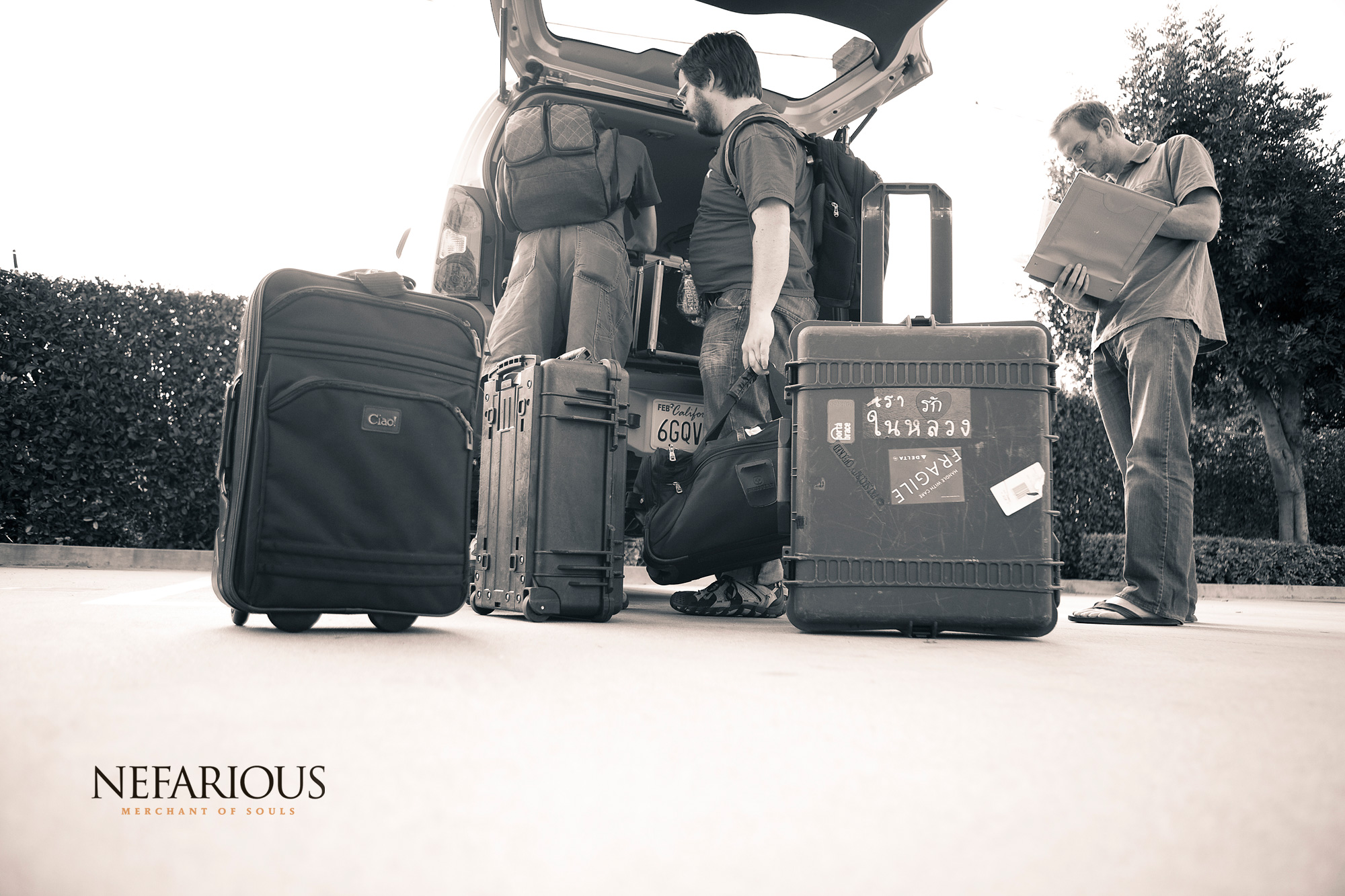
Nolot (right) travelled to 19 countries to collect material for Nefarious.

Filming of Nefarious was started in 2007, marking Nolot's film debut. The initial plan was to create a short film, but the project was expanded when Exodus Cry realized the scope of the issue they were documenting. Nolot, a leader in Mike Bickle's International House of Prayer, travelled to 19 countries to collect material for the film. These filming locations included countries in the Middle East, Europe, North America, and Asia. Nolot attested to having found it difficult to produce the film due to the subject matter; he stated that "there is not a day that goes by that I am not mindful of the horrific tragedies we uncovered." He further said that he did not make the film for money or for fame but did so to rouse people to action against human trafficking, an issue that he feels to be of great importance. Nolot said that the purpose of the film is "to draw people's attention to the issue, but also to inspire them in terms of what they can be doing … to take a stand against this injustice." Steve Willis and Matthew Dickey were the film's cinematographers. Willis, founder of Underpin Photography, also served as photographer while Dickey filled the roles of associate producer and Film editor, also directing the re-enactment scenes. Actors in these re-enactment scenes included Bill Oberst Jr., Christian Simpson (as Christian J. Simpson), Allison Weissman, Sarah Agor, and Jess Allen. John Samuel Hanson composed the film score for Nefarious after having worked on such other projects as 16 Blocks, Constantine, The Book of Eli, and Lost. As of January 2012, Nolot was producing two sequels to Nefarious.

== Release ==
=== Official release and grassroots screenings ===
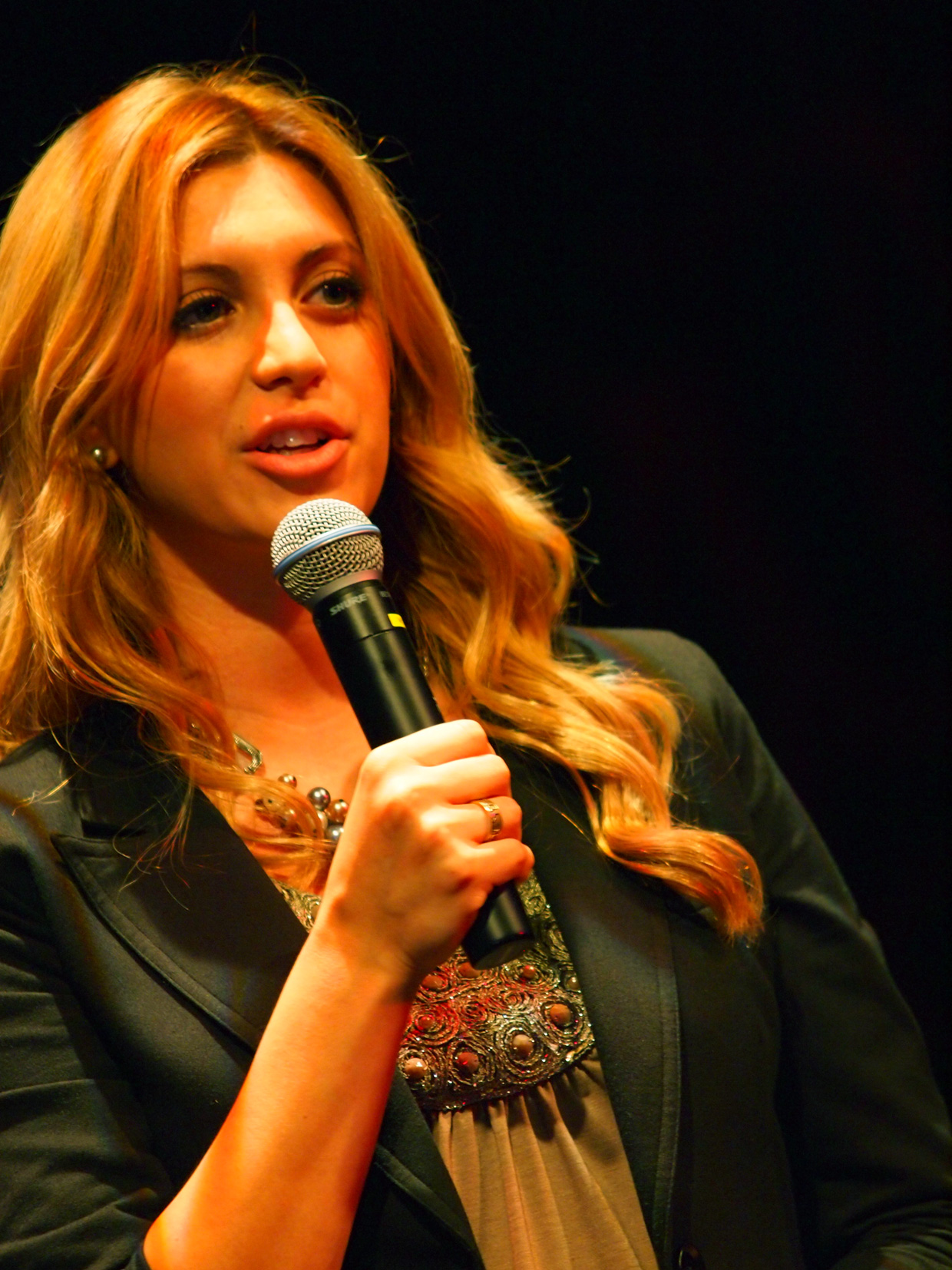
Exodus Cry's director of awareness and prevention, Laila Mickelwait, toured Nefarious around the world, attempting to persuade various countries to enact laws similar to Sweden's Sex Purchase Act, which makes it illegal to buy, but not to sell, sex.

The film was officially released on July 27, 2011, with individual grassroots screenings also taking place. Nolot appeared at a screening in Appleton, Wisconsin, and afterwards led a question and answer session with a local police officer. During this time, Nolot promoted the Red Light Campaign, wherein drivers waiting at red lights pray for sex trafficking to end. Texas State representative Todd Ames Hunter attended a screening at the Summit Church in Corpus Christi, saying that human trafficking "is a critical issue to the state of Texas that needs education and attention." The Justice Alliance, a Christian nonprofit organization that raises awareness about human trafficking, hosted a screening in the auditorium of El Dorado Middle School in Kansas. Florida Abolitionist, a non-governmental organization that also opposes human trafficking, sponsored a screening at the Full Sail University in Orlando, Florida. Most of the attendees were Christians. The Australian Christian Lobby (ACL) hosted two screenings of the film in 2012, one of which took place before the Parliament of Tasmania. The Government of Tasmania was considering reforms to the Tasmanian sex industry at the time and the ACL was disappointed because the only politicians who showed up to the screening were four members of the Liberal Party. The ACL planned screenings in the rest of the states of Australia as well, hoping to convince legislators that the criminalization of the purchase of sex is the only effective way of combatting sexual slavery. Another screening was held at United Nations headquarters in New York City in March 2012 during that year's session of the United Nations Commission on the Status of Women.

=== Home video release and subsequent screenings ===
Nefarious was released on home video on May 1, 2012. On June 26, the film made its British premiere, following which an interactive panel was held in which the audience was encouraged to fight human trafficking by donating funds, raising awareness, and praying. In September, the film was screened at The Rome International Film Festival in Rome, Georgia, the Midwest Christian-Inspirational Indie Film Festival in Chicago, Illinois, and the Atlanta International Documentary Film Festival in Atlanta, Georgia. Nefarious was screened at Oaxaca FilmFest two months later. The Rose Marine Theater in Fort Worth, Texas hosted a screening in celebration of Human Rights Day in December. Other screenings have taken place in South Korea, Hong Kong, Bermuda, and Canada. The Hong Kong premiere was attended by such people as Clement Cheng, Lori Chow, Cathy Leung, Pamela Peck, Nancy Sit, and Grace Wong, and the subsequent three weeks of screenings were all sold out. In May 2013, Katarina MacLeod, a former sex slave, spoke at a screening in Peterborough, Ontario hosted by Canadian Baptist Women of Ontario and Quebec. Laila Mickelwait, Exodus Cry's Director of Awareness and Prevention, screened the film in several countries in an attempt to persuade governments to make laws similar to Sweden's Sex Purchase Act, which criminalizes the purchasing rather than the selling of sex. Because Sweden now has the lowest human trafficking rate in the European Union, Mickelwait argued that such laws decrease the demand for commercial sex and effectively combat related organized crime (although other sources have since claimed that "sex workers in Sweden now experience increased risk of violence", and state that "the law has failed in its abolitionist ambition to decrease levels of prostitution, since there [is] no reliable data demonstrating any overall decline in people selling sex.") At some screenings, Exodus Cry solicited funds for the halfway houses it runs in Moldova called LightHouses, where victims of sex trafficking are given help.

== Reception ==
=== Critical response ===
Professional ratings
Review scores
Source	Rating
Movieguide	4/4 stars

Both Jim Uttley of Indian Life Newspaper and Pastor Jamie Bagley of The News of Cumberland County called Nefarious "hard-hitting". Uttley further asserted that Nefarious "is not an easy film to watch because it deals with a subject that most of us would rather ignore", and he went on to highly recommend the film. Jimmy Stewart of Charisma reported that the film gives a human face to trafficking statistics and instils a desire in the viewer to put an end to such criminal activity. Ted Baehr of Movieguide, a Christian magazine, called the film "a powerful, compelling and transformational documentary about human trafficking and sex slavery" and wrote that it was amazing that the film covered an inherently sexual topic both honestly and without nudity. Baehr praised the cinematography, editing, and filmmaking, but criticized some portions of the film as being repetitive and uncompelling. The Movieguide review ends by comparing the film's opposition to modern slavery to the death of Saint Telemachus, which put an end to gladiatorial games in ancient Rome. Erica Yunghans of Star News Daily called the film "controversial".

In News Weekly, Babette Francis called Nefarious a "ground-breaking documentary". Tiffany Owens of World, a Christian magazine, praised the film, describing its storytelling as compelling and vivid. Jamie Rake of The Phantom Tollbooth called the film "an engrossing, sometimes appropriately gross, exposé [that] sounds a clarion cry against … modern slavery". Rake praises the re-enactments for being appropriately ominous, and for demonstrating the dehumanization and abuse that characterize sexual trafficking. He suggests that the film is a modern version of This Is the Life, a Christian television series that dealt with social issues, and that, if Nolot applied for a Motion Picture Association of America film rating, it would be given a PG-13 rating. Dan Preston of Godculture Magazine called the film "a hands-on, grimy, honest, explorative piece of journalism". Preston praised Nolot's writing and directing. Jennifer Cheng of the South China Morning Post called the film "unnerving" and wrote that it "offers a glimpse into how organized crime, abuse, greed, lust and humiliation intertwine to make human trafficking possible."

=== Accolades ===
Year	Nominee / work	Award	Result
2011	Nefarious: Merchant of Souls	Transforming Stories International Christian Film Festival Documentary Film Award	Nominated
2011	Nefarious: Merchant of Souls	Aurora Awards Documentary Issue Platinum Best of Show	Won
2011	Nefarious: Merchant of Souls	Accolade Competition Feature Documentary Award of Merit	Won
2011	Benjamin Nolot	California Film Awards Best First-Time Documentary	Won
2012	Nefarious: Merchant of Souls	Canada International Film Festival Documentary Competition Award of Excellence	Won
2012	Nefarious: Merchant of Souls	Honolulu Film Award for Best Screenplay	Won
2012	Nefarious: Merchant of Souls	Telly Awards Non-Broadcast Productions for Social Issues Silver Award	Won
2012	Nefarious: Merchant of Souls	Kingdomwood Christian Film Festival Best Documentary Feature	Won
2012	Benjamin Nolot	Kingdomwood Christian Film Festival Best Director	Won
2012	John Samuel Hanson	Kingdomwood Christian Film Festival Best Original Music	Won
2012	Matthew Dickey, Matt Egan, Steve Willis, and Michael Lienau	Kingdomwood Christian Film Festival Best Cinematography	Won
2012	Nefarious: Merchant of Souls	Moondance International Film Festival Feature Film Documentary Seahorse† Award	Won
2012	Nefarious: Merchant of Souls	Urban Mediamakers Film Festival Best Documentary Feature Award	Won
2012	Nefarious: Merchant of Souls	Indie Fest Feature Documentary Award of Excellence	Won

† Seahorse Awards are given to male writers, composers, and filmmakers.

== See also ==
- Human trafficking in Sweden
- Office to Monitor and Combat Trafficking in Persons
- Transnational efforts to prevent human trafficking
- United Nations Global Initiative to Fight Human Trafficking
- Victims of Trafficking and Violence Protection Act of 2000
