= JIJ =

JIJ may refer to:

- Jerusalem Institute of Justice, a Human rights nonprofit organization operating in Israel
- Jijiga Airport, an airport in the Somali Region of Ethiopia
