= Heinz Starke =

German politician (1911–2001)

Minister of Finance
- In office 14 November 1961 – 19 November 1962
- Chancellor: Konrad Adenauer
- Preceded by: Franz Etzel
- Succeeded by: Rolf Dahlgrün

Member of the Bundestag; from Bavaria
- In office 6 October 1953 – 4 November 1980
- Preceded by: Arno Behrisch
- Succeeded by: Ortwin Lowack
- Constituency: Hof (1953–1957); State list (1957–1976); Bayreuth (1976–1980)

Personal details
- Born: 27 February 1911 Schweidnitz, Germany
- Died: 31 January 2001 (aged 89) Bonn, Germany
- Party: Christian Social Union (after 1970)
- Other political affiliations: FDP (1953–1970)
- Education: University of Jena

Heinz Starke (27 February 1911 – 31 January 2001) was a German politician. He was born in Schweidnitz, Silesia. He was Minister of Finance of West Germany from 1961 to 1962. He was a member of the Bundestag from 1953 to 1980 representing the district of Hof from 1953 to 1957 and Bayreuth from 1976 to 1980.
