= Petra Ernstberger =

German politician

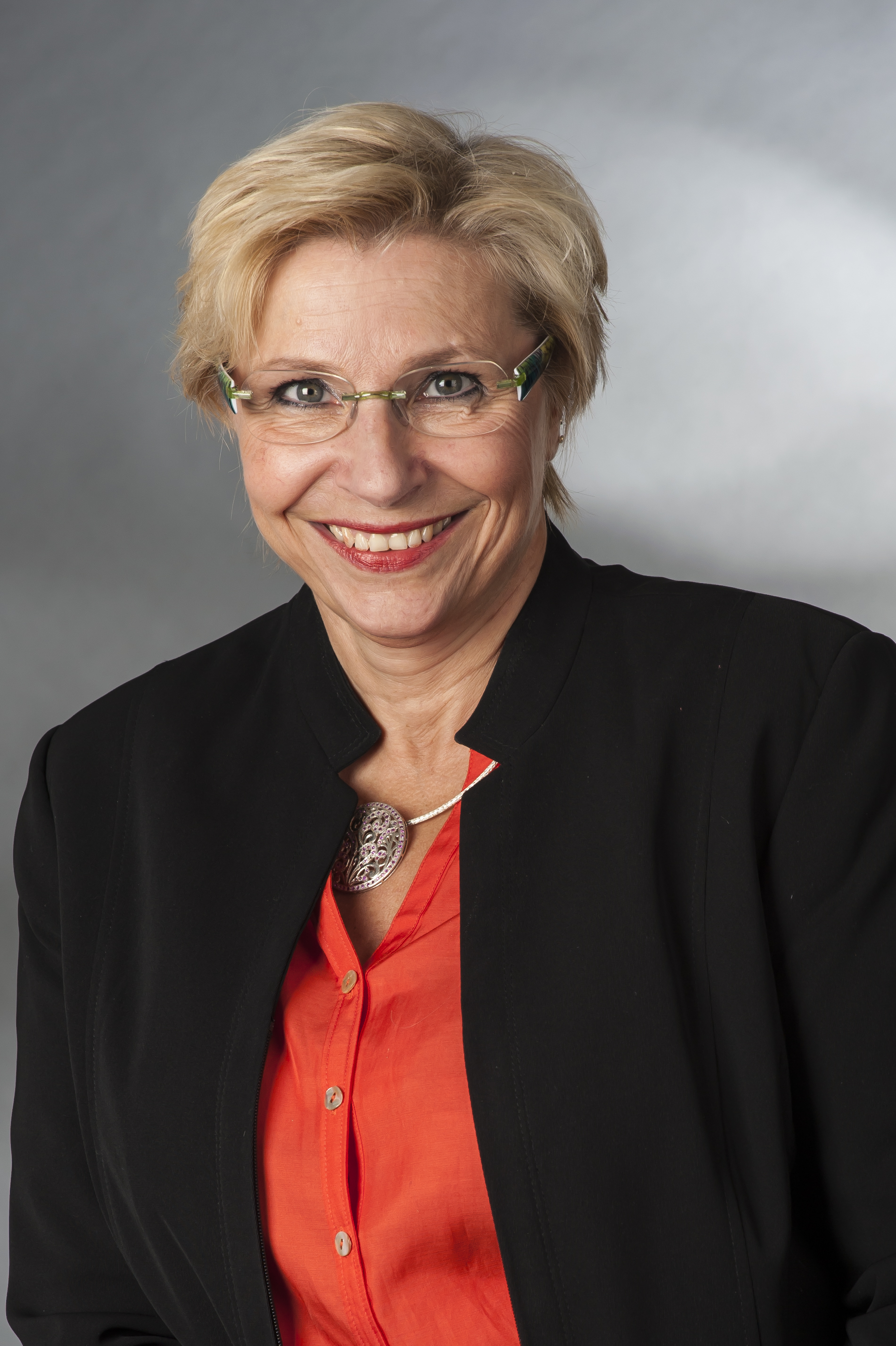
- Ernstberger in 2014

Member of the Bundestag; from Bavaria
- In office 10 November 1994 – 24 October 2017
- Constituency: State list (1994–1998); Hof (1998–2002); State list (2002–2017)

Personal details
- Born: Petra Rosenberger; 11 November 1955 (age 70) Remscheid, West Germany
- Party: Social Democratic
- Children: 2
- Education: University of Bayreuth

Petra Ernstberger (born 11 November 1955) is a German politician and former member of the German Bundestag for 23 years.

== Early life and career ==
Born in Remscheid in 1955, Ernstberger graduated from high school in 1975. She then studied at the University of Bayreuth to become an elementary school teacher, working in that career after graduation. From 1990 to 1994, she was a research assistant at the University of Bayreuth.

== Political career ==
Ernstberger joined the Social Democratic Party of Germany (SDP) in 1990 and was elected to the Bundestag on the SPD party list in 1994. She was then elected to the Bundestag representing Hof, Bavaria in 1998. In 1996, she became chair of the German-Czech Parliamentary Group, having grown up 17 kilometers (10.5 miles) from the Czech border.

She left the Bundestag in 2017 after withdrawing her candidacy, citing fear of the SPD losing the seat.

== Personal life ==
Ernstberger is divorced and has two sons and two granddaughters.

== Awards ==
- Order of Merit of the Federal Republic of Germany
- Bavarian Order of Merit
- German-Czech Art Prize
