= Hans-Peter Friedrich =

German politician (born 1957)

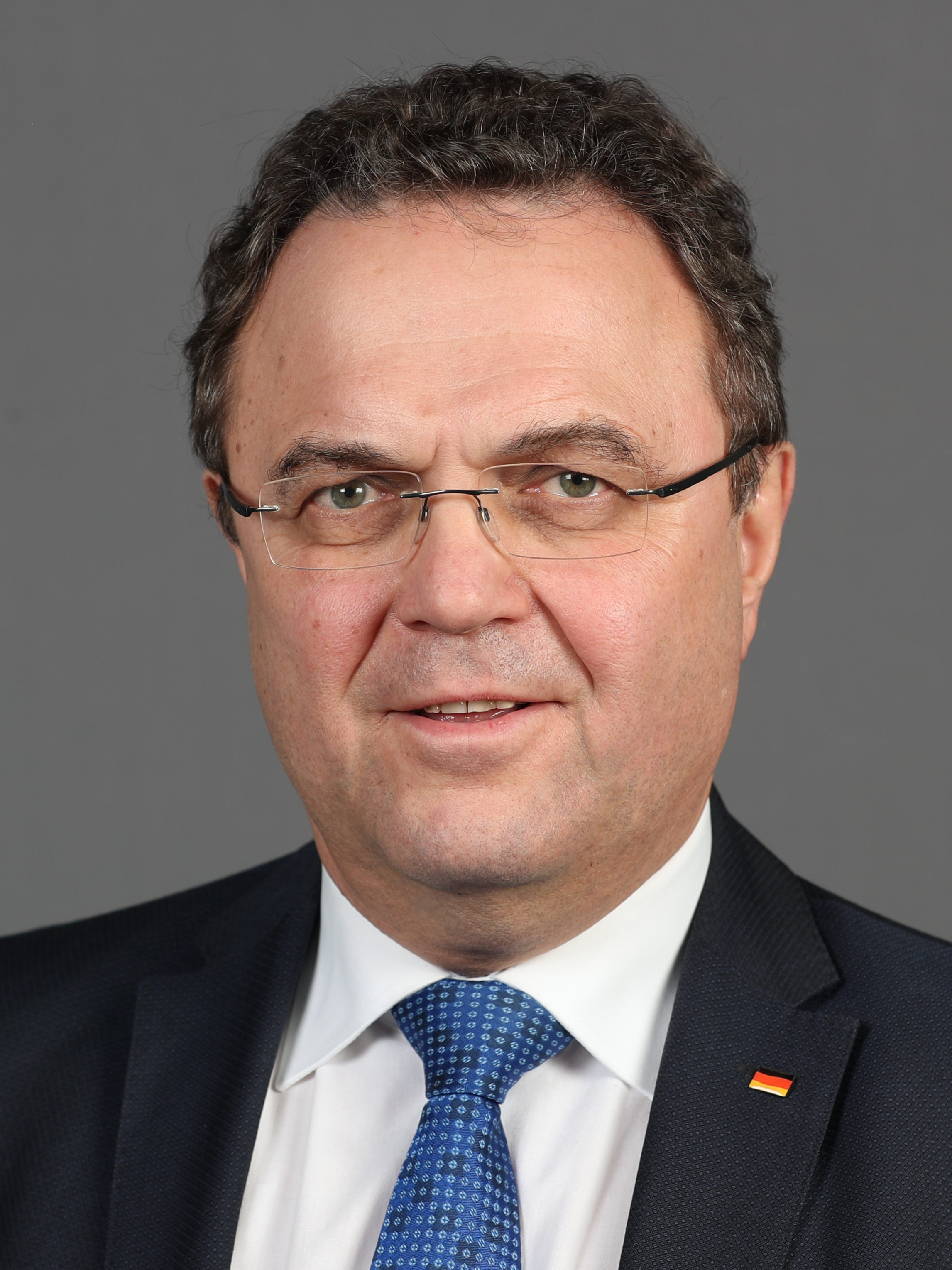

Vice President of the Bundestag (on proposal of the CDU/CSU-faction)
- In office 24 October 2017 – 26 October 2021
- Preceded by: Johannes Singhammer
- Succeeded by: Yvonne Magwas

Minister of Food and Agriculture
- In office 30 September 2013 – 17 February 2014
- Chancellor: Angela Merkel
- Preceded by: Ilse Aigner
- Succeeded by: Christian Schmidt

Minister of the Interior
- In office 3 March 2011 – 17 December 2013
- Chancellor: Angela Merkel
- Preceded by: Thomas de Maizière
- Succeeded by: Thomas de Maizière

First Deputy Leader of the CDU/CSU Group in the Bundestag
- In office 28 October 2009 – 3 March 2011
- Leader: Volker Kauder
- Preceded by: Peter Ramsauer
- Succeeded by: Gerda Hasselfeldt

Member of the Bundestag; from Bavaria
- In office 26 October 1998 – 25 March 2025
- Preceded by: Multi-member district
- Succeeded by: Heiko Hain
- Constituency: State list (1998–2002); Hof (2002–2025)

Personal details
- Born: 10 March 1957 (age 69) Naila, West Germany
- Party: Christian Social Union
- Children: 3
- Education: University of Augsburg

Hans-Peter Friedrich (born 10 March 1957) is a German politician of the Christian Social Union (CSU) who has been serving as a member of the German Bundestag from 1998 to 2025 . Under the leadership of Chancellor Angela Merkel, he served as Federal Minister of the Interior (2011–2013) and as Minister for Food and Agriculture (2013). Friedrich resigned from that position in February 2014. Friedrich has a controversial history with minorities in Germany, causing outrage in 2013 after telling journalists that Islam in Germany is not something supported by history at any point.

== Early life and education ==
Born in 1957 in Naila, near the northern Bavarian town of Hof, Friedrich has a PhD in law and also studied economics. From 1990 to 1991, Friedrich worked in the Federal Ministry for Economic Affairs and the economy department of the Germany Embassy in Washington, D.C.

== Political career ==
=== Early career ===
Friedrich began his national political career as an aide to Michael Glos, a senior CSU official in parliament.

Friedrich has been a member of the Bundestag since the 1998 federal elections,. He was deputy chairman of the investigating committee for party donations from 1999 until 2002 and for electoral fraud from 2002 until 2004. From 2002 until 2005 he was also judicial counselor of the CDU/CSU parliamentary group.

Following the 2005 federal elections, when his party joined a Grand Coalition with Angela Merkel as Chancellor, Friedrich became deputy chairman of the parliamentary group under the leadership of Volker Kauder, covering the portfolio of housing and development. Between 2007 and 2009, he was one of 32 members of the Second Commission on the modernization of the federal state, which had been established to reform the division of powers between federal and state authorities in Germany.

In the negotiations to form a coalition government following the 2009 federal elections, Friedrich led the CDU/CSU delegation in the working group on transport and building policies; his co-chair from the FDP was Patrick Döring.

From 2009, Friedrich led the CSU in parliament, replacing Peter Ramsauer. During that time, he was said to have enjoyed a good relationship with Merkel and to have often sided with national interests over Bavarian ones. Economic policy was widely seen as his passion as he has supported raising the retirement age to 67 despite opposition from CSU leader Horst Seehofer. He also played a behind-the-scenes part in crafting Germany's response to the euro zone crisis.

=== Federal Minister of the Interior (2011–2013) ===
On 3 March 2011 Friedrich succeeded Thomas de Maizière as Federal Minister of the Interior who replaced Karl-Theodor zu Guttenberg. The fact that Friedrich, like Guttenberg, came from the northern Bavarian area of Upper Franconia meant that his appointment ensured the regional balance of power within the CSU was maintained.

On the occasion of the sixtieth anniversary of the diplomatic relations between German and India, Friedrich participated in the first joint cabinet meeting of the two countries’ governments in Delhi in May 2011. On 7 June 2011 he attended the state dinner hosted by President Barack Obama in honor of Chancellor Angela Merkel at the White House.

==== European integration ====
In early 2012, Friedrich became Chancellor Angela Merkel’s first Cabinet member to suggest Greece’s exit from the euro. In an interview with Der Spiegel, he said Greece would have better chances of overhauling its economy and restoring growth if it left the euro area.

In late 2012, Friedrich called for the immediate suspension of the visa-free regime for Serbia and Macedonia after more than 7,000 citizens of the two countries applied for asylum in Germany within one year.

==== Surveillance ====
In the wake of the US National Security Agency's (NSA) internet surveillance scandal around PRISM in 2013, Friedrich was long perceived as not particularly devoted to investigating the full scope of NSA spying activities in Germany. Instead, he defended the NSA's methods and promptly demanded legislation changes, in order to be able to expand surveillance of communication traffic by the German Bundesnachrichtendienst as well. In an effort to point out how valuable information provided by the NSA can be for Germany, he argued that forty-five terror attacks had been prevented by the Prism program, including five in Germany; however, he soon back-peddled, unable to pinpoint the five instances. In a later interview with Münchner Merkur newspaper, Friedrich held that Edward Snowden was not a victim of political persecution.

=== Federal Minister of Food and Agriculture (2013–2014) ===
In the negotiations to form a so-called Grand Coalition following the 2013 federal elections, Friedrich led the CDU/CSU delegation in the working group on internal affairs and justice; his co-chair from the SPD was Thomas Oppermann.

Friedrich was sworn in as Federal Minister of Food and Agriculture in the third cabinet of Federal Chancellor Angela Merkel on 17 December 2013. He resigned on 14 February 2014, reacting to imminent legal investigations into incidents during his tenure as Federal Minister of the Interior. He was accused of betraying state secrets about legal investigations into heads of the Social Democratic Party (SPD) during the coalition negotiations after the federal elections in 2013. Prosecutors complained that the leak may have compromised their inquiry. The investigations showed MP Sebastian Edathy's link to a globally-operating child pornography syndicate, and plans to take up an investigation against Edathy on suspicion of possessing such material.

=== Later career ===
Following the 2017 elections, Friedrich was elected as one of the vice presidents of the German Parliament, under the leadership of President Wolfgang Schäuble. In this capacity, he also joined the parliament's Council of Elders, which – among other duties – determines daily legislative agenda items and assigns committee chairpersons based on party representation.

In 2020, Friedrich co-founded the "China-Bridge" initiative, a non-profit networking association to strengthen links between Germany and China.

In 2024, Friedrich announced that he would not stand in the 2025 federal elections but instead resign from active politics by the end of the parliamentary term.

== Other activities ==
=== Corporate boards ===
- Friedrich-Baur-GmbH, Member of the Advisory Board
- Münchener Verein, Member of the Supervisory Board

=== Non-profit organizations ===
- German Association for Small and Medium-Sized Businesses (BVMW), Member of the Political Advisory Board
- Atlantik-Brücke, Member
- German Council on Foreign Relations (DGAP), Member
- Foundation for Family Businesses, Member of the Board of Trustees
- German-Hungarian Youth Office, Member of the Board of Trustees
- Ostbayerisches Technologie-Transfer-Institut (OTTI), Member of the Advisory Board
- Stiftung Datenschutz, Member of the Strategic Advisory Board
- Rotary International, Member

== Personal life ==
Friedrich is married with three children.

== See also ==
- List of Bavarian Christian Social Union politicians

Political offices
Preceded by Thomas de Maizière	Minister of the Interior; 2011–2013	Succeeded by Thomas de Maizière
Preceded by Ilse Aigner as Minister of Food, Agriculture and Consumer Protection	Minister of Food and Agriculture; 2013–2014	Succeeded by Christian Schmidt
