= Heiko Hain =

German politician (born 1982)

Heiko Hain MdB
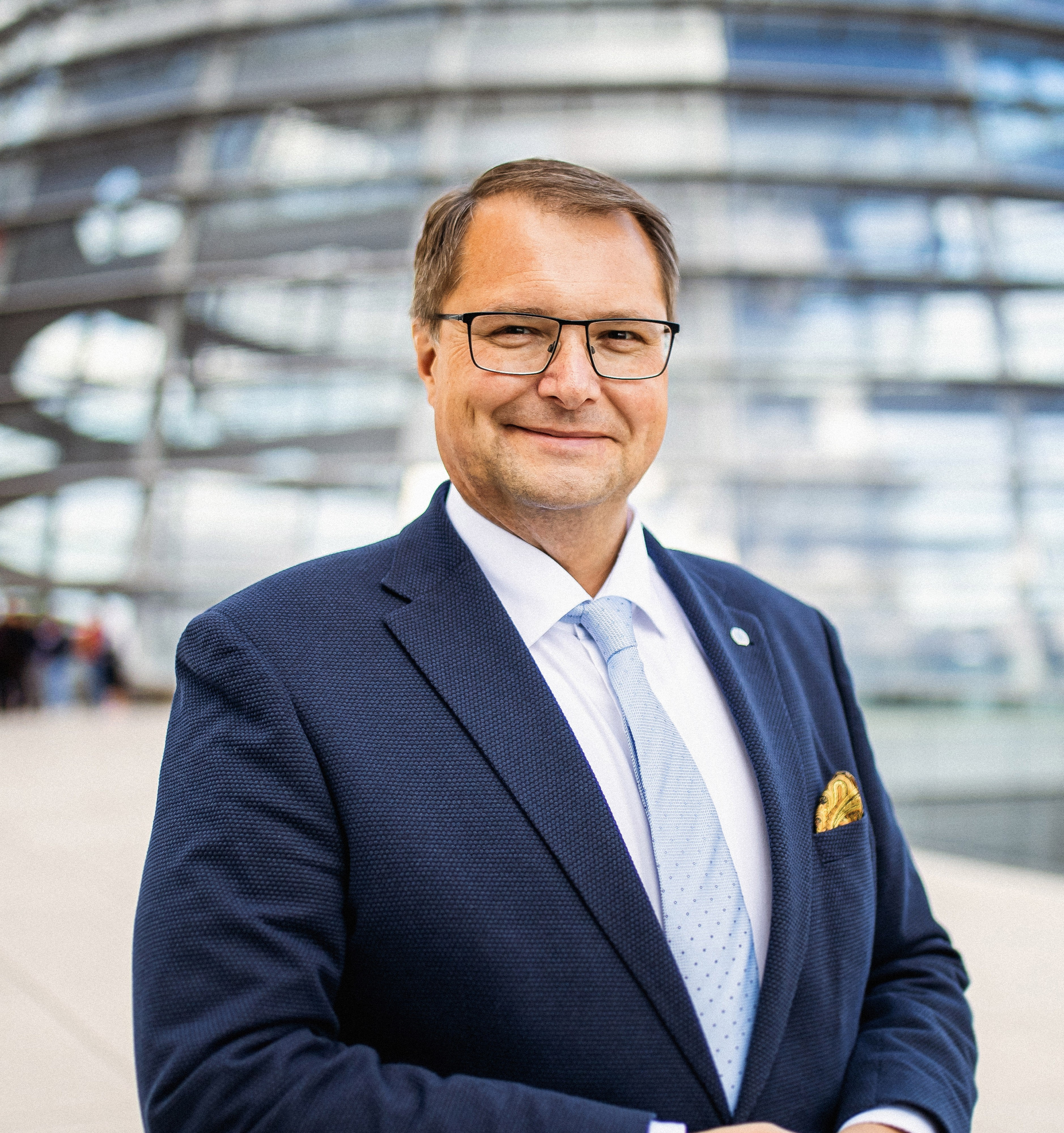
- Hain in 2026

Member of the Bundestag; for Hof
- Incumbent
- Assumed office 25 March 2025
- Preceded by: Hans-Peter Friedrich

Personal details
- Born: 26 March 1982 (age 44) Münchberg, West Germany
- Party: Christian Social Union (since 1999)
- Education: University of Hagen

Heiko Hain (born 26 March 1982) is a German politician who was elected as a member of the Bundestag in 2025. He has served as mayor of Weißdorf since 2014.
