= Project Spade =

2010 child pornography investigation

- Operation name: Project Spade
- Type: Child pornography crackdown

Participants
- Planned by: Canada, and United States
- Executed by: Canada, Australia, South Africa, Spain, Sweden, Greece, Ireland, New Zealand, Norway, United States
- No. of countries participating: 50

Mission
- Target: Azov Films

Timeline
- Date begin: October 2010
- Date executed: May 2011

Results
- Arrests: 348

Project Spade was an international police investigation into child pornography, began in October 2010 in Toronto, Canada. The investigation started when Toronto Police Service officers made on-line contact with a man who was alleged to have been sharing pornographic videos via the Internet and by mail. The investigation eventually covered over 50 countries. 348 people were arrested internationally, and 386 children were said to have been rescued. The primary producers were Igor Rusanov and Andrey Ivanov in Crimea, Ukraine, Markus Roth in Romania, and Paul Kruger in Germany.

== Investigation ==
Following numerous complaints received by the website cybertip.ca about Azov Films, the investigation began in October 2010 when undercover police made online contact with Brian Way, a 42-year-old man from Toronto and the owner of Toronto-based Azov Films, a firm that distributed DVDs and streaming videos of naked children which it marketed as "naturist."

In May 2011, Way's home and office were raided, and he was arrested. Toronto law enforcement authorities and the U.S. Postal Inspection Service recreated Way's customer records and shared them with the Royal Canadian Mounted Police and Interpol. Investigations involved more than 50 countries. Way is alleged to have earned more than $4 million from his website.

Apart from Canada, Australia and the United States, authorities in Hong Kong, South Africa, Spain and Sweden were involved. Investigations also spread to Greece, Ireland, New Zealand, and Norway.

The Canadian arm of the operation was "Project Spade"; in Australia, it was "Operation Thunderer". Up to 45 terabytes of images and videos were seized.

Inspector Joanna Beaven-Desjardins, of the TPS' Sex Crimes Unit, said, "It's a first for the magnitude of the victims saved" and "the amount of arrests internationally, also a first." Beaven-Desjardins also spoke about materials seized from Way's home: "Officers located hundreds of thousands of images and videos detailing horrific sexual acts against very young children, some of the worst that they have ever viewed." The materials distributed commercially by Azov featured nude athletic and recreational scenes, but not explicit sexual acts. The nudity-only nature of the Azov material caused it to be classified in the UK as level 1 on the COPINE scale for rating images of children, i.e., generally beneath the threshold of legal interest. This standardized rating caused controversy, as politicians and members of the UK press later accused the National Crime Agency of negligence.

The investigation was officially made public in November 2013. Alternative news sources had disclosed its existence as early as December 2012.

=== Germany ===
The German Federal Criminal Police Office was informed in October 2011, but investigations only started in October 2012, with the list of customers being distributed to the German states' authorities in November 2012. During 13 months of holding back any investigations it should have been obvious for Federal Criminal Police Office that within the list there were IP-numbers of Deutscher Bundestag with at least several downloads of nude material of boys between the ages of 9 and 14 towards the German Bundestag IP-numbers range.

Five hundred of the 800 listed persons had purchased unambiguous child pornography according to German legal standards; the rest had bought material not considered to be illegal. A German MP appeared on the list; since the material he purchased wasn't categorized as clearly illegal, the case was held back pending further investigations, until 10 February 2014, when his house was raided. According to Jörg Fröhlich, public prosecutor in Hannover, Lower Saxony, the raid took place for reason of a higher count of other public prosecutor agencies handling similar cases this way against the account of agencies favoring not to do so when found material would need to be categorized as so-called "II" instead of "I". The passing of secret information regarding the investigation to the MP's party leader resulted in the resignation of the former German Interior Minister, Hans-Peter Friedrich.

The home raid on Edathy when he had only purchased materials classified as legal was criticized in a national newspaper, Die Zeit, in a guest editorial by Thomas Fischer, Chief Judge of the German Federal Court. He stated, "Law exists in clear boundaries between permitted and forbidden behavior. Justice dares not follow he who does nothing illegal. In the Edathy case, this rule has been violated." In contrast, however, Mick Moran, head of Interpol's Human Trafficking and Child Exploitation unit, issued a public warning on Twitter to "MAPs" ("minor-attracted persons") that any sign they were acting upon their sexual orientations, whether the actions were legal or illegal, "demonstrates an escalation of activity by 'MAPs' that must be interpreted as an increased risk to children regardless of the illegality" and that "must result in action by public safety officials."

Public discussion about nude pictures of children being legal in Germany, when not categorized as sexual in nature, led within hours to a published consent from all parliamentary parties, as well as from Germany's Minister of Justice Heiko Maas, for a prompt change of the relevant law.

On a 19 February 2014, a non-public meeting of the federal home affairs committee where BKA president Jörg Ziercke was reporting on this affair—Ziercke admitted, according to MP Bosbach—who leads that committee—towards reporters, that he had not seen any reason to publish the involved MP's name any earlier, since at that time Sebastian Edathy was head of the NSU-murderseries committee doing inquiries against the BKA and therefore himself, Ziercke, so to prevent the obviously wrong public image of a nonexisting act of revenge.

== Children ==
Apart from the children involved in the production of the Azov films, 386 children were said to have been rescued from exploitation by purchasers of the films. In Canada alone, 24 were rescued while six were rescued in Australia. "More than 330 children" were stated to have been rescued in the US. This high number has been questioned, since full details of the charges for 54 of the total of 76 arrests in the US had been publicly released as of 14 November 2013, and these details account for fewer than 15 persons exposed as children to current or historical sexual contact. An additional 75 to 100 children were surreptitiously indecently photographed, mostly by two arrested men who were school employees. The 'exploitative positions' always included nudity or genital exposure.

== Arrests ==
As of 14 November 2013, 348 people were arrested internationally. Those arrested included engineers, teachers, foster parents, doctors and nurses. A police officer and a youth baseball coach were also arrested. A Richmond, Virginia, man was sentenced to 70 months in prison on 11 April 2013, for receipt of child pornography.

In Canada alone 108 people were arrested. In the US 76 were arrested. In Australia arrests began in August 2013 and 65 persons aged from 25 to 72 were arrested. In Spain 28 were arrested in December 2012.

== Charges ==
Way was charged with 24 offenses, including "instruction of a criminal organisation" and "making, possessing, distributing and exporting child exploitation ... ", which had "explicit images of boys ranging in age from toddlers to teens." He was sentenced to ten years in prison with credit for time served. Way's mother, Sandra Waslov, was also sought by authorities. Waslov changed her name on 21 May 2010 in Orchard Park, Erie County, New York. She was captured in Washington, D.C. on 22 September 2015 and extradited back to Canada for trial.

The 65 Australian suspects faced 399 charges involving child exploitation. The charges included "accessing, possessing, producing and distributing online child exploitation material".

== Suicide of a US government official ==
One of the high-impact arrests resulting from Project Spade was that of Ryan Loskarn. The 35-year-old was chief of staff to U.S. Sen. Lamar Alexander at the time of his arrest. An investigation of Loskarn's electronic equipment was prompted in part by the appearance of his name on the Azov Films customer list. It uncovered graphic child pornography that had been obtained over the Gnutella peer-to-peer network Loskarn was charged with possessing and intending to distribute child pornography and released on his own recognizance five days after his arrest on 11 December 2013. On 23 January 2014, he committed suicide by hanging himself at his parents' home. In his suicide note, published on the internet by his family, he stated that "I found myself drawn to videos that matched my own childhood abuse." The incident provoked wide discussion in Washington, with The Washington Post opinion writer Ruth Marcus suggesting that "we should use this sad episode to call attention to the need for mental health services—although Loskarn's problem was not lack of access but lack of willingness to accept the help available . . . But we should also use the moment to remind ourselves that reality is more complex than our cursory assumptions acknowledge, and that before we rush to condemn we might pause to consider the possibility of compassion."

== Suicide of Martin Goldberg ==
Martin Goldberg, a deputy headteacher in Essex, hanged himself after being investigated following information uncovered in Canada. Approximately 75 indecent images of children were found in his possession from his schools' changing rooms; 465 were taken at the swimming pools of his local leisure centre and 38 from other locations.

The headteacher of the school that he worked at said that he felt "utter shock and betrayal" about Goldberg's behavior, which had been brought to the attention of Essex Police in 2013.

== See also ==
- 2007 international child pornography investigation
- Operation Avalanche (child pornography investigation) – 1999
- Operation Delego – 2009
