= Hof (electoral district) =

Federal electoral district of Germany

238 Hof
- Electoral district for the Bundestag
- Hof in 2025
- State: Bavaria
- Population: 210,600 (2019)
- Electorate: 157,915 (2025)
- Major settlements: Hof; Marktredwitz; Selb
- Area: 1,541.3 km^{2}

Current electoral district
- Created: 1949
- Party: CSU
- Member: Heiko Hain
- Elected: 2025

Hof is an electoral constituency (German: Wahlkreis) represented in the Bundestag. It elects one member via first-past-the-post voting. Under the current constituency numbering system, it is designated as constituency 238. It is located in northeastern Bavaria, comprising the city of Hof and the districts of Landkreis Hof and Wunsiedel.

Hof was created for the inaugural 1949 federal election. Since 2025, it has been represented by Heiko Hain of the Christian Social Union (CSU).

== Geography ==
Hof is located in northeastern Bavaria. As of the 2021 federal election, it comprises the independent city of Hof, the Wunsiedel district, and the entirety of the Hof district excluding the municipality of Geroldsgrün.

== History ==
Hof was created in 1949. In the 1949 election, it was Bavaria constituency 28 in the numbering system. In the 1953 through 1961 elections, it was number 223. In the 1965 through 1998 elections, it was number 225. In the 2002 and 2005 elections, it was number 240. In the 2009 through 2021 elections, it was number 239. From the 2025 election, it has been number 238.

Originally, the constituency comprised the independent cities of Hof and Selb and the districts of Landkreis Hof, Münchberg, and Rehau. In the 1965 through 1972 elections, it also contained the Naila district. In the 1976 through 2013 elections, it comprised the city of Hof and the districts of Landkreis Hof and Wunsiedel. It lost the municipality of Geroldsgrün in the 2017 election.

| Election | No. | Name | Borders |
|---|---|---|---|
| 1949 | 28 | Hof | Hof city; Selb city; Landkreis Hof district; Münchberg district; Rehau district |
| 1953 | 223 | Hof | Hof city; Selb city; Landkreis Hof district; Münchberg district; Rehau district |
| 1957 | 223 | Hof | Hof city; Selb city; Landkreis Hof district; Münchberg district; Rehau district |
| 1961 | 223 | Hof | Hof city; Selb city; Landkreis Hof district; Münchberg district; Rehau district |
| 1965 | 225 | Hof | Hof city; Selb city; Landkreis Hof district; Münchberg district; Rehau district; Naila district |
| 1969 | 225 | Hof | Hof city; Selb city; Landkreis Hof district; Münchberg district; Rehau district; Naila district |
| 1972 | 225 | Hof | Hof city; Selb city; Landkreis Hof district; Münchberg district; Rehau district; Naila district |
| 1976 | 225 | Hof | Hof city; Landkreis Hof district; Wunsiedel district |
| 1980 | 225 | Hof | Hof city; Landkreis Hof district; Wunsiedel district |
| 1983 | 225 | Hof | Hof city; Landkreis Hof district; Wunsiedel district |
| 1987 | 225 | Hof | Hof city; Landkreis Hof district; Wunsiedel district |
| 1990 | 225 | Hof | Hof city; Landkreis Hof district; Wunsiedel district |
| 1994 | 225 | Hof | Hof city; Landkreis Hof district; Wunsiedel district |
| 1998 | 225 | Hof | Hof city; Landkreis Hof district; Wunsiedel district |
| 2002 | 240 | Hof | Hof city; Landkreis Hof district; Wunsiedel district |
| 2005 | 240 | Hof | Hof city; Landkreis Hof district; Wunsiedel district |
| 2009 | 239 | Hof | Hof city; Landkreis Hof district; Wunsiedel district |
| 2013 | 239 | Hof | Hof city; Landkreis Hof district; Wunsiedel district |
| 2017 | 239 | Hof | Hof city; Landkreis Hof district (excluding Geroldsgrün municipality); Wunsiedel district |
| 2021 | 239 | Hof | Hof city; Landkreis Hof district (excluding Geroldsgrün municipality); Wunsiedel district |
| 2025 | 238 | Hof | Hof city; Landkreis Hof district (excluding Geroldsgrün municipality); Wunsiedel district |

== Members ==
The constituency was first represented by Arno Behrisch of the Social Democratic Party (SPD) from 1949 to 1953. Heinz Starke won it in 1953; he was elected for the Free Democratic Party (FDP) with the endorsement of the Christian Social Union (CSU). Gerhard Wacher of the CSU was elected in 1957 and served until 1961. Martin Hirsch of the SPD won the constituency in 1961 and served three terms. He was succeeded by Hans Büchler from 1972 to 1983. Jürgen Warnke of the CSU then served from 1983 to 1998, when Petra Ernstberger of the SPD was elected. Hans-Peter Friedrich of the CSU was elected in 2002, and re-elected in 2005, 2009, 2013, 2017, and 2021. Heiko Hain retained the seat for the CSU in 2025.

| Election | Member | Party | % |
|---|---|---|---|
| 1949 | Arno Behrisch | SPD | 35.0 |
| 1953 | Heinz Starke | FDP | 44.6 |
| 1957 | Gerhard Wacher | CSU | 46.5 |
| 1961 | Martin Hirsch | SPD | 44.0 |
| 1965 | Martin Hirsch | SPD | 46.8 |
| 1969 | Martin Hirsch | SPD | 45.8 |
| 1972 | Hans Büchler | SPD | 52.0 |
| 1976 | Hans Büchler | SPD | 48.7 |
| 1980 | Hans Büchler | SPD | 48.3 |
| 1983 | Jürgen Warnke | CSU | 54.2 |
| 1987 | Jürgen Warnke | CSU | 51.5 |
| 1990 | Jürgen Warnke | CSU | 52.1 |
| 1994 | Jürgen Warnke | CSU | 50.4 |
| 1998 | Petra Ernstberger | SPD | 49.5 |
| 2002 | Hans-Peter Friedrich | CSU | 53.6 |
| 2005 | Hans-Peter Friedrich | CSU | 50.1 |
| 2009 | Hans-Peter Friedrich | CSU | 46.5 |
| 2013 | Hans-Peter Friedrich | CSU | 55.1 |
| 2017 | Hans-Peter Friedrich | CSU | 47.0 |
| 2021 | Hans-Peter Friedrich | CSU | 41.2 |
| 2025 | Heiko Hain | CSU | 40.4 |

== Election results ==
=== 2025 election ===
Federal election (2025): Hof
| Notes: | Blue background denotes the winner of the electorate vote. Pink background denotes a candidate elected from their party list. Yellow background denotes an electorate win by a list member, or other incumbent. A ✓ or ✗ denotes status of any incumbent, win or lose respectively. | | | | | | |
| Party | Candidate | Votes | % | ±% | Party votes | % | ±% |
|---|---|---|---|---|---|---|---|
| CSU | Heiko Hain | 51,926 | 40.4 | ▼0.9 | 48,966 | 38.0 | ▲4.8 |
| AfD | Oliver Koller | 30,614 | 23.8 | ▲12.0 | 31,308 | 24.3 | ▲12.6 |
| SPD | Jörg Mathias Nürnberger | 22,966 | 17.8 | ▼6.1 | 17,420 | 13.5 | ▼10.9 |
| Greens | Dr. Harald Jürgen Schmalfuß | 6,392 | 5.0 | ▼1.4 | 7,802 | 6.0 | ▼1.7 |
| FW | Thomas Schinner | 6,174 | 4.8 | ▼1.0 | 4,773 | 3.7 | ▼2.7 |
| BSW | | | | | 4,622 | 3.6 | |
| Left | Janson Damasceno da Costa e Silva | 5,790 | 4.5 | ▲2.4 | 6,848 | 5.3 | ▲2.9 |
| FDP | Stefan Heindl | 3,165 | 2.5 | ▼2.8 | 4,031 | 3.1 | ▼5.3 |
| Tierschutzpartei | | | | | 1,173 | 0.9 | ▼0.5 |
| Volt | Manuel Jahn | 997 | 0.8 | | 547 | 0.4 | ▲0.3 |
| PARTEI | | | | | 439 | 0.3 | ▼0.7 |
| dieBasis | | | | | 382 | 0.3 | ▼0.8 |
| ÖDP | | | | | 236 | 0.2 | ▼0.1 |
| BD | Michael Angles | 638 | 0.5 | | 219 | 0.2 | |
| BP | | | | | 130 | 0.1 | ▼0.1 |
| Humanists | | | | | 81 | 0.1 | |
| MLPD | | | | | 23 | 0.0 | |
| Informal votes | | 790 | | | 452 | | |
| Total valid votes | | 128,662 | | | 129,000 | | |
| Turnout | | 129,452 | 82.0 | ▲5.0 | | | |
| CSU hold | Majority | 21,312 | 16.6 | ▼0.7 | | | |

=== 2021 election ===
Federal election (2021): Hof
| Notes: | Blue background denotes the winner of the electorate vote. Pink background denotes a candidate elected from their party list. Yellow background denotes an electorate win by a list member, or other incumbent. A ✓ or ✗ denotes status of any incumbent, win or lose respectively. | | | | | | |
| Party | Candidate | Votes | % | ±% | Party votes | % | ±% |
|---|---|---|---|---|---|---|---|
| CSU | ✓ Hans-Peter Friedrich | 51,312 | 41.2 | ▼5.8 | 41,308 | 33.2 | ▼5.6 |
| SPD | Jörg Nürnberger | 29,763 | 23.9 | ▲0.4 | 30,426 | 24.4 | ▲2.3 |
| AfD | Gerd Kögler | 14,705 | 11.8 | 0.0 | 14,560 | 11.7 | ▼1.5 |
| Greens | Ralf Reusch | 7,941 | 6.4 | ▲1.7 | 9,628 | 7.7 | ▲2.2 |
| FW | Thomas Schinner | 7,202 | 5.8 | ▲3.1 | 7,955 | 6.4 | ▲3.8 |
| FDP | Gabriel Wölfel | 6,493 | 5.2 | ▲1.5 | 10,552 | 8.5 | ▲0.6 |
| Left | Janson Damasceno da Costa e Silva | 2,651 | 2.1 | ▼2.3 | 3,004 | 2.4 | ▼3.3 |
| Tierschutzpartei | | | | | 1,780 | 1.4 | ▲0.4 |
| PARTEI | Steffen Pokorny | 1,969 | 1.6 | ▲0.6 | 1,268 | 1.0 | 0.0 |
| dieBasis | Walter Kunisch | 1,498 | 1.2 | | 1,339 | 1.1 | |
| Team Todenhöfer | | | | | 399 | 0.3 | |
| Pirates | | | | | 374 | 0.3 | ▼0.1 |
| ÖDP | Roland Müller | 508 | 0.4 | | 318 | 0.3 | 0.0 |
| BP | | | | | 295 | 0.2 | 0.0 |
| Bündnis C | Verena Thümmel | 314 | 0.3 | 0.0 | 255 | 0.2 | |
| Unabhängige | | | | | 228 | 0.2 | |
| NPD | | | | | 172 | 0.1 | ▼0.3 |
| Gesundheitsforschung | | | | | 164 | 0.1 | 0.0 |
| Volt | | | | | 115 | 0.1 | |
| The III. Path | | | | | 109 | 0.1 | |
| Humanists | | | | | 106 | 0.1 | |
| Independent | Martin Löhnert | 99 | 0.1 | | | | |
| V-Partei3 | | | | | 80 | 0.1 | ▼0.1 |
| du. | | | | | 63 | 0.0 | |
| LKR | | | | | 30 | 0.0 | |
| MLPD | | | | | 16 | 0.0 | 0.0 |
| DKP | | | | | 15 | 0.0 | 0.0 |
| Informal votes | | 879 | | | 775 | | |
| Total valid votes | | 124,455 | | | 124,559 | | |
| Turnout | | 125,334 | 77.0 | ▲1.2 | | | |
| CSU hold | Majority | 21,549 | 17.3 | ▼6.2 | | | |

=== 2017 election ===
Federal election (2017): Hof
| Notes: | Blue background denotes the winner of the electorate vote. Pink background denotes a candidate elected from their party list. Yellow background denotes an electorate win by a list member, or other incumbent. A ✓ or ✗ denotes status of any incumbent, win or lose respectively. | | | | | | |
| Party | Candidate | Votes | % | ±% | Party votes | % | ±% |
|---|---|---|---|---|---|---|---|
| CSU | ✓ Hans-Peter Friedrich | 59,182 | 47.0 | ▼8.1 | 48,772 | 38.8 | ▼8.1 |
| SPD | Jörg Nürnberger | 29,641 | 23.6 | ▼5.0 | 27,775 | 22.1 | ▼4.5 |
| AfD | Michael Wüst | 14,893 | 11.8 | ▲8.3 | 16,605 | 13.2 | ▲8.8 |
| Greens | Klaus Schrader | 5,936 | 4.7 | ▼0.8 | 6,989 | 5.6 | ▲0.2 |
| Left | Ulrike-Judith Dierkes-Morsy | 5,560 | 4.4 | ▼0.1 | 7,185 | 5.7 | ▲0.9 |
| FDP | Klaus Horn | 4,716 | 3.7 | ▲2.4 | 9,890 | 7.9 | ▲4.1 |
| FW | Hans Martin Grötsch | 3,362 | 2.7 | | 3,301 | 2.6 | ▲0.4 |
| Tierschutzpartei | | | | | 1,284 | 1.0 | ▲0.1 |
| PARTEI | Carsten Warnke | 1,253 | 1.0 | | 1,260 | 1.0 | |
| NPD | | | | | 565 | 0.4 | ▼0.8 |
| Pirates | | 957 | 0.8 | | 498 | 0.4 | ▼1.5 |
| ÖDP | | | | | 381 | 0.3 | ▼0.1 |
| Bündnis C | Verena Thümmel | 358 | 0.3 | | | | |
| BP | | | | | 343 | 0.3 | ▼0.2 |
| V-Partei³ | | | | | 197 | 0.2 | |
| BGE | | | | | 184 | 0.1 | |
| Gesundheitsforschung | | | | | 176 | 0.1 | |
| DM | | | | | 172 | 0.1 | |
| DiB | | | | | 147 | 0.1 | |
| MLPD | | | | | 34 | 0.0 | 0.0 |
| BüSo | | | | | 18 | 0.0 | 0.0 |
| DKP | | | | | 16 | 0.0 | |
| Informal votes | | 1,060 | | | 1,126 | | |
| Total valid votes | | 125,858 | | | 125,792 | | |
| Turnout | | 126,918 | 75.7 | ▲7.7 | | | |
| CSU hold | Majority | 29,541 | 23.4 | ▼3.1 | | | |

=== 2013 election ===
Federal election (2013): Hof
| Notes: | Blue background denotes the winner of the electorate vote. Pink background denotes a candidate elected from their party list. Yellow background denotes an electorate win by a list member, or other incumbent. A ✓ or ✗ denotes status of any incumbent, win or lose respectively. | | | | | | |
| Party | Candidate | Votes | % | ±% | Party votes | % | ±% |
|---|---|---|---|---|---|---|---|
| CSU | ✓ Hans-Peter Friedrich | 64,888 | 55.1 | ▲8.6 | 55,219 | 46.9 | ▲5.4 |
| SPD | Petra Ernstberger | 33,731 | 28.6 | ▲1.4 | 31,406 | 26.7 | ▲3.2 |
| Greens | Elisabeth Scharfenberg | 6,449 | 5.5 | ▼2.0 | 6,315 | 5.4 | ▼1.6 |
| Left | Ulrike Dierkes-Morse | 5,264 | 4.5 | ▼3.6 | 5,619 | 4.8 | ▼3.7 |
| AfD | Hermann Klie | 4,168 | 3.5 | | 5,109 | 4.3 | |
| NPD | Moroni Blankenburg | 1,722 | 1.5 | ▼1.0 | 1,461 | 1.2 | ▼0.7 |
| FDP | Stefan Quehl | 1,527 | 1.3 | ▼6.4 | 4,418 | 3.8 | ▼7.5 |
| FW | | | | | 2,598 | 2.2 | |
| Pirates | | | | | 2,257 | 1.9 | ▲0.1 |
| Tierschutzpartei | | | | | 1,030 | 0.9 | ▲0.1 |
| BP | | | | | 597 | 0.5 | ▲0.1 |
| ÖDP | | | | | 504 | 0.4 | 0.0 |
| REP | | | | | 446 | 0.4 | ▼0.4 |
| DIE FRAUEN | | | | | 235 | 0.2 | |
| Party of Reason | | | | | 156 | 0.1 | |
| PRO | | | | | 107 | 0.1 | |
| DIE VIOLETTEN | | | | | 87 | 0.1 | ▼0.1 |
| RRP | | | | | 40 | 0.0 | ▼0.5 |
| MLPD | | | | | 19 | 0.0 | 0.0 |
| BüSo | | | | | 14 | 0.0 | ▼0.1 |
| Informal votes | | 1,089 | | | 1,201 | | |
| Total valid votes | | 117,749 | | | 117,637 | | |
| Turnout | | 118,838 | 68.1 | ▼1.7 | | | |
| CSU hold | Majority | 31,157 | 26.5 | ▲7.2 | | | |

=== 2009 election ===
Federal election (2009): Hof
| Notes: | Blue background denotes the winner of the electorate vote. Pink background denotes a candidate elected from their party list. Yellow background denotes an electorate win by a list member, or other incumbent. A ✓ or ✗ denotes status of any incumbent, win or lose respectively. | | | | | | |
| Party | Candidate | Votes | % | ±% | Party votes | % | ±% |
|---|---|---|---|---|---|---|---|
| CSU | ✓ Hans-Peter Friedrich | 57,632 | 46.5 | ▼3.7 | 51,661 | 41.5 | ▼2.6 |
| SPD | Petra Ernstberger | 33,763 | 27.2 | ▼9.9 | 29,265 | 23.5 | ▼9.4 |
| Left | Klaus Bruno Engelhardt | 9,994 | 8.1 | ▲4.3 | 10,550 | 8.5 | ▲4.1 |
| FDP | Stefan Quehl | 9,604 | 7.7 | ▲4.4 | 14,036 | 11.3 | ▲3.0 |
| Greens | Elisabeth Scharfenberg | 9,302 | 7.5 | ▲4.2 | 8,678 | 7.0 | ▲2.0 |
| NPD | Harald Bestehorn | 3,094 | 2.5 | ▲0.2 | 2,458 | 2.0 | ▲0.1 |
| Pirates | | | | | 2,248 | 1.8 | |
| Tierschutzpartei | | | | | 1,005 | 0.8 | |
| FAMILIE | | | | | 999 | 0.8 | ▲0.1 |
| REP | | | | | 916 | 0.7 | ▼0.3 |
| Independent | Heinz Wunderlich | 650 | 0.5 | | | | |
| RRP | | | | | 612 | 0.5 | |
| PBC | | | | | 511 | 0.4 | ▼0.2 |
| BP | | | | | 487 | 0.4 | 0.0 |
| ÖDP | | | | | 484 | 0.4 | |
| DIE VIOLETTEN | | | | | 167 | 0.1 | |
| CM | | | | | 111 | 0.1 | |
| DVU | | | | | 93 | 0.1 | |
| BüSo | | | | | 49 | 0.0 | 0.0 |
| MLPD | | | | | 31 | 0.0 | 0.0 |
| Informal votes | | 2,057 | | | 1,735 | | |
| Total valid votes | | 124,039 | | | 124,361 | | |
| Turnout | | 126,096 | 69.8 | ▼6.1 | | | |
| CSU hold | Majority | 23,869 | 19.3 | ▲6.2 | | | |

=== 2005 election ===
Federal election (2005):Hof
| Notes: | Blue background denotes the winner of the electorate vote. Pink background denotes a candidate elected from their party list. Yellow background denotes an electorate win by a list member, or other incumbent. A ✓ or ✗ denotes status of any incumbent, win or lose respectively. | | | | | | |
| Party | Candidate | Votes | % | ±% | Party votes | % | ±% |
|---|---|---|---|---|---|---|---|
| CSU | ✓ Hans-Peter Friedrich | 69,788 | 50.1 | ▼3.5 | 61,441 | 44.1 | ▼9.1 |
| SPD | Petra Ernstberger | 51,635 | 37.1 | ▼1.8 | 45,909 | 33.0 | ▼2.0 |
| Left | Stephan Glaser | 5,289 | 3.8 | ▲3.0 | 6,105 | 4.4 | ▲3.7 |
| Greens | Elisabethe Scharfenberg | 4,623 | 3.3 | ▲0.5 | 7,001 | 5.0 | ▲0.6 |
| FDP | Timo Pohl | 4,601 | 3.3 | ▲0.5 | 11,519 | 8.3 | ▲4.4 |
| NPD | Hermann Schwede | 3,224 | 2.3 | | 2,609 | 1.9 | ▲1.7 |
| REP | | | | | 1,421 | 1.0 | ▲0.2 |
| Familie | | | | | 974 | 0.7 | |
| PBC | | | | | 807 | 0.6 | ▲0.2 |
| GRAUEN | | | | | 513 | 0.4 | ▲0.2 |
| BP | | | | | 496 | 0.4 | ▲0.3 |
| Feminist | | | | | 386 | 0.3 | ▲0.2 |
| BüSo | | | | | 98 | 0.1 | ▲0.1 |
| MLPD | | | | | 47 | 0.0 | |
| Informal votes | | 2,403 | | | 2,237 | | |
| Total valid votes | | 139,160 | | | 139,326 | | |
| Turnout | | 141,563 | 75.8 | ▼4.0 | | | |
| CSU hold | Majority | 18,153 | 13 | | | | |
