= Benjamin Nolot =

American filmmaker

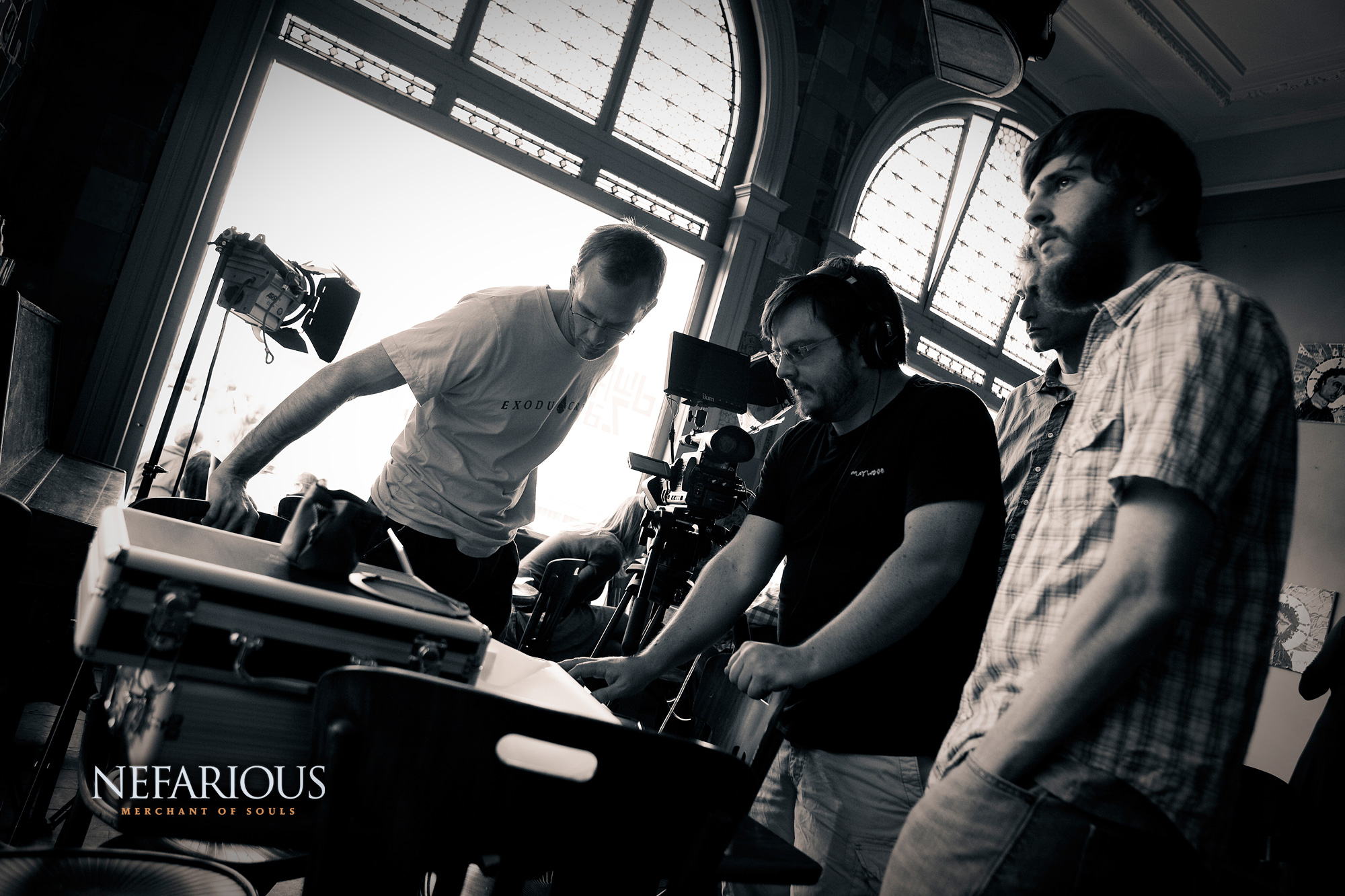
- Nolot (left) working on Nefarious: Merchant of Souls with other members of the film crew
- Born: November 12, 1976 (age 49)
- Occupation: Filmmaker
- Years active: 2007–present
- Organization: Exodus Cry
- Known for: Nefarious: Merchant of Souls

Benjamin Nolot is an American filmmaker and the CEO and founder of Exodus Cry, a Christian social activist group focused on the issue of human trafficking which has expressed opposition to the "entire global sex industry, including prostitution, pornography, and stripping". Nolot has also been involved with an International House of Prayer ministry which is based in Sacramento, California.

== Career ==
Nolot has written, directed, and produced several films. His directing and producing credits include: Nefarious: Merchant of Souls (2011), Liberated: The New Sexual Revolution (2017), Spring Break Emcees (2017), Seattle’s Bikini Baristas (2019), and Existence (2020). He wrote Nefarious, Liberated, and Seattle’s Bikini Baristas. Nolot also acted in the short film Existence.

=== Nefarious: Merchant of Souls ===
Nolot wrote, directed, produced, and narrated Nefarious: Merchant of Souls, a documentary film about human trafficking. He also conducted the interviews in the film, speaking with such people as a police officer and a pimp. Other scenes depict Nolot doing things like chasing a pedophile out of a town in which he was trying to purchase the right to sexually abuse a child. The film was distributed by Exodus Cry. Nefarious was Nolot's film debut. Filming started in 2007. Nolot travelled to 19 different countries to collect the film's content. These filming locations included countries in the Middle East, Europe, North America, and Asia. Nolot attested to having found producing the film difficult because of the subject matter; he stated that "there is not a day that goes by that I am not mindful of the horrific tragedies we uncovered". He further said that he did not make the film in order to make money or gain fame, but rather, to rouse people to action against human trafficking, an issue he finds both personal and important. Dan Preston of Godculture Magazine praised Nolot's writing and directing of the film. Nolot said that the purpose of the film is "to draw people's attention to the issue, but also to inspire them in terms of what they can be doing... to take a stand against this injustice". At the 2011 California Film Awards, Nefarious made Nolot the Grand Winner in the Best First-Time Documentary category. At the 2012 Kingdomwood Christian Film Festival, Nolot was named Best Director.

=== Liberated: The New Sexual Revolution ===
Nolot directed, wrote, and produced this 2017 Netflix documentary. The film documents college spring breakers in Panama City, Florida, commenting on the exploitation of female bodies and the porn industry's impact on millennial hookup culture. Liberated toured in the United Kingdom, the United States, and Australia. However, the film was criticized for its "painting of casual sex as inherently disempowering and the framing of sex as the most sacred act in the world", and has been described as "a Christian documentary disguising itself with no mention of its religious bias".

=== Seattle's Bikini Baristas ===
Nolot directed, wrote, and produced the short film Seattle's Bikini Baristas. The documentary, released in 2019, was presented by Magic Lantern Pictures.

== Controversy ==
In 2020, actress Melissa McCarthy and HBO withdrew their support from Exodus Cry after learning that Nolot had expressed "virulent views on social media about abortion rights and gay marriage."
