= Calev Myers =

Israeli lawyer, author and civil rights activist

Calev Michael Myers
- כלב מאיירס
- Born: United States
- Education: LLB
- Alma mater: Hebrew University of Jerusalem
- Occupation: Lawyer
- Years active: 2002-present
- Organization(s): The ARISE Foundation & Judeo Christian Zionist Congress

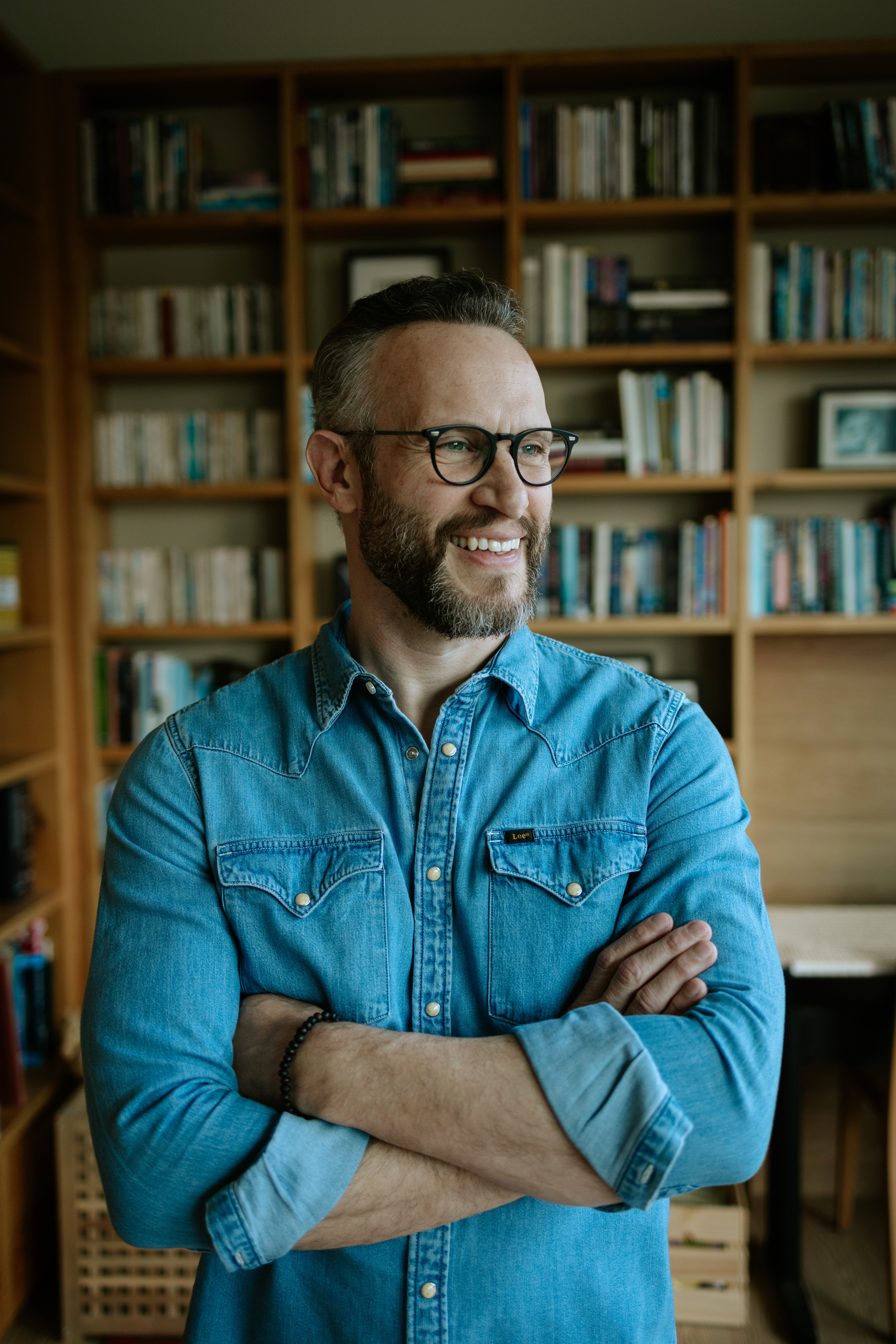

Calev Michael Myers (Hebrew: כלב מאיירס) is an Israeli lawyer, author and civil rights activist.

== Career ==
Co-Founder and Chairman of the Judeo-Christian Zionist Congress ("JCZC") - Calev Myers is an Israeli lawyer, activist, and the Co-founder and current Chairman of the JCZC, an initiative dedicated to protecting and advancing the Judeo-Christian foundations of Western civilization, and by extension the state of Israel. Myers advocates for Israel and the Jewish people, focusing on promoting Jewish-Christian solidarity based on common values, and defending Israel's right to exist as a democratic and Jewish state.

In 2026, Myers co-founded the JCZC, a platform designed to bring together Jewish and non-Jewish Zionist thought leaders to discuss and advance mutual goals. As Chairman, he has been instrumental in fostering collaboration between the two communities, aiming to build stronger ties and support Israel in both the political and cultural spheres.

Myers is the President and Executive Chairman of the Alliance to Reinforce Israel's Security and Economy (ARISE) and serves as the Chairman of the Anti-BDS Commission of the Israel Association of Bi-National Chambers of Commerce.

Myers served as Deputy President of the International Jewish Lawyers (IJL) from 2017-2020.

In 2009, Myers became a founding partner of the Jerusalem city center brand of Yehuda Raveh and Co, which primarily serves foreign clients, investing or donating in Israel and grants them services in various areas. He specializes in Corporate Law, Intellectual Property and Charity Law as well as non-profit law, immigration law, and civil rights.

In 2004, Myers became a partner at Yehuda Raveh, a law firm, established in 1940 by Gideon Hausner, Attorney-General of Israel and Member of the Knesset in 1965, 1969, 1974 and 1977.

In 2004, Myers founded the Jerusalem Institute of Justice (JIJ), a human rights group active in Israel and its adjacent territories He was active in advocating for the rights of Palestinians before international governmental bodies, including the European Parliament and the Swiss Parliament against the Palestinian Authority and Hamas, as the primary abusers of Palestinian Human Rights.

Myers has been published in the International Law Review.

In 2016, Myers published Crucial Alliance - African Americans, Jews and the Middle East Conundrum.

In addition, Myers has contributed op-eds to the Times of Israel website and the Walla News website.

== Personal life ==
Calev Myers is married to Sheli Myers, a licensed parenthood counselor and music producer in Israel. Together, they have raised five children. Sheli is dedicated to supporting parents through counseling, group sessions, and lectures, upholding the family unit as the cornerstone of healthy society. A woman of deep faith, Sheli also expresses her spirituality through music, drawing inspiration from ancient Hebrew scriptures to provide meaning and strength.
