= Kajsa Wahlberg =

Swedish police officer

Detective Inspector Kajsa Wahlberg
- Police career
- Allegiance: Sweden
- Department: Swedish Police Authority
- Status: Director of Sweden's human trafficking unit
- Rank: Detective Inspector
- Other work: National rapporteur on human trafficking

Kajsa Wahlberg is Sweden's national rapporteur on human trafficking opposition activities. She holds the title of Detective Inspector, and serves on the Swedish Police Authority's human trafficking unit, of which she is the head.

== Career ==
Wahlberg serves as Detective Inspector and head of the Swedish Police Authority's human trafficking unit. She is also Sweden's national rapporteur on human trafficking opposition activities.

== Views on Sweden's prostitution law ==
Wahlberg estimated that the number of prostitutes in the country dropped 40% between 1998 and 2003 because of Sweden's passing of the 1999 Kvinnofrid law that made selling sex legal, but buying sex illegal. In 2005, she said that the effectiveness of the Kvinnofrid law is limited by the fact that not all of the country's police authorities make enforcing this particular law a priority, with many police authorities allocating more of their resources to combat the illegal drug trade.

In 2008, she stated, "We don't have a problem with prostitutes. We have a problem with men who buy sex." In 2009, she said that most of Sweden's prostitutes immigrated to Sweden from Eastern Europe.

== International influence ==
In 2008, Wahlberg said that large numbers of foreign politicians and law enforcement officials were coming to Sweden looking to study the Kvinnofrid law. In March of that year, Wahlberg served on a Swedish delegation of experts who travelled to Scotland as the start of a campaign to implement a law in Scotland analogous to the Kvinnofrid law in Sweden.
