= 2007 international child pornography investigation =

2007 multinational child pornography investigation

- Type: Child pornography crackdown
- Scope: Multinational

Participants
- Initiated by: Austria
- Countries participating: United States, Germany, Ireland, Australia, Austria
- No. of countries participating: 77

Mission
- Target: Russian website hosted on Austrian server

Results
- Suspects: 2,360+: Australia = 130, United States = 600, Austria = 23; Ireland = 2

The 2007 international child pornography investigation was an international criminal investigation into a criminal organization dealing in child pornography. Austrian authorities initiated the investigation in July and were the ones to uncover the criminal organization. More than 2,360 suspects residing in 77 countries were investigated. Approximately 600 of the suspects were in the United States. The European country with the most suspects was Germany. 130 of the suspects were in Australia. The two suspects in the Republic of Ireland were not investigated by Garda Síochána until six months after Austrian authorities notified them of the crime. At least 23 suspects were Austrians. The pornography depicted the sexual abuse of children under the age of 14. A Russian website hosted the pornography on an Austrian server.

== See also ==
- 2013 International child pornography investigation
