= Arno Behrisch =

German politician (1913–1989)

Member of the Bundestag; from Bavaria
- In office 7 September 1949 – 17 October 1961
- Preceded by: Constituency established
- Succeeded by: Multi-member district
- Constituency: Hof (1949–1953); State list (1953–1961)

Member of the Landtag of Bavaria
- In office 16 December 1946 – 22 September 1949
- Preceded by: Multi-member district
- Succeeded by: Arthur Tübel
- Constituency: Upper Franconia

Personal details
- Born: 6 June 1913 Dresden, Germany
- Died: 16 September 1989 (aged 76) Hof, Bavaria, West Germany
- Party: German Peace Union (1961–1968)
- Other political affiliations: SAP (1931–1933); SDP (1944–1961)

Arno Erich Behrisch (6 June 1913 – 16 September 1989) was a German politician of the Social Democratic Party (SPD) and former member of the German Bundestag.

== Political career ==
From 1946 to 1949, Behrisch was a member of the Bavarian State Parliament, then of the West German Bundestag until 1961.

== Literature ==
Herbst, Ludolf; Jahn, Bruno (2002). Vierhaus, Rudolf (ed.). Biographisches Handbuch der Mitglieder des Deutschen Bundestages. 1949–2002 [Biographical Handbook of the Members of the German Bundestag. 1949–2002] (in German). München: De Gruyter - De Gruyter Saur. p. 1715. ISBN 978-3-11-184511-1.
