= Lauran Bethell =

American activist

Ecclesiastical career
- Church: American Baptist Churches USA
- Title: The Reverend Doctor

Lauran Bethell is an American Baptist missionary and human rights advocate residing in Eastern Europe. She is one of the founders of Chiang Mai, Thailand's New Life Center, in which former prostitutes or sex trafficking victims are provided with a Christian-based education aimed at making them literate and employable. She holds the position of Global Consultant with the American Baptist International Ministries. She is currently based in the Netherlands.

== Biography ==
Bethell was the only daughter and oldest sibling growing up in San Joaquin Valley. Her father was a Baptist minister.

Bethell attended the University of Redlands. Soon after, she followed her childhood dream of visiting far-away countries and started teaching in Hong Kong in 1978 and a year later, visited Thailand. Inspired by seeing the prostitution district in Thailand, she founded and became the director of New Life Center in Chiang Mai in 1987. By 1995, the New Life Center, under her direction, was aiding approximately 120 women every day, teaching them vocational skills and enabling them to attend night school for literacy. She also worked with local police and families to remove women and children from brothels in Thailand.

In 2001, she began working as an international consultant on human trafficking and human exploitation for the American Baptist Ministries. In 2000, she testified for the United States Committee on Foreign Relations about sex trafficking. In 2003, she again testified about human trafficking at the United States House of Representatives. The next year, in July 2004, Bethell spoke at the pre-conference to the Baptist World Centenary Congress. In 2005, she received the Baptist World Alliance Human Rights Award.

In November 2006, Bethell spoke at an evening gathering in Orlando, Florida in celebration of the 100th anniversary of the founding of the American Baptist Churches USA. In March 2009, Bethell spoke at a conference called "STOP Sex Trafficking: A Call to End 21st Century Slavery" at Mercer University.

Bethell's philosophy is that prostituted children can recover from their abuse and said that those who suggest otherwise are "not giving enough credit to the power of the human spirit." Bethell also supports the "Nordic Model" of fighting prostitution.
