= Exodus Cry =

American Christian advocacy organization

- Legal status: 501(c)(3) organization

Exodus Cry is an American Christian non-profit advocacy organization seeking the abolition of the legal commercial sex industry, including pornography, strip clubs, and sex work, as well as illegal sex trafficking. It has been described by the New York Daily News, TheWrap, and others as anti-LGBT, with ties to the anti-abortion movement.

== History ==
The organization originally developed out of a weekly prayer group founded in 2007 by Benjamin Nolot, a filmmaker and member of the Charismatic Christian International House of Prayer. Nolot is currently the CEO of the organization. Exodus Cry says it is no longer directly affiliated with the church, but that it is faith-based and does offer prayer instruction on its website. As of 2018, Exodus Cry was listed as a "related tax-exempt organization" on tax filings submitted by the International House of Prayer and has partnered with the church for campaigns since then.

=== Traffickinghub campaign ===
The campaign states: "We're calling for Pornhub to be shut down and its executives held accountable for these crimes." Writing for Vice, Samantha Cole says that there are similarities between Exodus Cry campaign's messaging and that of some far-right (neo-Nazis and white supremacists) and extremist Christian groups; however, Cole writes that they have "never explicitly called for violence against Pornhub, and both groups clearly condemned these posts and others that call for violence while invoking their names after Motherboard reached out for comment."

==== Legal proceedings ====
In December 2020, Pornhub's parent company MindGeek was sued in California on allegations of hosting non-consensual videos produced by GirlsDoPorn, which allegedly coerced women into appearing in their videos under false pretenses. In January 2021, a class action lawsuit making similar allegations was launched in Montreal, seeking $600 million in damages for anyone whose intimate photos and videos had been shared on MindGeek's sites without their consent. In June 2021, another class-action lawsuit by 34 additional women was filed against Mindgeek in federal court, alleging that the company had exploited them and hosted and promoted videos that depicted rape, revenge porn, and child sexual abuse.

=== Ban of sexually explicit content on OnlyFans ===
Pressure from the group, alongside purported MasterCard policy changes, was alleged to be behind the initial decision of OnlyFans to ban sexually explicit content in late 2021 (although this decision was subsequently reversed after a major backlash).

=== Criticism ===
In 2017, Exodus Cry released Liberated: The New Sexual Revolution, a documentary filmed during Spring Break condemning hook-up culture and casual sex. The film was shown on Netflix and at various college campuses. The film and the organization were criticized by people for failing to disclose the group's religious background, as well as for director Nolot's historic opposition to abortion and gay rights.

In November 2020, actress Melissa McCarthy and HBO pulled their planned charitable support of the organization, after learning that founder and CEO Nolot had once compared abortion to the Holocaust, and had also condemned gay marriage. The next month, the International Slavery Museum cancelled a planned collaboration with the organization because of Nolot's views on gay marriage. In both cases, Exodus Cry denied accusations of homophobia, and stated that Nolot's personal views were not relevant to the overall mission of the organization.
