= Jerusalem Institute of Justice =

Israeli human rights nonprofit organization

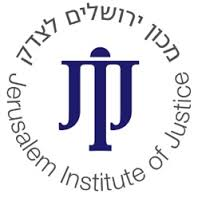
- Major practice areas: Cases of religious discrimination in Israel
- Date founded: 2004
- Website: jij.org.il

The Jerusalem Institute of Justice (JIJ) (Hebrew: מכון ירושלים לצדק) is a non-profit human rights organization operating in Israel. JIJ pursues justice on behalf of survivors of terrorism, human trafficking, and discrimination; and upholds the legitimate standing of Israel within the community of nations.

== History ==
JIJ was founded in 2004 by Calev Myers, an Israeli civil rights lawyer. Early in its history, JIJ focused on advocating for religious minorities. More recently, JIJ has drawn attention for its advocacy on behalf of the victims of the October 7 attacks.

== Areas of operation ==
=== International advocacy ===
JIJ leverage their Special Consultative Status at the United Nations (both in Geneva and New York) to defend the legitimate standing of Israel within the community of nations and stand against the normalization of antisemitic hatred and atrocity denial. Through research, legal advocacy, and reporting, JIJ documents human rights violations, represents survivors, and pursues accountability through legal channels.

JIJ has historically sought to advocate on behalf of both Israelis and Palestinians in regard to civil rights.

=== Legal assistance ===
JIJ provides free legal aid to survivors of terrorism, human trafficking, and discrimination. The JIJ legal team has handled over 2,500 cases and secured 25 precedent-setting victories in Israel’s Supreme Court. Since October 7, they have expanded their docket to cover survivors of war and people with disabilities.

The JIJ also offers comprehensive legal support in Israel for immigration and civil status matters, including help with visa applications, aliyah, humanitarian cases, asylum seeker assistance, and status regularization for foreign spouses. In addition, JIJ offers assistance to Haredi soldiers in the military and lone soldiers in the IDF.

=== Combating human trafficking ===
The JIJ is a leader in the fight to suppress demand for prostitution & human trafficking in Israel. JIJ has persuaded the Israeli Parliament to adopt an innovative legal model that treats women and children involved in prostitution as victims of exploitation and abuse, and criminalizes the activities of purchasers and pimps. As this new legal framework goes into effect, JIJ continues to provide free legal aid to survivors of sex trafficking & labor trafficking.

=== Education ===
The Jerusalem Institute of Justice equips students and community leaders through webinars, internships, and fellowship programs. Since its founding, JIJ has hosted over 400 interns & fellows from more than 20 countries in their Jerusalem office.
