= Bergkopf =

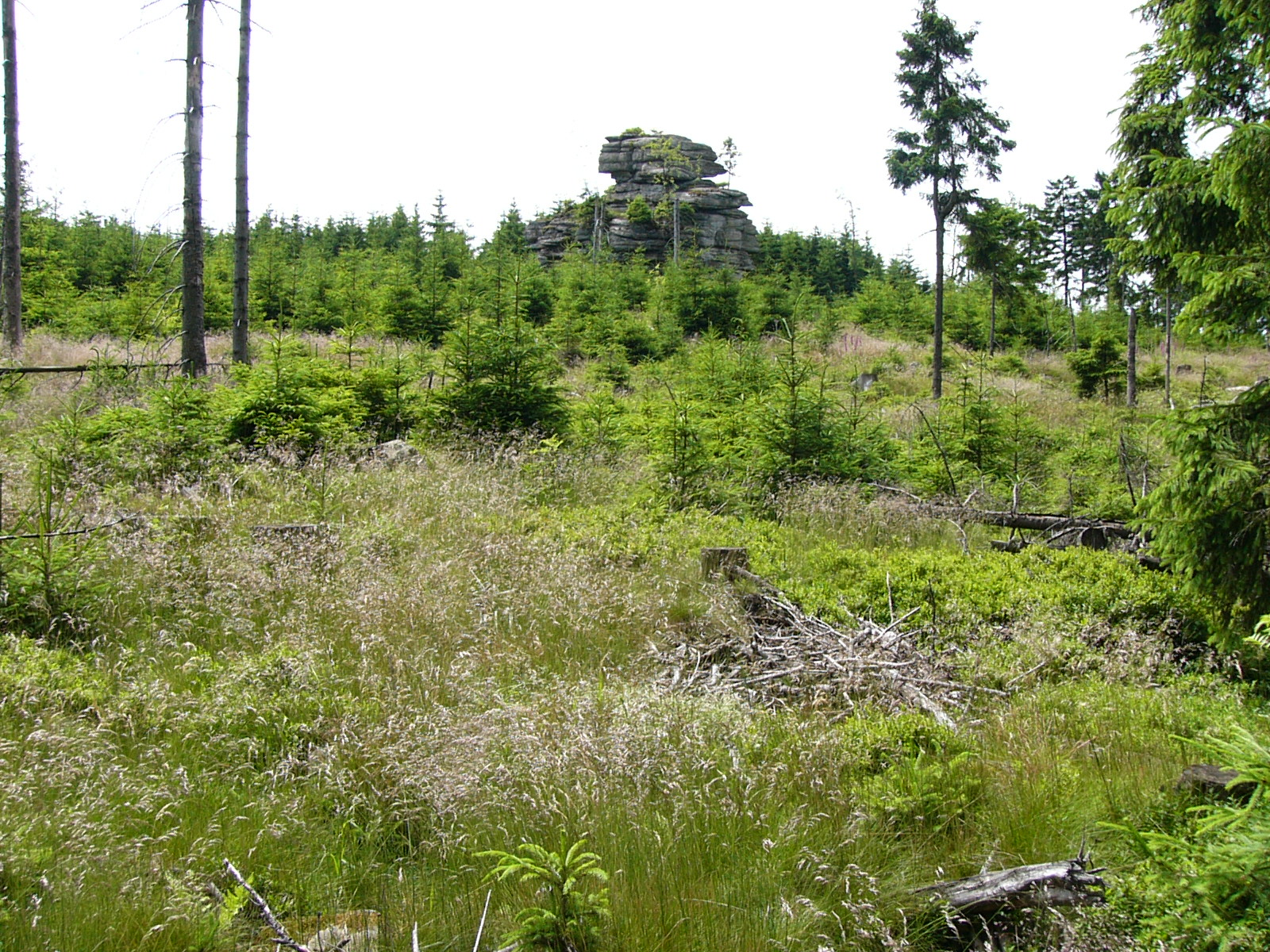
- The Kleiner Waldstein rocks on the northern slope of the mountain

Highest point
- Elevation: 857 m above sea level (NN) (2,812 ft)
- Coordinates: 50°08′45″N 11°52′43″E

Geography
- Location within Bavaria
- Parent range: Fichtel Mountains

The Bergkopf is an 857 metre high, thickly forested mountain in the Sparneck Forest in Germany's Fichtel Mountains.

It lies in the northern chain of the Fichtel Mountain Horseshoe, near the crest of the Großer Waldstein. On its northern slopes is the granite rock formation of Kleiner Waldstein (829 m above NN), and, further north towards Sparneck, the source of the Förmitz river. To the northeast lies the granite mountain of Hoher Stein (817 m above NN) and, on its slopes, is the source of the Lamitz. To the southwest towards Weißenstadt, a monument commemorates the forester, Johann Braun, who died at that spot on 12 July 1881.

== Literature ==
- Dietmar Herrmann: Lexikon Fichtelgebirge - Bayerisches Vorgtland, Steinwald, Bayreuther Land. Ackermann Verlag. Hof, 2000. ISBN 3-929364-18-2. p.61.
