= Hoher Stein (Fichtel Mountains) =

Coordinates: 50.1507°N 11.8918°E

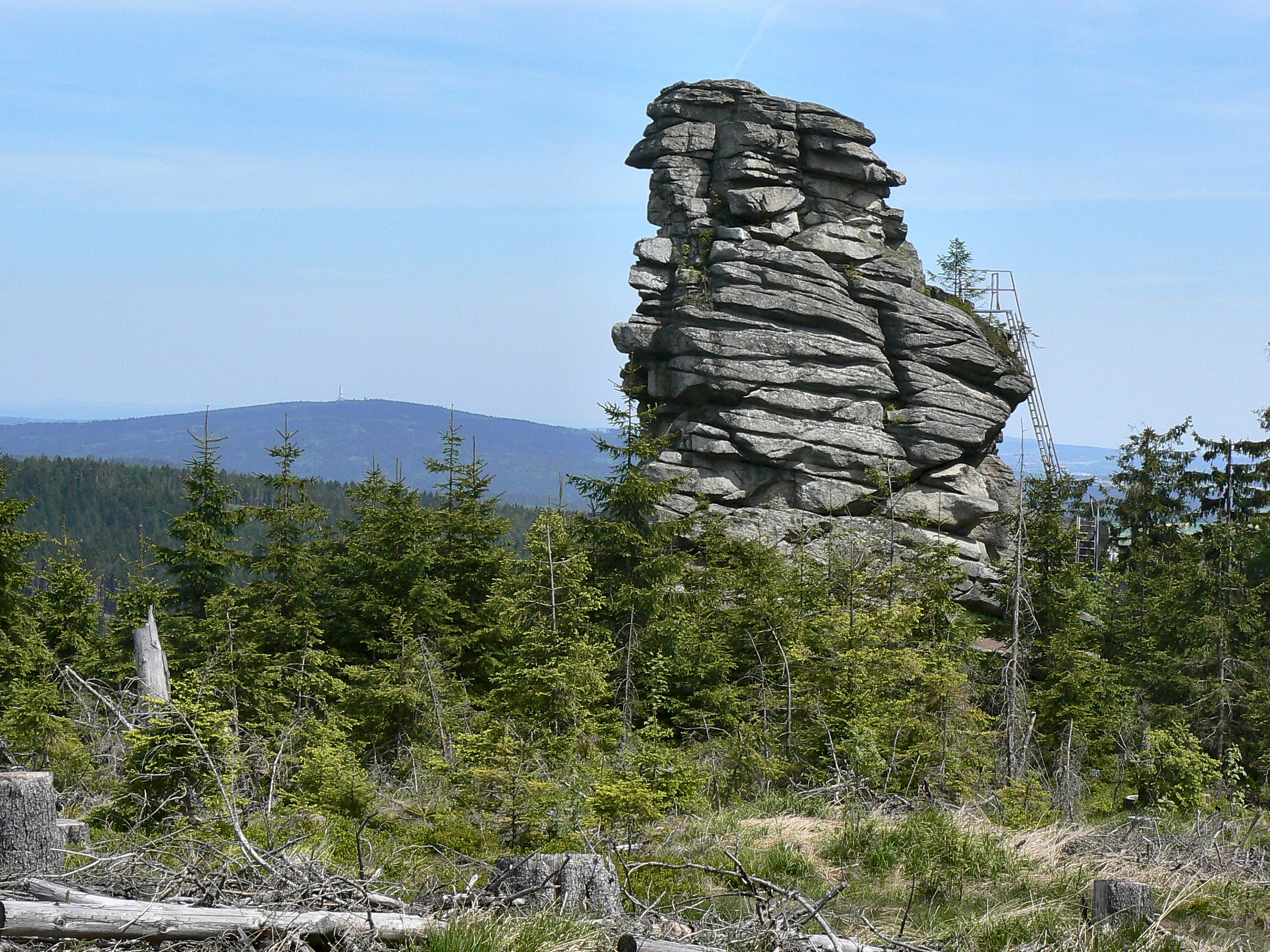
The Hoher Stein rock formation at the northeastern foot of the Bergkopf

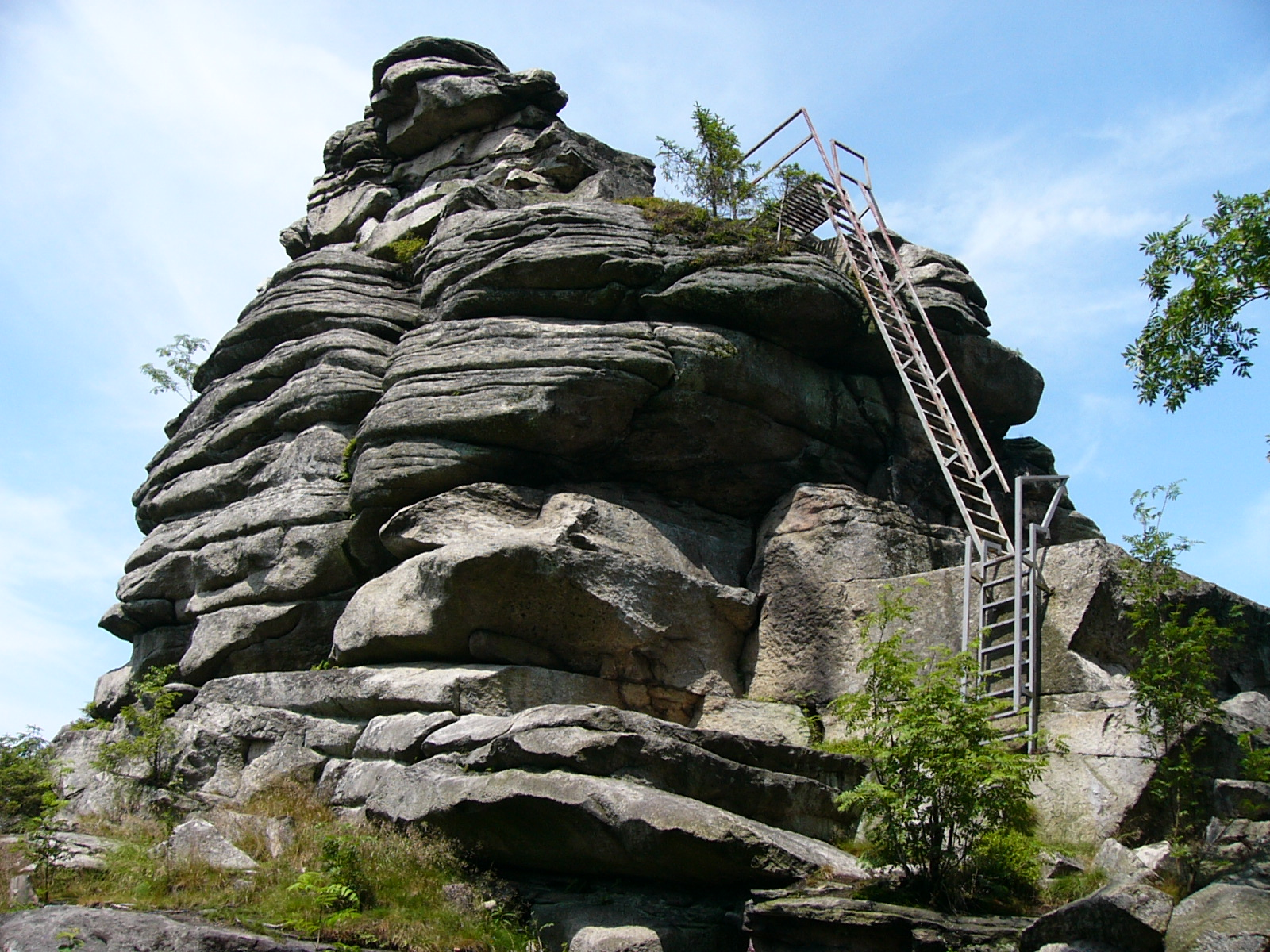
Close up view of the rocks and the ascent

The Hoher Stein is a rock formation at the northeastern foot of the Bergkopf mountain, part of the Waldstein ridge in Germany's Fichtel Mountains.

== Appearance and location ==
The Hoher Stein rocks are about 25 metres high, their highest point having an elevation of 817 m above NHN. They are granite rocks exhibiting spheroidal weathering. Iron ladders climb the rocks to a viewing point. The rocks are officially designated as climbing rocks.

The Hoher Stein lies west of the town of Kirchenlamitz and northeast of the Großer Waldstein mountain in the forest district of Hallersteiner Forst Süd. Although the Hoher Stein is not far from another rock formation, the Kleiner Waldstein, they are only linked by circuitous routes. Sights in the vicinity are the source of the Lamitz and the Epprechtstein.

== History as a boundary stone ==
Today the rocks lie on the border between the Upper Franconian counties of Wunsiedel im Fichtelgebirge and Hof. In former times the political boundary between the districts of Sechsämterland and Landsmannschaft Hof ran here, something that goes back to the Landbuch der Sechsämter document of 1499 (see also Brandenburg-Kulmbach). The ecclesiastical boundary between the bishoprics of Bamberg and Regensburg also ran along the crest of the ridge.

The Hohenzollern coat of arms (32 cm wide, 38 cm high) and two crosses (20 cm x 20 cm) have been carved into the rocks on their western side. On their eastern side there is another cross and an upward pointing arrow.
