= Großer Waldstein =

Mountain in Germany

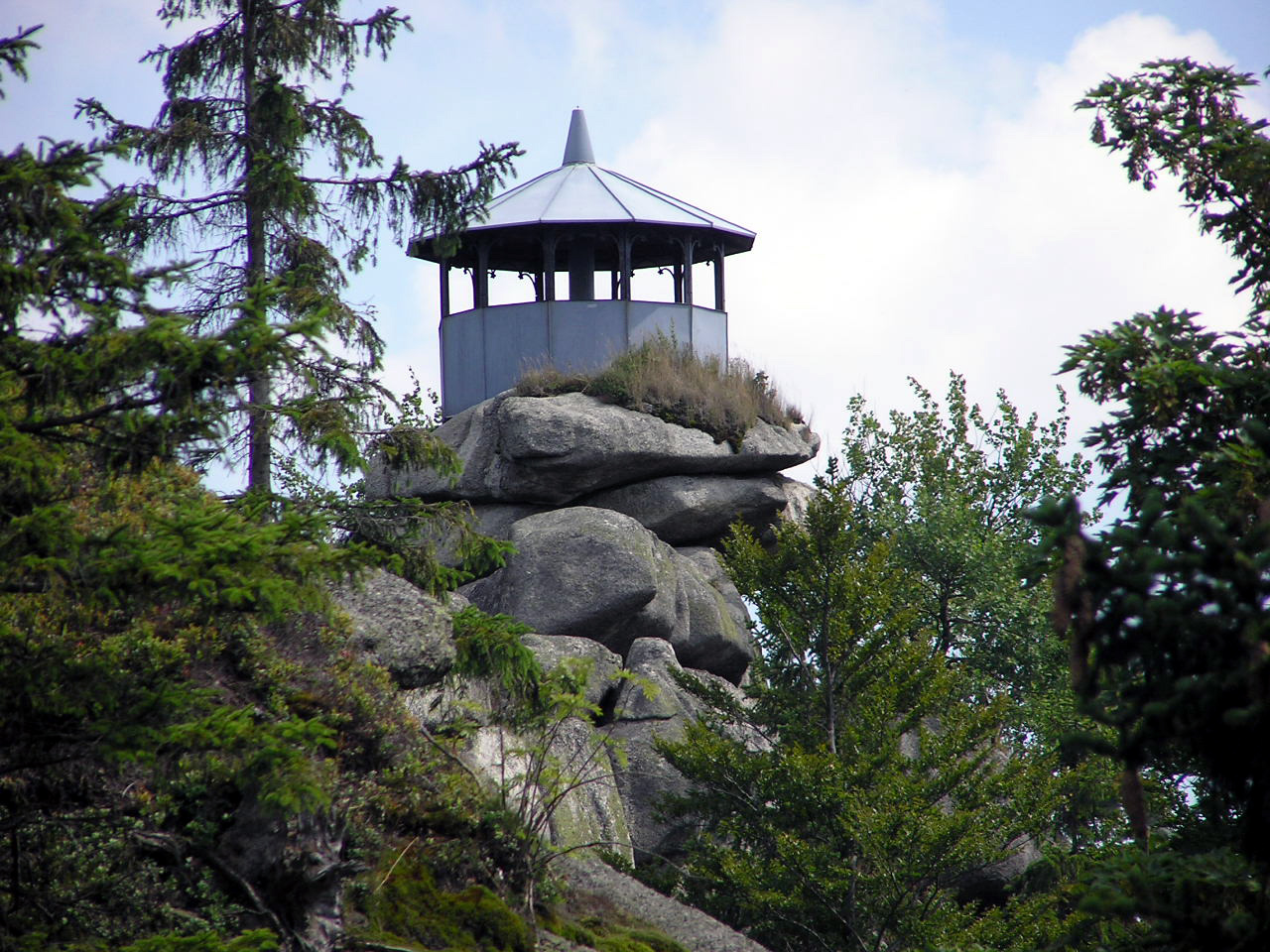
- The Schüssel observation pavilion

Highest point
- Elevation: 877 m above sea level (NN) (2,877 ft)
- Coordinates: 50°07′44″N 11°51′18″E

Geography
- Location within Bavaria
- Location: Bavaria, Germany
- Parent range: Fichtel Mountains

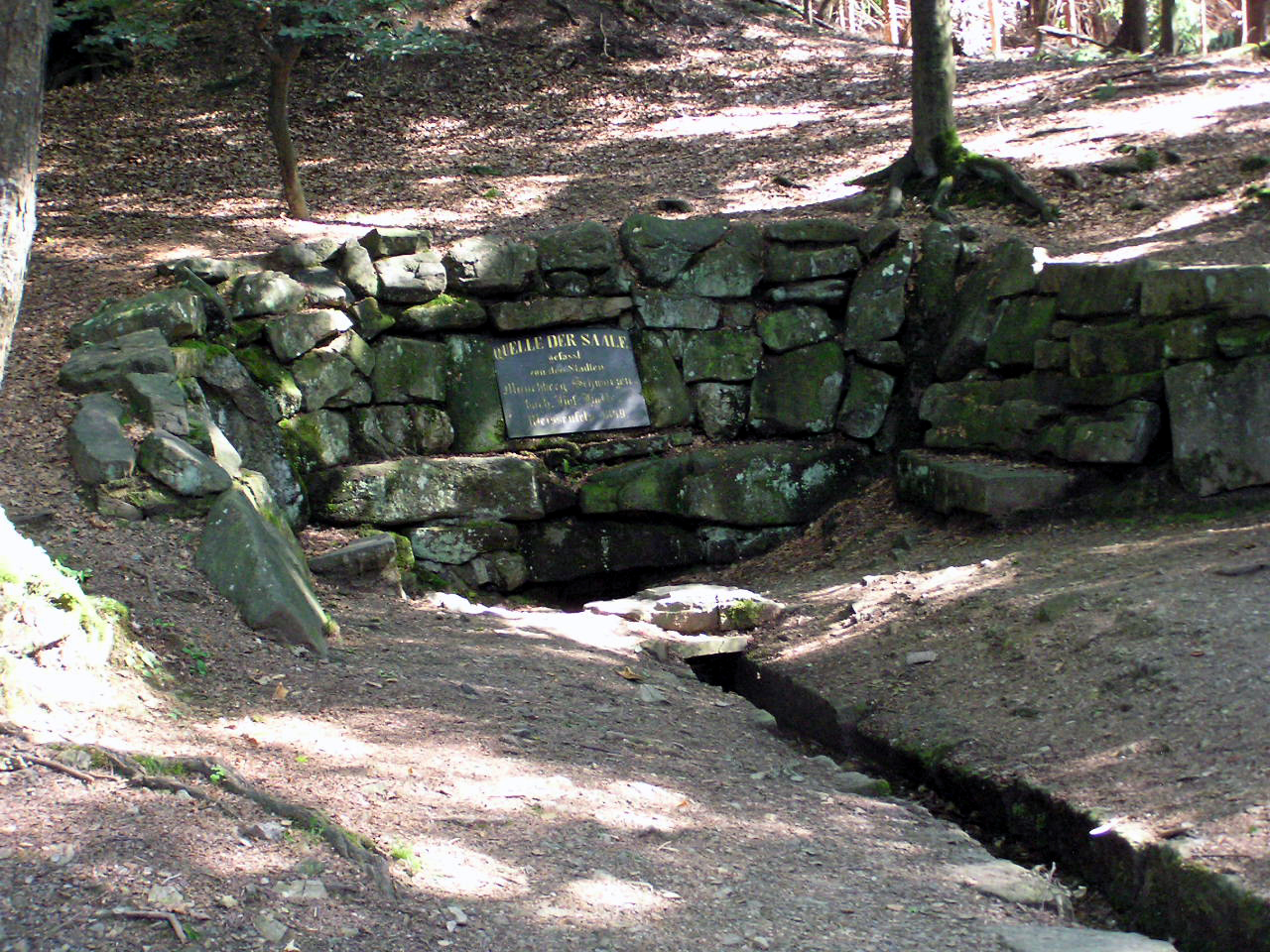
Source of the River Saale

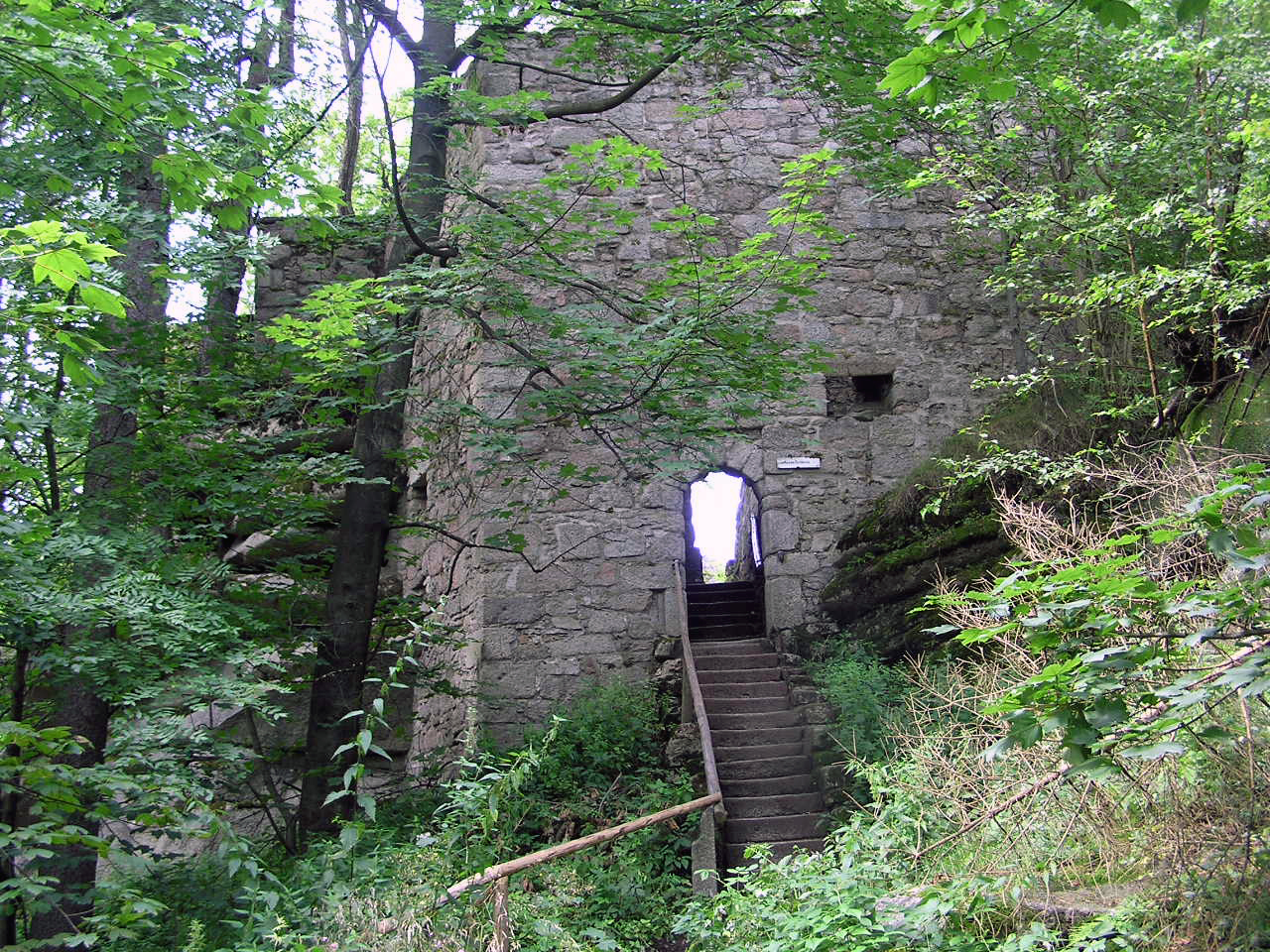
Ruins of the Red Castle

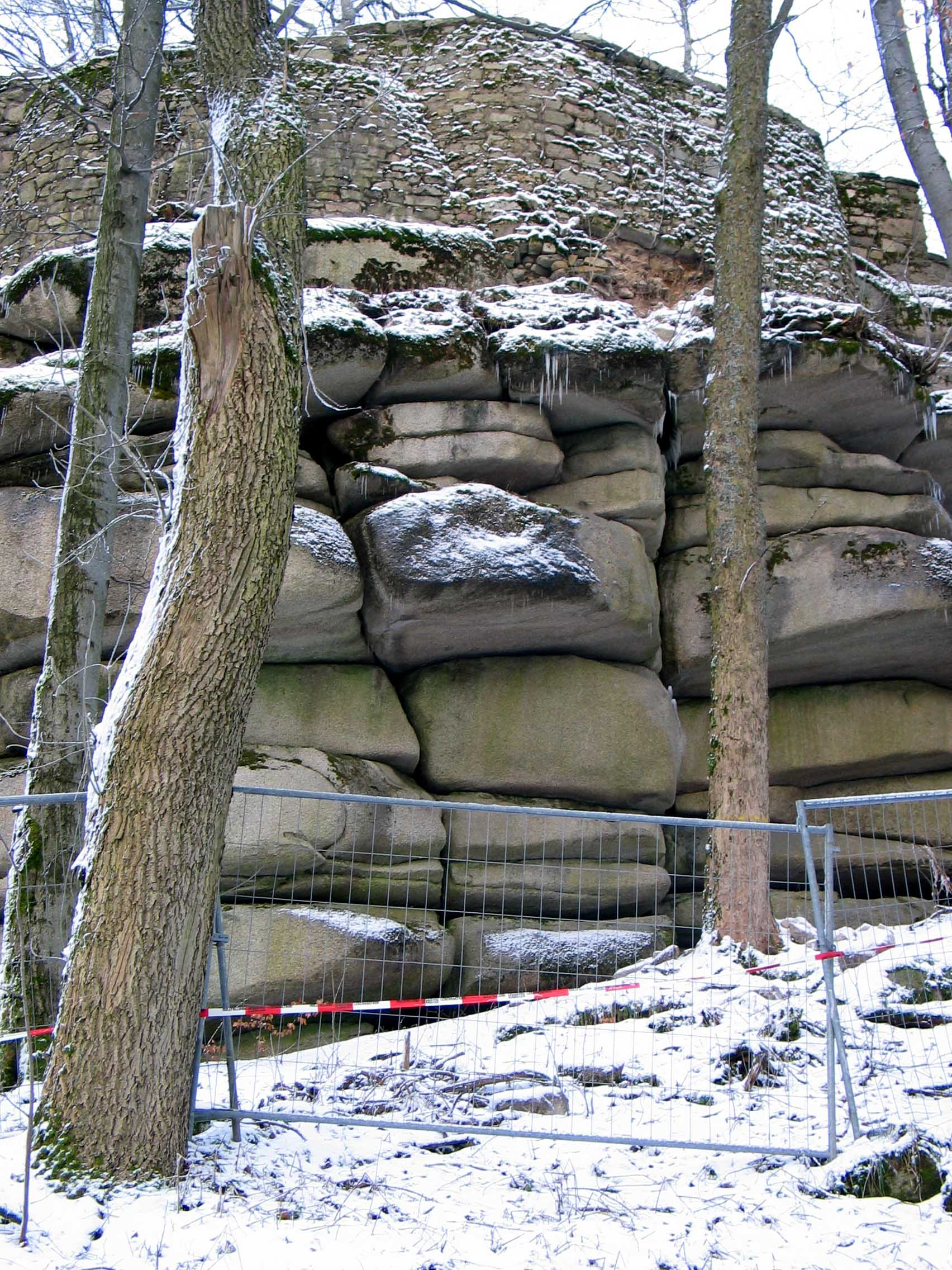
Damage at the Red Castle

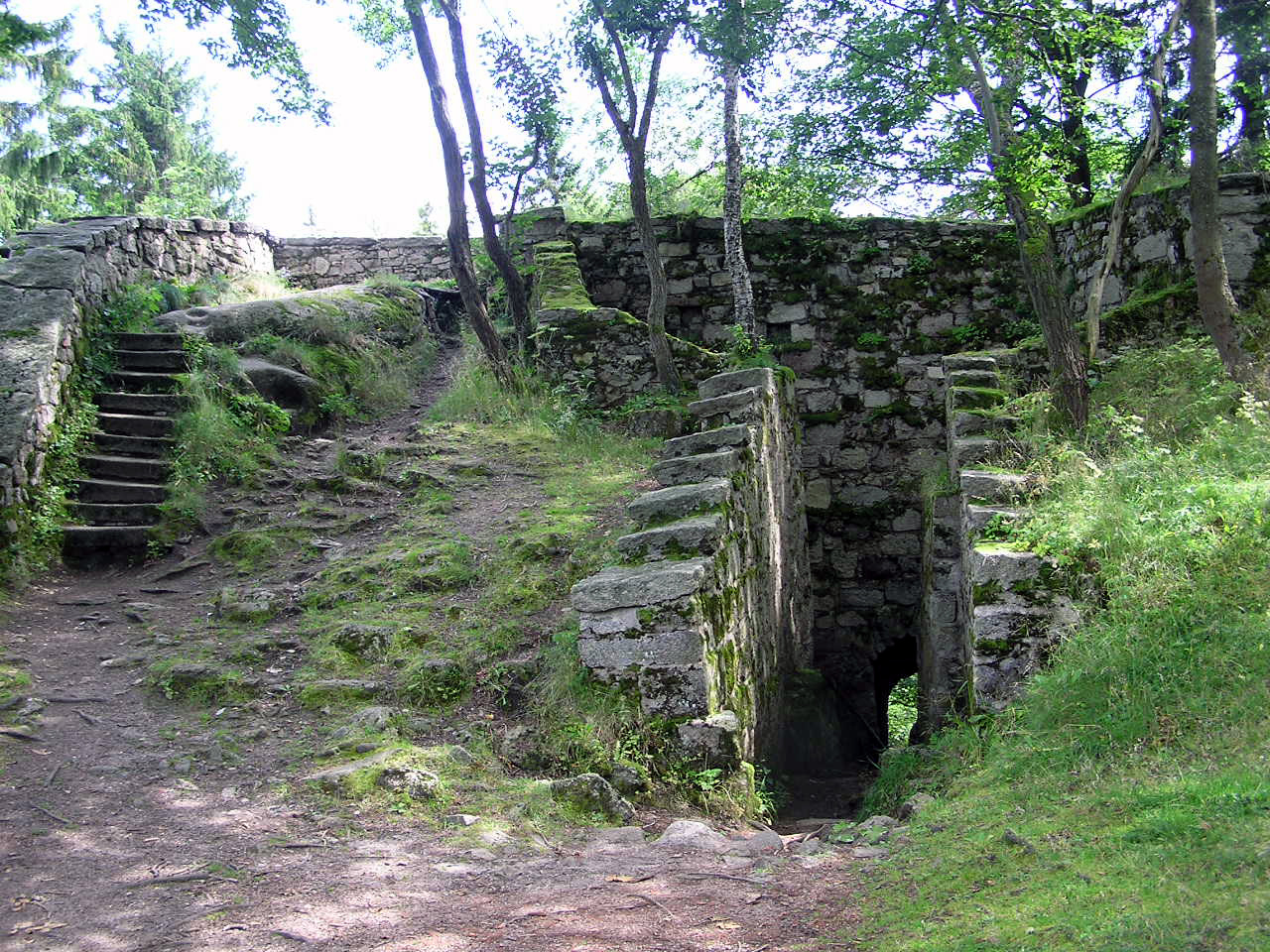
Interior of the Red Castle

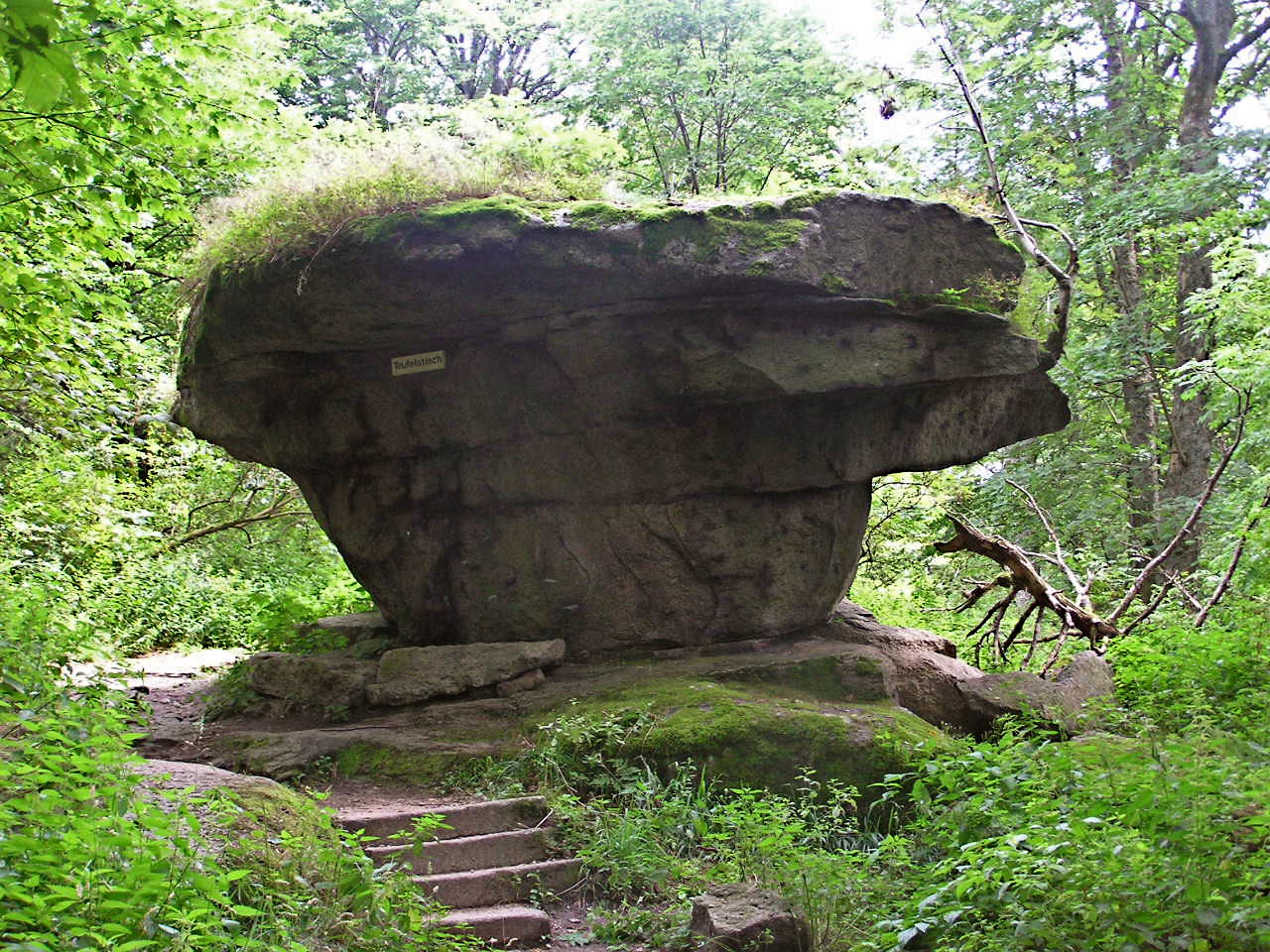
The Devil's Table

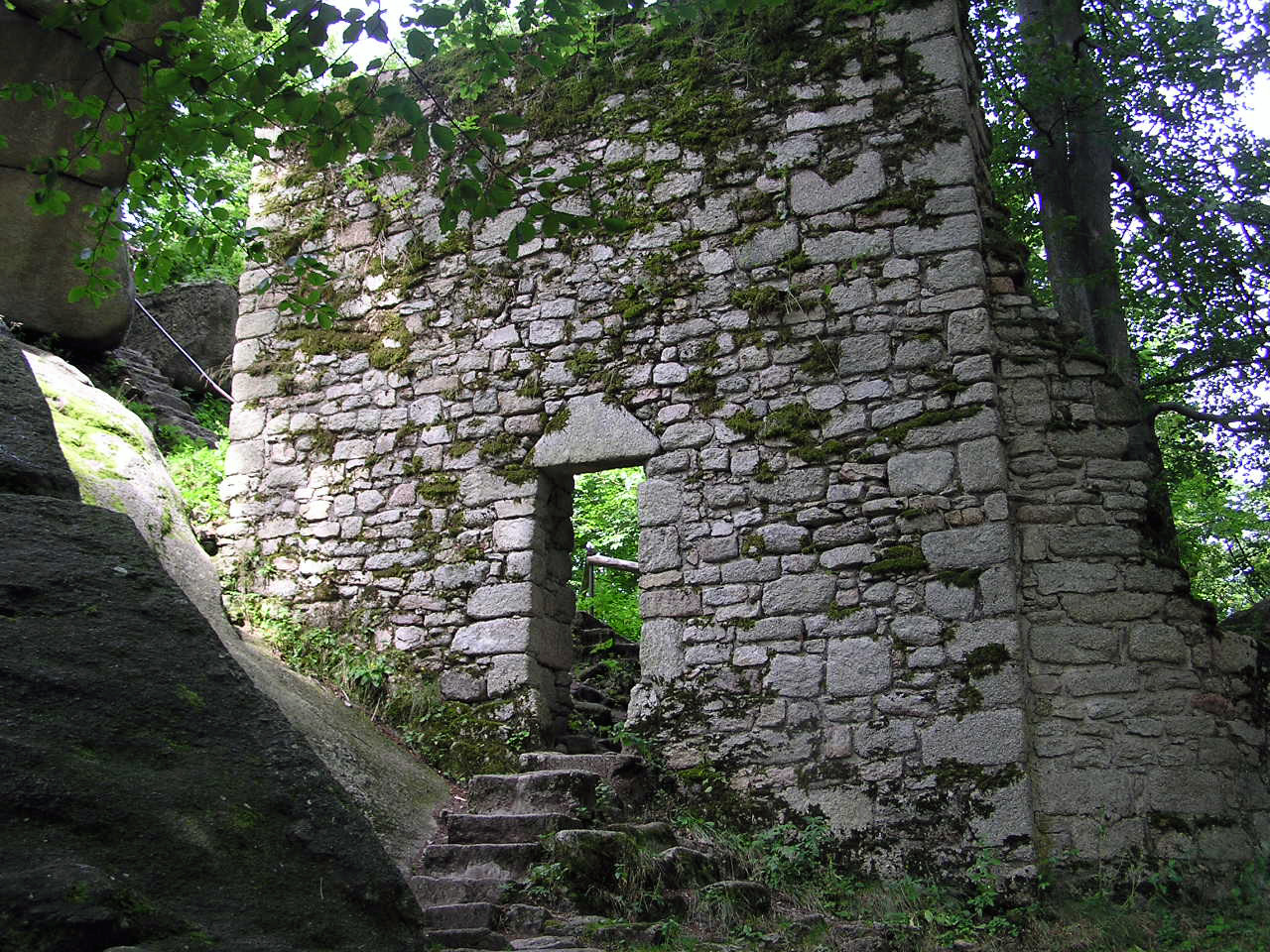
The ruined chapel

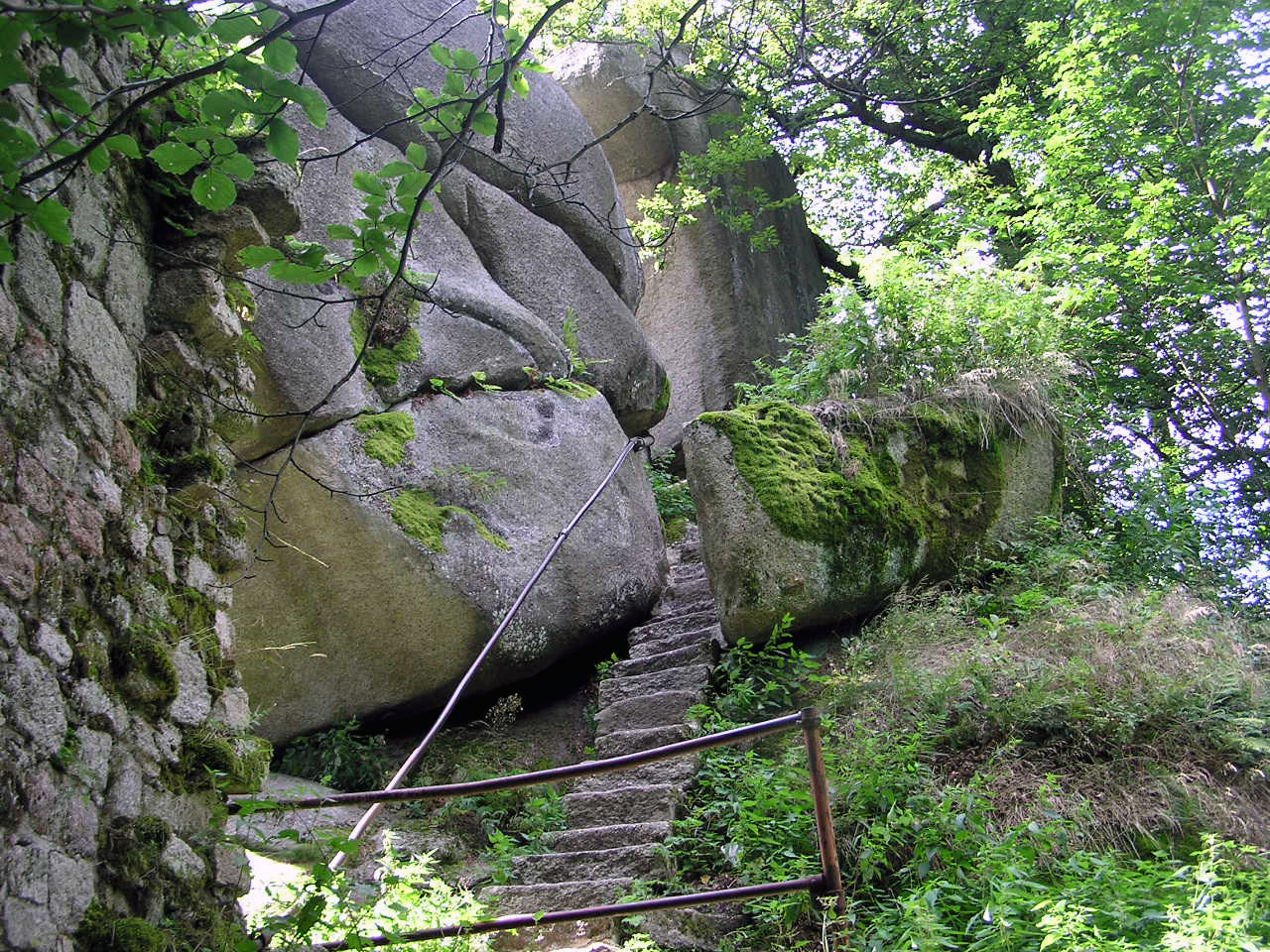
Steps to the Schüssel

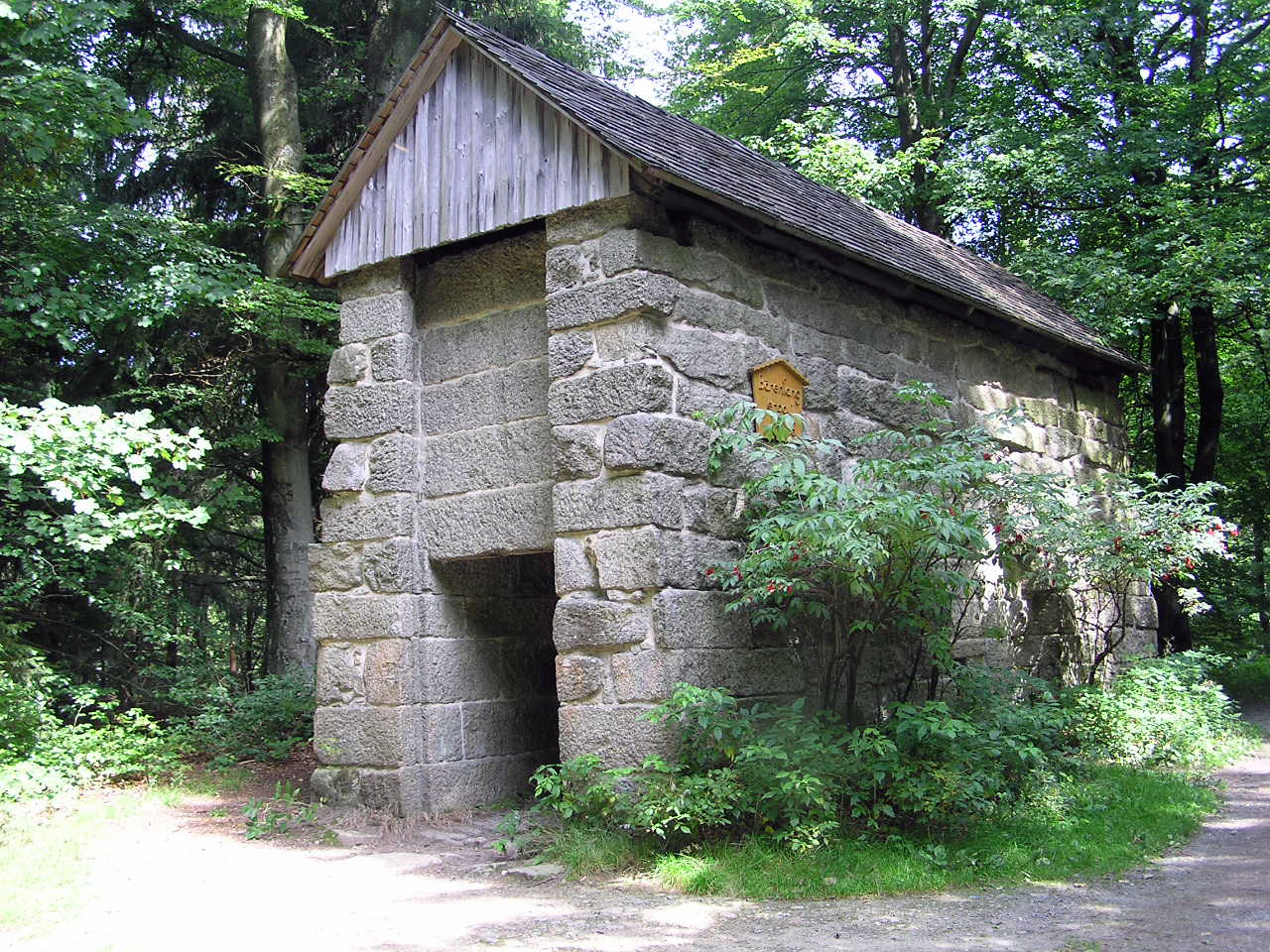
Bear trap

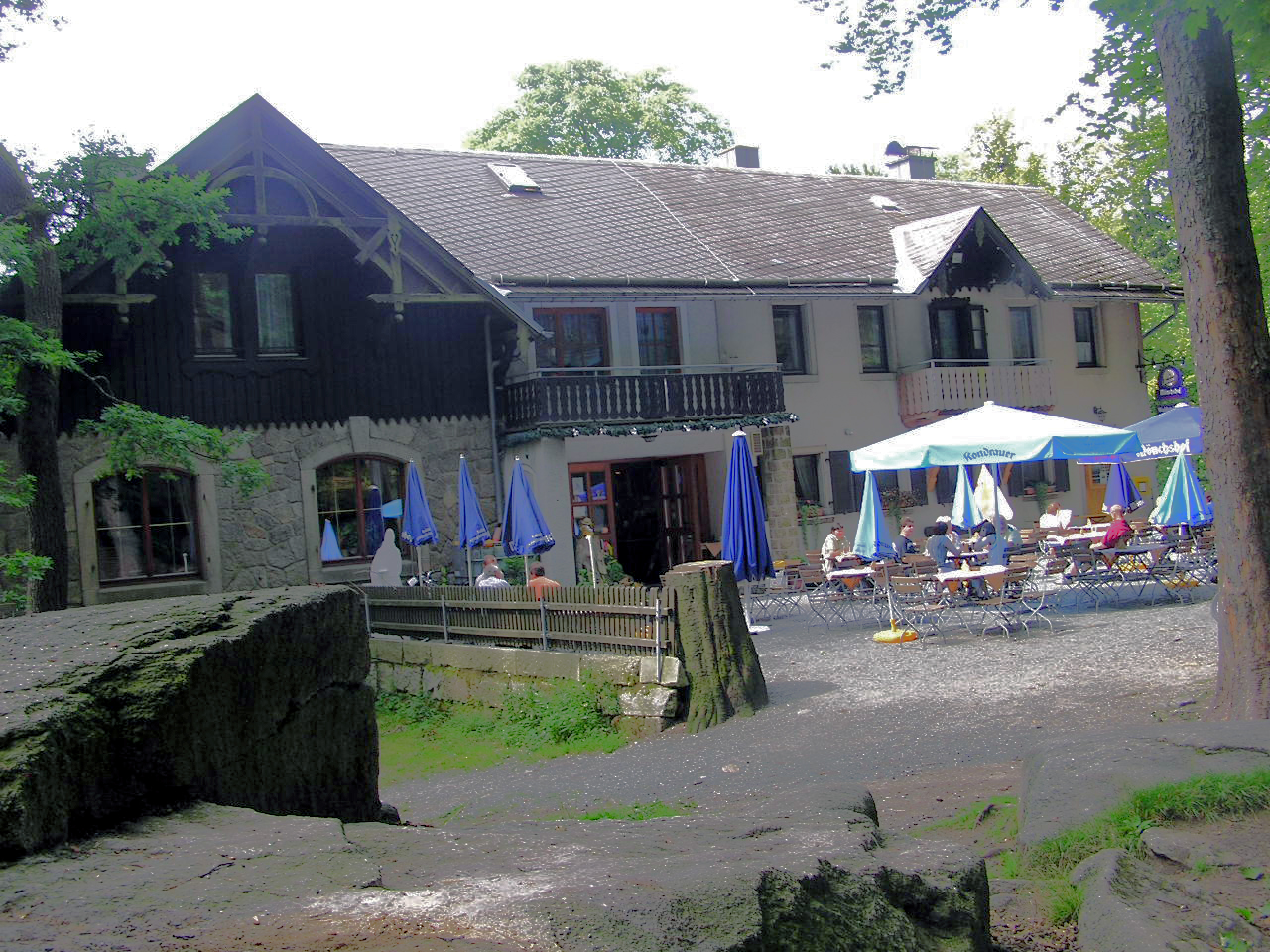
The Waldsteinhaus

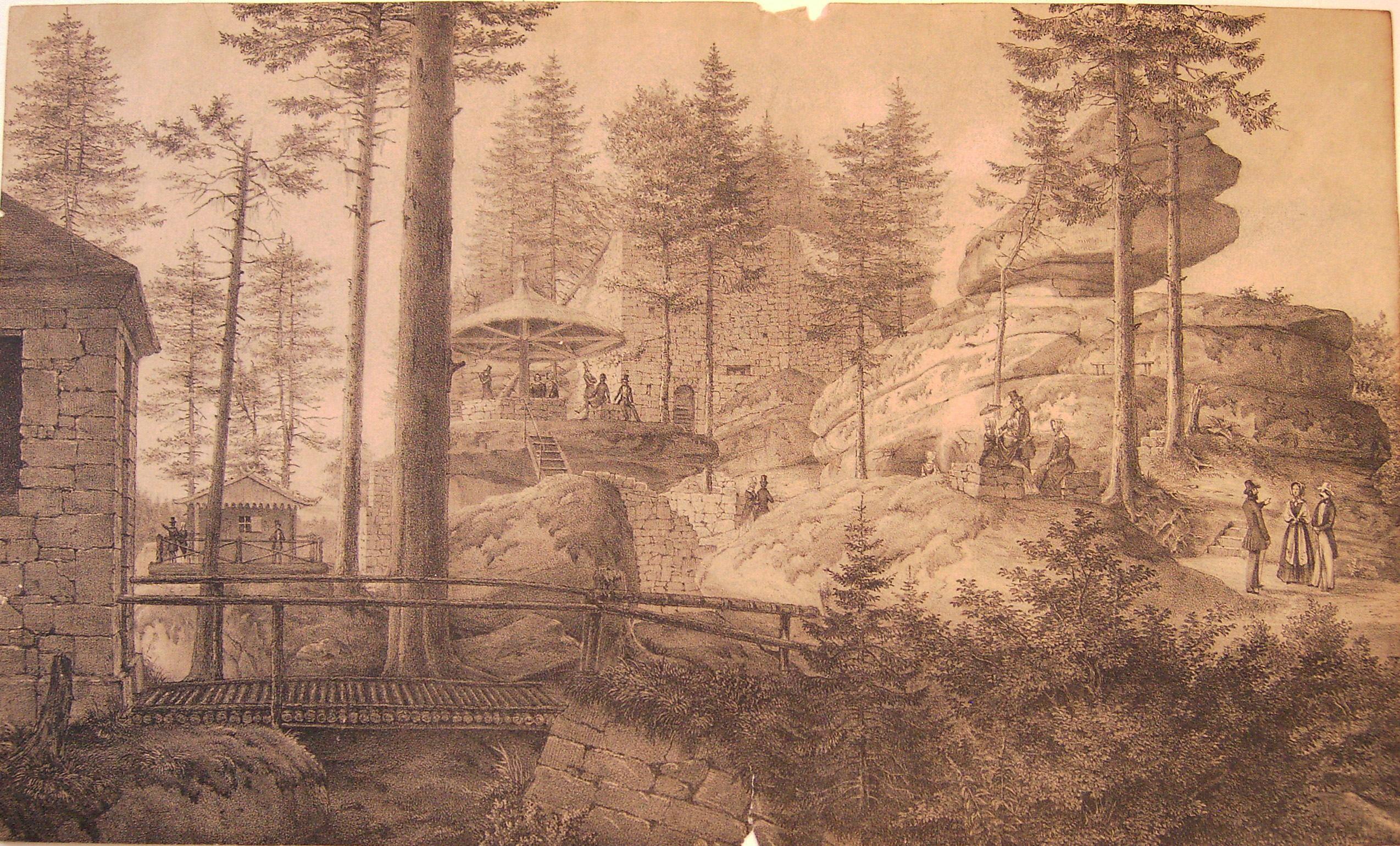
Lithograph by Gerd Könitzer showing the pavilion on the Devil's Table (ca. 1800).

The Großer Waldstein is part of the Waldstein range in the Fichtel Mountains of Germany. It is known primarily for its rock formations caused by spheroidal weathering, its ruined castles and the only remaining bear trap (Bärenfang) in the region.

== Location and description ==
The Großer Waldstein (877 m above sea level (NN)) is a mountain in the northern part of the Fichtel Mountain Horseshoe. Its summit area is covered by mixed forest with old stands of beech and huge rock piles, and the whole area is a designated nature reserve (20.2 hectares (50 acres)). Marked hiking trails lead from all points of the compass to the mountain, and public roads run from Weißenstadt or Sparneck to the area of the summit. At the top is a lodging house owned by the Fichtelgebirge Club, the Waldsteinhaus, from which there is an interesting walk around the summit area.

The Jean Paul Way also crosses the Großer Waldstein. The Kleiner Waldstein and Hoher Stein are other rock formations on the Bergkopf. At the Großer Waldstein the Zellerfels are a rock formation. The source of the River Saale rises at the foot of the Großer Waldstein near Zell im Fichtelgebirge.

== Ruins of the Red Castle ==
To the east, opposite the Waldsteinhaus, rises a massive rock face, on which the remains of the once mighty fortress of Waldstein is perched. The castle is now often referred to as the Red Castle (Rotes Schloss) and for a long time it was assumed that this was because the palace had been covered with red tiles when it was built in the 14th century. This assumption is wrong, however. The name 'Red Castle' came from the fact that parts of the castle ruins were re-roofed during the Spanish War of Succession (1701–1714) in order to build a camp there. It was this new roof that was covered with red tiles, which can still be found around the castle. The term 'Red Castle' was coined by the headmaster of Hof Grammar School (Hofer Gymnasium), Helfrecht, who referred to it as such in his first work published in 1795, because he believed that the castle had always been covered with red tiles. Since almost all later researchers followed suit, the idea became accepted. Only Karl Dietel refuted this incorrect assumption in his work Der Große Waldstein im Fichtelgebirge.

Stone steps lead through the castle gate into the courtyard, where there were, at one time, several buildings (the gatehouse, tower and cistern). The castle was built in the 14th century by the lords of Sparneck. In the midsummer of 1523 it was destroyed by the Swabian League. For some time the interior of the Red Castle was placed out of bounds due to massive cracks in the structure, but following renovations in 2008 the ruins are open to the public again.

== Devil's Table ==
In front of the castle gate is the legendary Devil's Table (Teufelstisch), a massive block of rock shaped like a mushroom that is topped by an oval slab. On the slab of this unique rock deep holes can still be seen, which according to legend, were caused by iron cards, with which the devil played with goblins and ghosts. This assumption is not, of course, based on historical evidence. Instead, the holes were part of a type of pavilion which was demolished in the late 19th century. The only evidence for this is the work of the engraver Gerd Könitzer who, in the middle of the 19th century, made several prints of the Waldstein summit and its various structures.

== The former Ostburg castle ==
In front of the steps up to the Schüssel observation pavilion are the remains of a wall, part of a late Romanesque chapel which belonged to the castle of Ostburg. At the northeastern foot of the Schüssel rock are the remains of the Ostburg itself, built in 1100, but abandoned in 1300 when the new Westburg castle was constructed. The walls of the former keep are still visible on the Schüssel rocks. During excavations several stone-age micro-blades, scrapers, and pierced pendant fragments made of Jurassic chert, which does not occur in the Fichtel Mountains, were found. It is therefore assumed that the summit of the Waldstein was used as a Stone Age staging post. In addition, fragments of pottery and metal objects came to light suggesting that fortifications must have existed here between the 8th and 10th centuries.

=== The chapel ===
The former chapel on the summit of the Waldstein was built at the same time as the Ostburg. It was decorated with small wall paintings and stained glass, and housed an altar as well as a holy chamber (Heiligster-Kammer). It was not abandoned with the Ostburg following the construction of the Westburg, but was still being maintained a good 200 years afterwards by the town of Weißenstadt. A number of church festivals of some kind were even held there. The chapel was probably not destroyed until 1430 during the Hussite Wars. During his excavations in the 1960s Karl Dietel found, among the many stone-age implements, a so-called votive cow (Votivrind). It is now believed that this cow was sacrificed to God to protect cows. This hypothesis is supported by the fact that the Church was dedicated to Saint Wolfgang, the protector of cattle. Also interesting was the discovery of four graves. One of them was empty, but in the other they found the skeletons of a man, a woman and a child. One of them had the marks of a sharp object above the pelvic bone and the legs were missing. Dietel suspected that the skeletons had been discovered during the construction of an extension of the chapel and the bodies were moved and buried nearby.

== The Schüssel ==
A bowl-shaped depression on the highest rocks of the Waldstein, to which there is a flight of steps, gave the rock its name. This name was transferred to the viewing pavilion, built in 1851 by the master forester, as King Maximilian II of Bavaria had announced his intention to pay a visit but, due to a shortage of time, did not come to the Waldstein. The pavilion was originally painted with blue and white diamonds and the holes glazed. The paint scheme and glass fell victim to the weather and are no longer visible today.

== Bear trap ==
Some 200 m west of the Waldsteinhaus stands a small building once used as a bear trap. It was originally mentioned on 3 April 1656 and is today the only one of its kind in Germany.

== Waldsteinhaus ==
The Waldsteinhaus is an unmanaged lodge in the immediate vicinity of the summit at a height of 855 m above NN. It is owned by the Fichtelgebirge Club and is open all year round.

=== History ===
The house was built in 1853 as Waldstein Hospice (Hospiz Waldstein) for a royal forest warden. In 1965 it was taken over by Fichtelgebirge Club and substantially upgraded in 1993.

During the Romantic period when there was a great interest in German history, castles and castle ruins were popular destinations. This led to an increase in the number of walkers to such places, who were taken in by "wild romance of the summit of the Waldstein with its rocky summit, its views and its ruins." This resulted in the construction of a welcoming little 'hunting lodge' being built in 1850 on top of the Waldstein in front of the ruins of the Red Castle and Devil's Table. As the flow of visitors increased "a permanent house was built" to accommodate guests. A woodcutter supplied the necessary beer. In 1853 the state had the Waldstein hospice or Waldsteinhaus built below the ruins and it was occupied by a forest warden. The foundation stone for this lodge was laid on 6 May 1853 and by 8 August 1853 the new building was opened. This hospice had a completely different look from that of the present Waldsteinhaus. It was largely made of wood in an "attractive Swiss chalet style", and was therefore a one-story wooden house. It served simple food and Weißenstadt beer and provided modest accommodation as well. On Sundays in the summer, it is recorded that groups of musicians from Münchberg, Schwarzenbach an der Saale and Hof gave brass band concerts, which were well attended. Then in 1889 the State Forestry Commission had the wooden building completely converted into a two-story brick building. The lower rooms were managed, the upper floor was living accommodation for the forester.

The opening of the branch line from Münchberg to Zell in 1902 brought even more walkers and visitors to the Waldstein and the Fichtelgebirge Club had the idea of erecting an extension to the existing Forestry Commission lodge. In 1906 negotiations over the property were held with the state, on 2 May 1907 the notary authorised the purchase of land and, on 21 June 1908, was the finished building was opened. Now, two houses stood side by side on the Waldstein. It was described as a 'shotgun marriage' and from the beginning the forester had the right to run both houses.

In 1964 the Forestry Commission lodge housed in the old building was closed and the lodge put up for sale. The Fichtelgebirge Club leased the lodge from the Forestry Commission in Bayreuth and, after protracted negotiations, bought the state-owned part of the house on 27 to December 1965. Now the Club was both owner and occupier of the entire area on the Waldstein summit, its local branch in Münchberg being responsible for upkeep since that time.

The last major investment was made by the Club in 1991. First, the Waldsteinhaus was connected to the public sewage system of the municipality of Zell by a 1.9 km long channel. Extensive construction and renovation took place in 1992/1993. The two originally separate houses were joined by a central section, and the entrance, kitchen, toilets and the guest rooms in the old forestry building were redesigned.

=== Hydraulic ram ===
The hydraulic ram on the Waldstein, invented by the Montgolfier brothers, has been pumping water for over 60 years without any losses. Remarkably, it operates without any motor or pump, but simply uses the power of the flowing water. It is located one kilometer west, and about 300 metres below, the Waldsteinhaus.

== Transmission site ==
In October 1960, the first turf was cut for the transmitter on the Große Waldstein. In May 1961 the site, built by the former Deutsche Bundespost, whose primary aim was to broadcast ZDF in northeastern Bavaria, went into operation. The antennas were supported on a 47-metre-high steel tube. However, this mast could only cover the area around Hof, so in June 1963 work started on a 133-metre-high, guyed, steel lattice mast (50°7′36″N 11°50′42″E) (25 km south of Hof). This mast, which has platforms for directional antennas at heights of 30, 35 and 60 metres, took over the broadcast of ZDF television programmes in December 1963. Just two months earlier, on 22 October 1963, the former RIAS launched the transmission of its second programme from the Große Waldstein.

- From 1980 to 1994 RIAS 1's FM programme was broadcast on 89.3 MHz (20 kW ERP). It was then taken over by Deutschlandradio Kultur.
- From 1964 to 1992 RIAS 2 was broadcast on 91.2 MHz (20 kW ERP), Deutschlandfunk. Since 1995, Bayerischer Rundfunk has used the frequency from the transmitter on the Ochsenkopf for broadcasting Bayern 1 to the Upper Palatinate.

Currently, the following VHF frequencies are used:

Programme	Frequency	Power (ERP)
Radio Euroherz and extra-radio	88.0 MHz	5 kW
Deutschlandradio Kultur	89.3 MHz	20 kW

Radio Euroherz and extra-radio share the frequency 88.0 MHz between them, broadcasting at different times.

As DVB-T began broadcasting from the transmission site at Ochsenkopf im November 2008, analogue TV broadcasts by ZDF and Bayerisches Fernsehen from the Großer Waldstein were ended.

== Sources ==
- Karl Dietel: Der Große Waldstein im Fichtelgebirge. Natur, Gegenwart, Geschichte, Fichtelgebirgsverein Hof 1987, (Das Fichtelgebirge; Band 1)
- Karl Dietel: Der Große Waldstein im Fichtelgebirge, Saalfrank, Helmbrechts, 1968, (Zwischen Waldstein und Döbraberg; Band 7)
- Karl Dietel: [several articles] in: Der Siebenstern, Vereinszeitschrift des Fichtelgebirgsvereins e. V.
- Ludwig Zapf: Waldsteinbuch, 1886
