= Höllpass =

Mountain pass in Bavaria, Germany

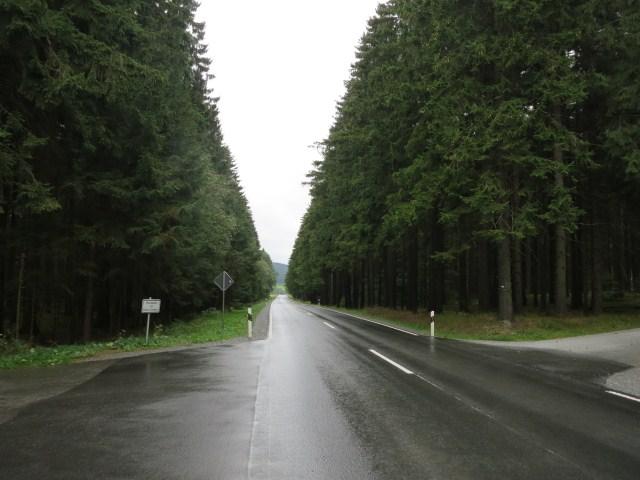
- Summit of the pass
- Interactive map of Höllpass
- Elevation: 683 metres (2,241 ft)
- Traversed by: Staatsstraße 2180

Third Approach
- Location: Districts of Bayreuth and Wunsiedel im Fichtelgebirge in Bavaria, Germany
- Range: Fichtel Mountains
- Coordinates: 50°05′46″N 11°48′46″E

The Höllpass is a 683 m high mountain pass in the northern part of the Fichtel Mountains in Bavaria, Germany.

The Höllpass is located in the northwest of the horseshoe-shaped Fichtel Mountains range, the horseshoe being open to the east. It lies between the ridges of the Waldstein to the north and the Schneeberg–Ochsenkopf Massif to the south, which were formed almost at right angles to the tectonic fault lines in the Fichtel Mountains.

The road running over the Höllpass – state road (Staatsstraße) number 2180 – climbs about 120 metres (390 ft) from the Kornbach valley near Gefrees to Torfmoorhölle in the borough of Weißenstadt.

== See also ==
- List of highest paved roads in Europe
- List of mountain passes
