= Lamitz =

River in Germany

- The Lamitz in Kirchenlamitz

Location
- Country: Germany
- State: Bavaria

Physical characteristics
- Mouth
  - location: Saale
  - coordinates: 50.2414°N 11.9367°E
- Length: 22.5 km (14.0 mi)

Basin features
- Progression: Saale→ Elbe→ North Sea

Lamitz is a river of Bavaria, Germany, whose source lies on the slopes of the Bergkopf mountain. It flows into the Saale in Fattigau.

== See also ==
- List of rivers of Bavaria
