= Rudolfstein (Fichtel Mountains) =

Mountain in Germany

Coordinates: 50°04′19″N 11°52′36″E

Rudolfstein (Fichtelgebirge)
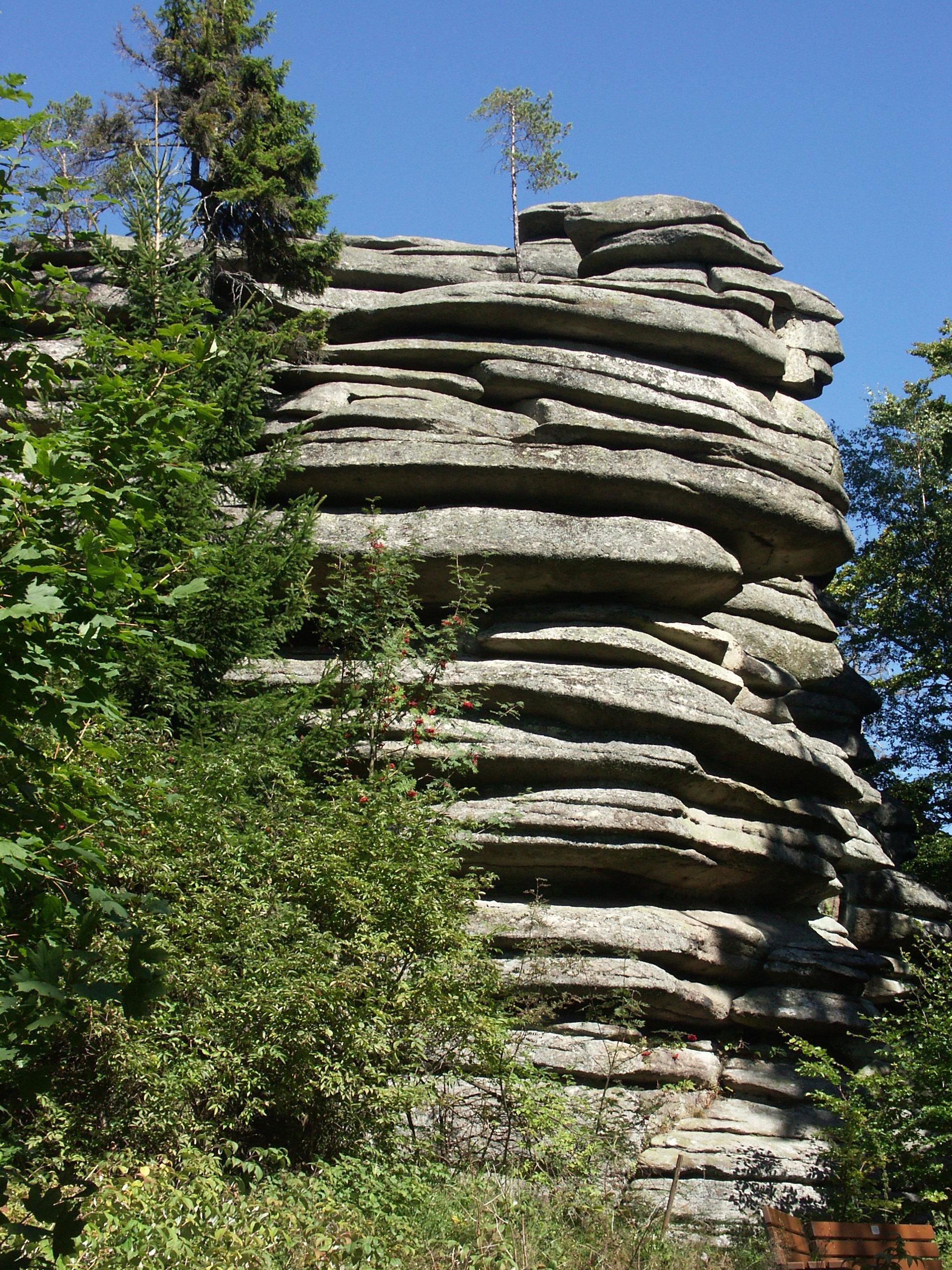
- Rocks at the Rudolfstein mountain

Highest point
- Elevation: 866 m (2,841 ft)

Geography
- Location: Bavaria, Germany

Rudolfstein (Fichtelgebirge) is a mountain of Bavaria, Germany.
