= Bad Weißenstadt =

- Town
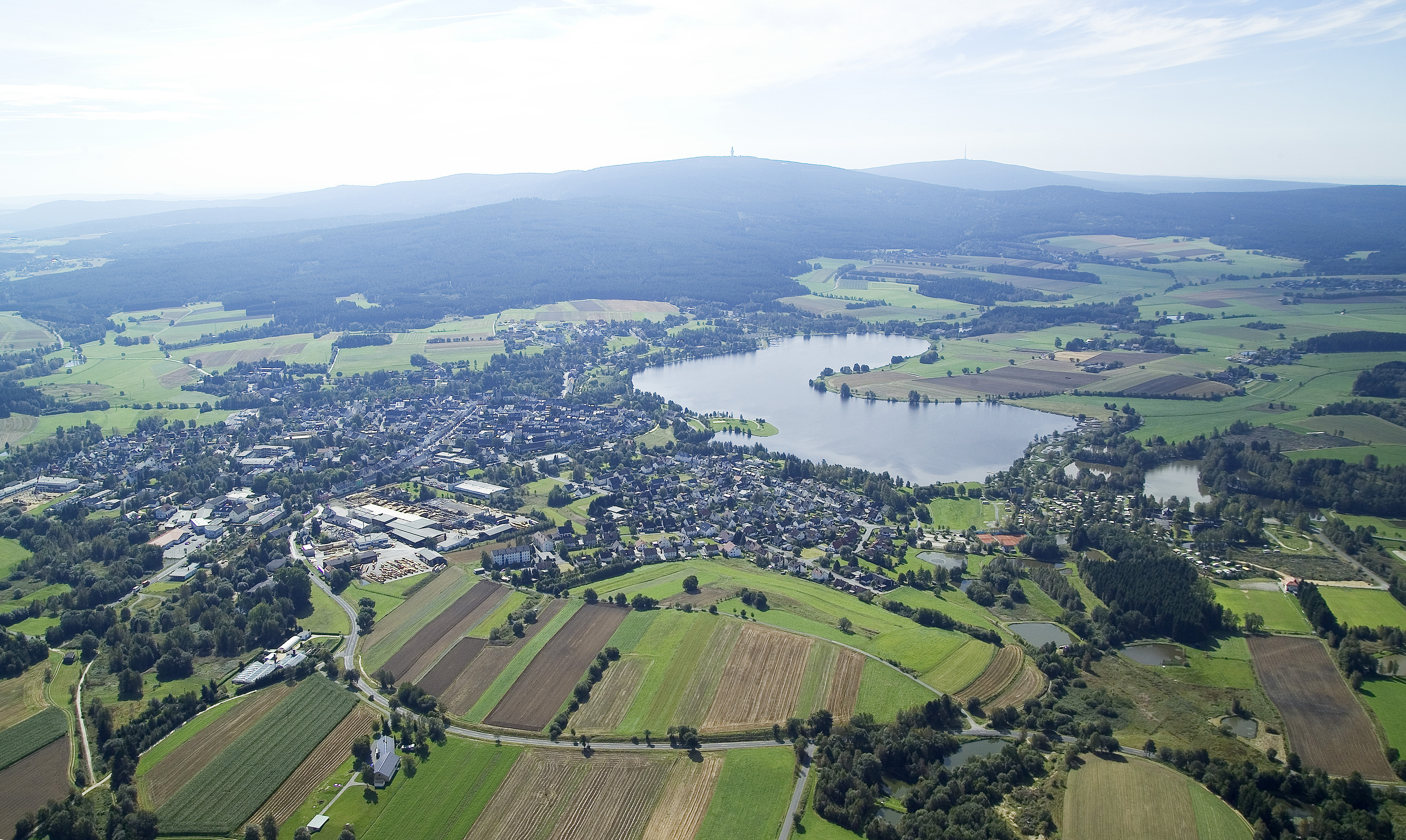
- Bad Weißenstadt am See (2005)

- Coat of arms

- Location of Bad Weißenstadt within Wunsiedel im Fichtelgebirge district
- Interactive map of Bad Weißenstadt
- Location within Germany Location within Bavaria
- Coordinates: 50°6′03″N 11°53′05″E
- Country: Germany
- State: Bavaria
- Admin. region: Oberfranken
- District: Wunsiedel im Fichtelgebirge

Government
  - Mayor (2020–26): Frank Dreyer (SPD)

Area
  - Total: 42.23 km^{2} (16.31 sq mi)
- Elevation: 630 m (2,070 ft)

Population (2025-12-31)
  - Total: 2,839
  - Density: 67.23/km^{2} (174.1/sq mi)
- Time zone: UTC+01:00 (CET)
  - Summer (DST): UTC+02:00 (CEST)
- Postal codes: 95163
- Dialling codes: 09253
- Vehicle registration: WUN
- Website: www.weissenstadt.de

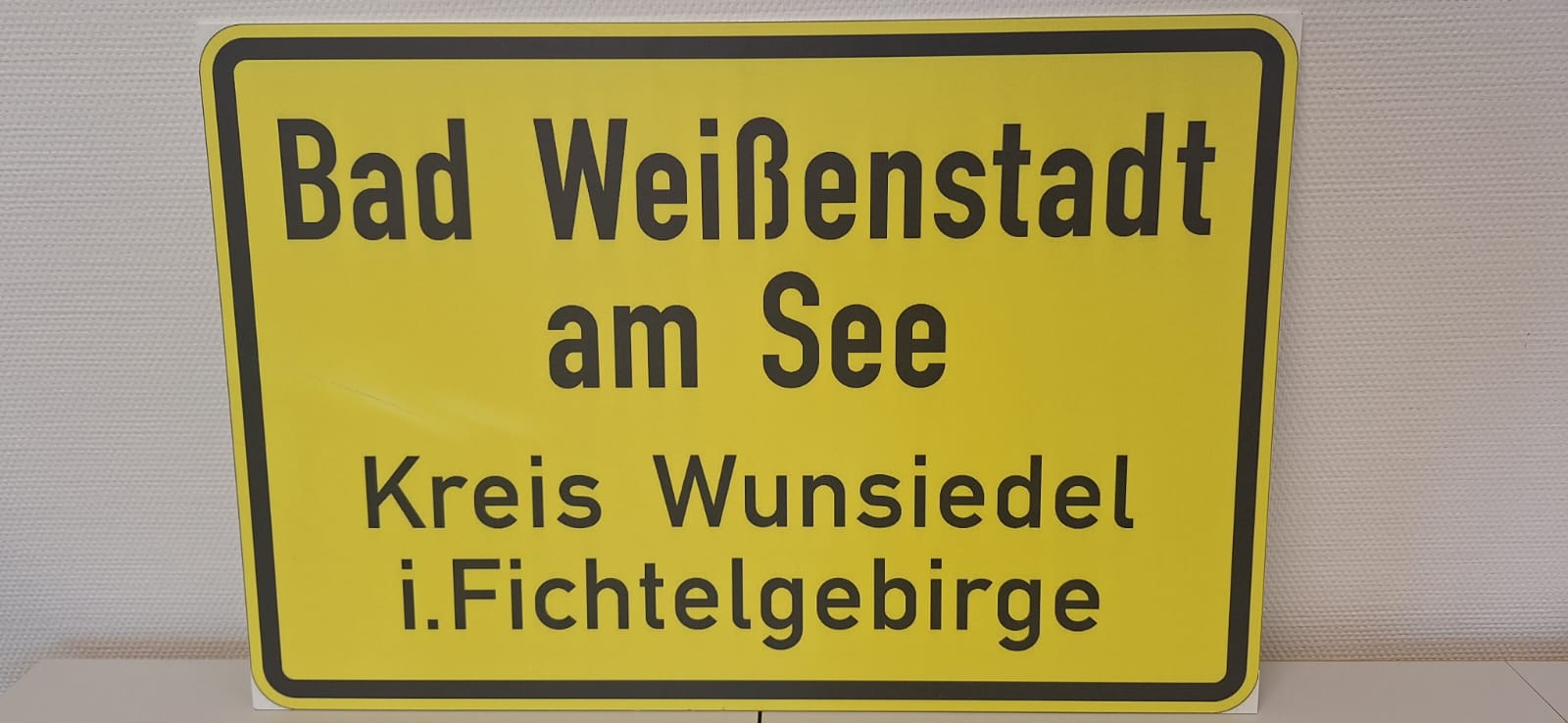
Bad Weißenstadt am See - sign

Bad Weißenstadt (German pronunciation: [baːt ˈvaɪsn̩ˌʃtat]), until July 2025 Weißenstadt ([ˈvaɪsn̩ˌʃtat]), is a town in the district of Wunsiedel, in Upper Franconia, Bavaria, Germany. It is situated on the shore of the picturesque Weißenstadter See (Weissenstadt Lake), in the Fichtel Mountains, on the river Ohře, 11 km northwest of Wunsiedel. The town got its name "White City" from the landmark church, once white now weathered dark grey. In 2025 it became the youngest "Bath-city" in Bavaria.

== Geography ==
The town nestles in the valley of the Ohře between the mountains of Waldstein and Rudolfstein and the pass of Höllpass on the plateau of the Fichtelgebirge.

=== Villages ===
The borough of Bad Weißenstadt incorporates the town itself and a number of villages:

- Birk
- Franken
- Frohnlohe
- Grub
- Grubbach
- Hühnerhöfen
- Lehsten
- Meierhof
- Neuenhammer
- Ruppertsgrün
- Schönlind
- Torfmoorhölle
- Voitsumra
- Weiherhöfen
- Weißenhaid
- Weißenhaider Mühle
- Weißenstadt
- Ziegelhütte bei Lehsten
- Grafenmühle

== Personalities ==
=== Sons and daughters of the city ===
- Heinrich Schneider (1905-1985), writer
- Peter Beauvais (1916–1986), actor and director
- Horst Hüttel (* 1968), ski jumping trainer

=== Personalities who have worked on the ground ===
- Erhard Ackermann (1813-1880), the founder of the industrial granite refinement in Germany
