= 1499 =

1499 in various calendars
- Gregorian calendar: 1499; MCDXCIX
- Ab urbe condita: 2252
- Armenian calendar: 948; ԹՎ ՋԽԸ
- Assyrian calendar: 6249
- Balinese saka calendar: 1420–1421
- Bengali calendar: 905–906
- Berber calendar: 2449
- English Regnal year: 14 Hen. 7 – 15 Hen. 7
- Buddhist calendar: 2043
- Burmese calendar: 861
- Byzantine calendar: 7007–7008
- Chinese calendar: 戊午年 (Earth Horse); 4196 or 3989 — to — 己未年 (Earth Goat); 4197 or 3990
- Coptic calendar: 1215–1216
- Discordian calendar: 2665
- Ethiopian calendar: 1491–1492
- Hebrew calendar: 5259–5260
- Hindu calendars
- Vikram Samvat: 1555–1556
- Shaka Samvat: 1420–1421
- Kali Yuga: 4599–4600
- Holocene calendar: 11499
- Igbo calendar: 499–500
- Iranian calendar: 877–878
- Islamic calendar: 904–905
- Japanese calendar: Meiō 8 (明応８年)
- Javanese calendar: 1416–1417
- Julian calendar: 1499; MCDXCIX
- Korean calendar: 3832
- Minguo calendar: 413 before ROC 民前413年
- Nanakshahi calendar: 31
- Thai solar calendar: 2041–2042
- Tibetan calendar: ས་ཕོ་རྟ་ལོ་ (male Earth-Horse); 1625 or 1244 or 472 — to — ས་མོ་ལུག་ལོ་ (female Earth-Sheep); 1626 or 1245 or 473

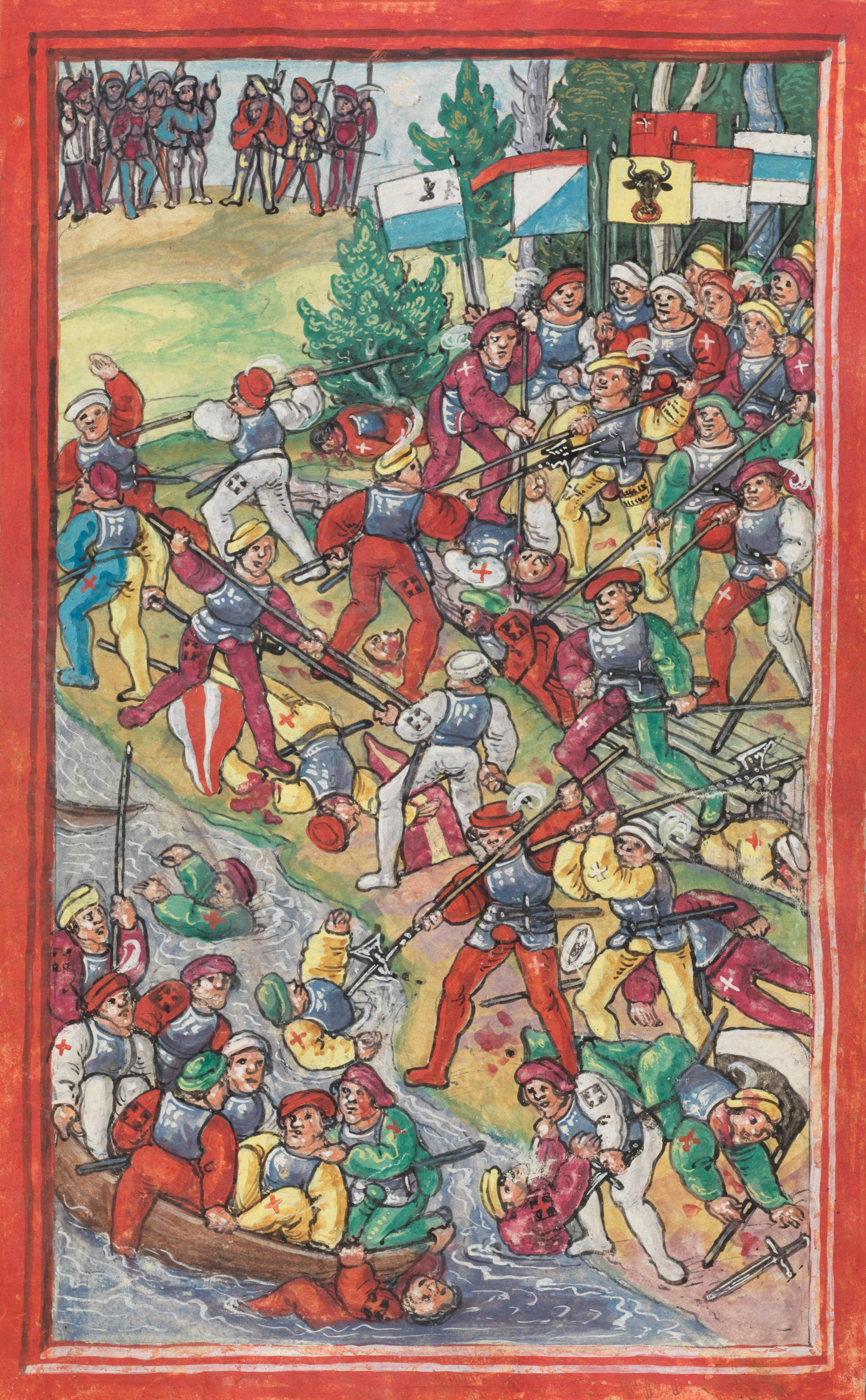
February 20: The Swiss Confederation defeats Holy Roman Empire troops at the Battle of Hard.

Year 1499 (MCDXCIX) was a common year starting on Tuesday of the Julian calendar.

== Events ==
=== January–March ===
- January 8 – Louis XII of France marries Anne of Brittany, in accordance with a law set by his predecessor, Charles VIII.
- February 4 – Hans, King of Denmark is formally crowned as King of Sweden and his wife Christina of Saxony crowned as Queen Consort.
- February 9 – The Treaty of Blois is signed between the Kingdom of France and the Republic of Venice as a secret military alliance between the two nations to attack the Duchy of Milan.
- February 20 – The Battle of Hard is fought near the village of Hard in modern-day western Austria as the Swiss Confederacy defeats the troops of the Holy Roman Empire in the first large-scale confrontation of the Swabian War.
- March 22 – At the Battle of Bruderholz, the Swiss Confederation defeats a larger force of troops from the Swabian League near Basel.

=== April–June ===
- April 11 – The Battle of Schwaderloh is won by the Swiss Confederacy over the Swabian League with more than 1,400 of the Swabian troops killed.
- April 20 – The Swiss Confederacy defeats the forces of the Holy Roman Empire in the Battle of Frastanz, with more than 2,000 Imperial troops killed.
- April 30 – The University of Valencia is founded in Spain with the passage of the University Statutes by the magistrates of Valencia.
- May 19 – Catherine of Aragon, the future first wife of Henry VIII, is married by proxy to his brother, Arthur, Prince of Wales.
- June 1 – Pedro Alonso Niño, who had accompanied Columbus on his first voyage to the New World in 1492, departs from Palos in Spain toward South America on a 7-month voyage to the New World. Niño sets sail in a small caravel with 33 men
- June 10 – Pope Alexander VI informs the Roman Catholic cardinals that the Sultan of the Ottoman Empire has amassed a fleet of 300 ships to lay siege to the city of Rhodes.
- June 15 – The Great Epidemic of plague reaches London, forcing King Henry and Queen Elizabeth to flee to the capital to Langley on June 25 and then to Abingdon.
- June 20 – Queen Isabella of Spain orders Christopher Columbus to liberate and repatriate Indians from the New World, declaring that nobody had authorized him to kidnap any of her subjects.

=== July–September ===
- July 22 – Battle of Dornach: The Swiss decisively defeat the army of Maximilian I, Holy Roman Emperor.
- July 28 – First Battle of Lepanto: The Turkish navy wins a decisive victory over the Venetians.
- August 24 – Lake Maracaibo is discovered, by Alonso de Ojeda and Amerigo Vespucci.
- August – Polydore Vergil completes De inventoribus rerum, the first modern history of inventions.
- September 18 – Vasco da Gama arrives at Lisbon, returning from India, and is received by King Manuel of Portugal.
- September 22 – Treaty of Basel: Maximilian is forced to grant the Swiss de facto independence.

=== October–December ===
- October 25 – The Pont Notre-Dame in Paris, constructed under Charles VI of France, collapses into the Seine.
- October 26 – King Louis XII of France and his troops seize Milan, driving out Duke Ludovico Sforza, and Leonardo da Vinci flees to Venice.
- November 5 – The Catholicon is published in Tréguier (Brittany). This Breton–greek–Latin dictionary had been written in 1464 by Jehan Lagadeuc. It is the first dictionary of either French or Breton.
- November 23 – Perkin Warbeck, pretender to the throne of England, is hanged for reportedly attempting to escape from the Tower of London.
- November 28 – Edward Plantagenet, 17th Earl of Warwick, last male member of the House of York, is executed for reportedly attempting to escape from the Tower of London.
- December 18 – The Rebellion of the Alpujarras (1499–1501) begins in the Kingdom of Granada (Crown of Castile) against the forced conversions of Muslims in Spain.

=== Date unknown ===
- Zeta, the last free monarchy in Southeastern Europe, is annexed by the Ottoman Empire, as part of the sanjak of Shkodër, and Stefan II Crnojević is removed from office.
- Johannes Trithemius inadvertently reveals interests in magic by writing a letter to a Carmelite friar about a treatise he is writing on steganography.
- Heinrich Cornelius Agrippa matriculates at Cologne University.
- Giggleswick School is founded by Reverend James Carr in England.

== Births ==
- January 15 – Samuel Maciejowski, Polish bishop (d. 1550)
- January 20 – Sebastian Franck, German humanist (d. 1543)
- January 29 – Katharina von Bora, German nun, wife of Martin Luther (d. 1552)
- February 10 – Thomas Platter, Swiss humanist scholar and writer (d. 1582)
- March 22 – Johann Carion, German astrologer and chronicler (d. 1537)
- March 31 – Pope Pius IV (d. 1565)
- May 14 – Agostino Gallo, Italian agronomist (d. 1570)
- June 24 – Johannes Brenz, German theologian and Protestant Reformer of the Duchy of Württemberg (d. 1570)
- July 17 – Maria Salviati, Italian noble and mother of Cosimo I de Medici (d. 1543)
- August 14 – John de Vere, 14th Earl of Oxford, English noble (d. 1526)
- September 3 – Diane de Poitiers, French duchess, mistress of Henry II of France (d. 1566)
- October 13 – Claude of France, queen consort of France, daughter of Louis XII (d. 1524)
- October 14 – Catherine of the Palatinate, Abbess of Neuburg am Neckar (d. 1526)
- October 31 – Günther XL, Count of Schwarzburg (1526–1552) (d. 1552)
- November 1 – Rodrigo of Aragon, Italian noble (d. 1512)
- December 8 – Sebald Heyden, German musicologist and theologian (d. 1561)
- December 13 – Justus Menius, German Lutheran pastor (d. 1558)
- date unknown
  - Hans Asper, Swiss painter (d. 1571)
  - Michael Coxcie, Flemish painter (d. 1592)
  - Cesare Hercolani, Italian military leader (d. 1534)
  - Jan Łaski, Polish Protestant reformer (d. 1560)
  - Laurentius Petri, Archbishop of Uppsala (d. 1573)
  - Giulio Romano, Italian painter (d. 1546)
  - Bernardino de Sahagún, Franciscan missionary (d. 1590)
  - Niccolò Fontana Tartaglia, Italian mathematician (d. 1557)
  - Ming, Icelandic clam (d. 2006)
- probable – Juan Rodríguez Cabrillo, Portuguese explorer (d. 1543)

== Deaths ==
- January 9 – John Cicero, Elector of Brandenburg (b. 1455)
- March 24 – Edward Stafford, 2nd Earl of Wiltshire, English nobleman (b. 1470)
- April 7 – Galeotto I Pico, Duke of Mirandola (b. 1442)
- August 29 – Alesso Baldovinetti, Florentine painter (b. 1427)
- October 1 – Marsilio Ficino, Italian philosopher (b. 1433)
- November 23 – Perkin Warbeck, Flemish imposter (b. c. 1474) (executed)
- November 28 – Edward Plantagenet, 17th Earl of Warwick, last male member of the English House of York (b. 1475)
- date unknown
  - Rennyo, leader of the Ikkō sect of Buddhism (b. 1415)
  - Muhammad Rumfa, ruler of Kano
  - Laura Cereta, Italian humanist and feminist (b. 1469)
