= List of battles involving the Old Swiss Confederacy =

List of battles fought by the Old Swiss Confederacy, 1315–1799.

The Battle of Morgarten of 1315 is famous as the first military success of the Confederacy, but it was an ambush on an army on the march rather than an open field battle. The Battle of Laupen of 1339 is an early battle that can be seen as indicating the trend of the dominance of infantry over heavy cavalry during the Late Middle Ages.

The classical period of military successes of Swiss halberd and pike warfare (pike square; in German Gevierthaufen or Gewalthaufen) are the wars of the Eight Cantons (Ten Cantons after 1481) during the 1360s to 1490s. Most notable among these are the Battle of Sempach (1386), the Burgundian Wars (1470s) and the Swabian War (1499).

The string of Swiss victories is broken in the early 16th century, and after a few painful defeats (notably at Marignano 1515), the Confederacy stopped its aggressive expansion. The early modern period is characterized by internal disputes, both religious and social (peasant uprisings). The final French invasion of Switzerland was only marginally a military operation and mostly a collapse due to centrifugal forces within the Confederacy.

== Early Confederacy (1315–1351) ==
Date	Battle	Site	Notes
Swiss Habsburg Wars
1315–18, 15 November	Battle of Morgarten	Oberägeri, Morgarten	
1315, 15 November	Gefecht am Renggpass (1315)	Alpnach	Unterwalden defeats Habsburg
1331–33	Gümmenenkrieg	Gümmenen	Bern and Solothurn defeat Fribourg and Habsburg
1332	Gefecht auf der Oberalp	Oberalppass	Urseren defeats Abbey of Disentis
1337, 21 September	Battle of Grynau	Grynau Castle respectively Linth plain	Zürich defeats Habsburg-Laufenburg
1339, 21 June	Battle of Laupen	Laupen	Bern and confederates defeat Fribourg and allies
1340, 24 April	Battle of Schönberg	Fribourg	Bern defeats Freiburg
1351, 26 December	Battle of Dättwil	Dättwil	Zürich defeats Habsburg

== Eight Cantons (1353–1477) ==
Date	Battle	Site	Notes
1375 – Guglerkrieg
1375, 25 December	Battle of Buttisholz	Buttisholz	Lucerne defeats English mercenaries
1375, 26 December	Battle of Ins	Ins	Bern defeats English mercenaries
1375, 27 December	Battle of Fraubrunnen	Fraubrunnen	Bern defeats English mercenaries
1380 Obwalden vs. Entlebuch
1380	Battle of Sörenberg	Flühli	Entlebuch defeats Obwalden
1383–84 – Burgdorferkrieg
1383–84	Siege of Burgdorf	Canton of Bern	Bern, Solothurn and allies defeat Neu-Kyburg
Swiss Habsburg Wars
1386, 9 July	Battle of Sempach	Sempach	Eight Cantons defeat Habsburg and allies
1388, 9 April	Battle of Näfels	Näfels	Glarus and Schwyz defeat Habsburg
Valais vs. Savoy
1388, December	Battle of Visp	Visp	Upper Valais defeats Savoy
1403–28 – Appenzell Wars
1403, 15 May	Battle of Vögelinsegg	St. Gallen	Appenzell and Schwyz defeat Abbey of St. Gallen and allies
1405, 16/17 June	Battle of Rotmonten	St. Gallen	City of St. Gallen defeats Habsburg
1405, 1 June	Battle of Stoss	Gais	Appenzell defeats Habsburg and Abbey of St. Gallen
1408, 13 January	Battle of Bregenz	Bregenz	Habsburg and order of St. Jörgenschild defeat Appenzell
1428, 2 December	Battle of Letzi	Herisau/Gossau	Count of Toggenburg defeats Appenzell
1409 Basel War
1409	skirmishes and raids	canton of Basel	Basel vs. Habsburg
1415 Annexation of Aargau
1415, April–May	Annexation of Aargau	Aargau	confederate conquest of Baden
1418–19 – Raron affair
1419, 29 September	Second Battle of Ulrichen	Ulrichen	Upper Valais defeats Bern
1403–1495 – War with Milan
1422, 30 June	Battle of Arbedo	Arbedo	Duchy of Milan defeats confederates
1449, 6 July	Battle of Castione	Castione	Milan defeats Uri and Leventina
1478, 28 December	Battle of Giornico	Giornico	Confederates defeat Milan
1487, 28 April	Battle of Crevola	Crevola d'Ossola	Milan defeats Confederates and Valais
1436–50 – Old Zürich War
1439, 5 May	Battle of Etzel	Etzelpass	Schwyz and Glarus defeat Zürich
1440, November	Battle of Pfäffikon	Pfäffikon SZ	Confederates defeat Zürich
1443, 22 May	Battle of Freienbach	Freienbach	Confederates defeat Zürich
1443, 24 May	Battle of Hirzel	Horgen	Confederates defeat Zürich
1443, 22 July	Battle of St. Jakob an der Sihl	Zürich	Lucerne, Uri, Schwyz, Unterwalden, Glarus and Zug defeat Zürich and Habsburg
1444, 28 May	Siege of Greifensee	Greifensee	Bern, Lucerne, Uri, Schwyz, Unterwalden, Glarus and Zug defeat Zürich and Habsburg
1444, 26 August	Battle of St. Jakob an der Birs	Basel	France defeats confederates
1444, 13 October	1st Battle of Erlenbach	Erlenbach ZH	Zürich defeats confederates
1445, 11 June	Battle of Wolfhalden	Wolfhalden	Appenzell defeats Habsburg
1445, 6 October	2nd Battle of Erlenbach	Erlenbach ZH	Zürich defeats confederates
1445, 29 October	Naval battle on Lake Zürich	Lake Zürich	Zürich defeats confederates
1445, 16 December	Battle of Wollerau (1445)	Wollerau	Confederates defeat Zürich
1446	Battle of Gams	Gams	Habsburg defeats Appenzell and Toggenburg
1446, 6 March	Battle of Ragaz	Bad Ragaz	Confederates defeat Zürich and Habsburg
1445–49 – St. Jakoberkrieg
1449	Siege of Rheinfelden	Rheinfelden	Basel vs. Habsburg
1447–48 – Freiburgkrieg
1448, 29 March	Battle of Neumatt	canton of Fribourg	Bern and Savoyen vs Fribourg and Habsburg
1448, 12 June	Battle of Tafers	Tafers	Fribourg defeats Bern
1460 – annexation of Thurgau
1460	various campaigns	Thurgau	confederate conquest of Thurgau
1468 – Waldshut War
1468	Siege of Waldshut	Waldshut	Confederates defeat Habsburg
1474–77 – Burgundian Wars
1474, 13 November	Battle of Héricourt	Héricourt	Confederates and Lower League defeat Duchy of Burgundy
1475, 13 November	Battle on the Planta	Sion	Confederates and Valais defeat Duchy of Savoy
1476, 2 March	Battle of Grandson	Grandson	Confederates defeat Burgundy
1476, 22 June	Battle of Murten	Murten	Confederates, Lothringia and Lower League defeat Burgundy
1477, 5 January	Battle of Nancy	Nancy	Lothringia, Lower League and Confederates defeat Burgundy

== Ten Cantons (1481–1500) ==
Date	Battle	Site	Notes
1489–90 – St. Gallerkrieg
1489, 28 July	Rorschacher Klosterbruch	Rorschach	Abbey of St. Gallen, Zürich, Luzern, Schwyz und Glarus vs. City of St. Gallen und Appenzell
1499 – Swabian War
1499, 12 February	Battle of Triesen	Triesen(FL)	Ten Cantons and Three Leagues defeat Habsburg and Swabian League
1499, 20 April	1st Battle of Hegau	Klettgau, Hegau	Confederates vs. Habsburg and Swabian League
1499, 22 February	Battle of Hard	Hard	Confederates defeat Habsburg and Swabian League
1499, 22 March	Battle of Bruderholz	Basel	Confederates defeat Habsburg and Swabian League
1499, 26 March	Battle of Hallau	Hallau	Confederates and Schaffhausen defeat Habsburg and Swabian League
1499, 11 April	Battle of Schwaderloh	Ermatingen	Confederates and Schaffhausen defeat Habsburg and Swabian League
1499, 17 April	2nd Battle of Hegau	Klettgau, Hegau	Confederates vs. Habsburg and Swabian League
1499, 20 April	Battle of Frastanz	Frastanz	Confederates defeat Habsburg and Swabian League
1499, 21 May	3rd Battle of Hegau	Klettgau, Hegau	Confederates vs. Habsburg and Swabian League
1499, 22 May	Battle of Calven	Taufers	Ten Cantons and Three Leagues defeat Habsburg and Swabian League
1499, 20 July	Battle of Rheineck	Rheineck	Confederates defeat Habsburg and Swabian League
1499, 22 July	Battle of Dornach	Dornach	Confederates defeat Habsburg and Swabian League
1495–1522 – Italian Wars
1500	Treason of Novara	Milan	re-conquest of Milan for Ludovico Sforza

== Thirteen Cantons (1512–1540) ==
Date	Battle	Site	Notes
1495–1522 – Italian Wars
1512	1st Battle of Pavia	Pavia	Confederates defeat France
1513, 6 June	Battle of Novara	Novara	Confederates defeat France
1513, September	Dijon campaign	Dijon	siege of Dijon
1515, 13/14 September	Battle of Marignano	Melegnano	France and Venice defeat the Confederates
1522, 27 April	Battle of Bicocca	Bicocca, Milan	Habsburg defeats France and Confederates
1525, 23/24 February	2nd Battle of Pavia	Pavia	Habsburg defeats France and Confederates
Rural uprisings
1513	Köniz uprising	Köniz	Köniz vs. Bern
1513–14	Zwiebelnkrieg	canton of Luzern	Uprising against Lucerne
1515	Lebkuchenkrieg	canton of Zürich	Uprising against Zürich
1524–26	German Peasants' War	Holy Roman Empire, Swabia	Widespread peasant uprisings
1525–31 Wars of Religion
1525–26	1st Musso War	Chiavenna	Three Leagues vs. Milan
1529	First War of Kappel	Kappel	Catholic cantons vs. Zürich
1531–32	2nd Musso War	Lombardy	Confederates and Three Leagues vs. Milan
1531, 11 October	Battle of Kappel	Kappel	Catholic cantons vs. Zürich
1531, 24 October	Battle of Gubel	Menzingen	Catholic cantons vs. Bern and Zürich
1536 – Bernese conquests in Savoy
1536	Conquest of Vaud	Canton of Vaud	Bern, Fribourg and Valais vs. Savoy

== Early Modern conflicts (1550–1712) ==
After their defeats in Italy, the Confederacy pledged neutrality and did not engage in further warfare beyond its borders. For the remaining duration of the Old Swiss Confederacy 1540–1798, armed conflicts were internal, either between factions within the confederacy, or peasant uprisings. Also listed are conflicts between associates of the Confederacy (Three Leagues, Geneva) with neighbouring powers even if the Confederacy itself was not involved.

Date	Battle	Site	Notes
Rural uprisings
1550	Trinkelstierkrieg	Valais	peasant uprisings in Valais
1570	1st Heringskrieg	canton of Lucerne	Rothenburg vs. Lucerne
1591–94	Rappenkrieg	canton of Basel	uprising against Basel
1602 – Savoy Wars
1602, 11/12 December	Escalade de Genève	Geneva	Geneva defeats Savoy
1618–48 – Thirty Years' War
1621–39	Bündner Wirren	Graubünden	Graubünden is occupied and ravaged
1632, 20 September	Kluser Handel	Balsthal	Solothurn vs. Bern
1653 – Swiss Peasant War
1653, 29 May/7 June	Battle of Herzogenbuchsee	Herzogenbuchsee	peasant uprising
1653, 3 June	Battle of Wohlenschwil	Wohlenschwil	peasant uprising
1656 – First War of Villmergen
1656, 7 January/10 February	Siege of Rapperswil	Rapperswil SG	Catholic cantons defend Rapperswil against Zürich
1656, 24 January	First Battle of Villmergen	Villmergen	Lucerne and Zug defeat Bern und Zürich
1712 – Toggenburg War a.k.a. Second War of Villmergen
1712, ?–22 May	Siege of Wil	Wil	Protestant cantons and rebels defeat prince-abbot of St Gall
1712, 22 May	Battle of Mellingen	Mellingen	Bern defeats Catholic cantons
1712, 26 May	Battle of Fischbach	Fischbach-Göslikon	Bern defeats Catholic cantons
1712, ?–1 June	Siege of Baden	Baden, Switzerland	Bern and Zürich defeat Catholic cantons
1712, 20 July	Battle of Sins	Sins, Aargau	Catholic cantons defeat Bern
1712, 22 July	Battles of Richterswil and Hütten	Richterswil and Hütten, Switzerland	Schwyz and Zug attack Zürich unsuccessfully
1712, 24 July	Second Battle of Villmergen	Villmergen	Bern defeats Catholic cantons

== French invasion (1798) ==
These are minor skirmishes on 2–5 March 1798, leading to the swift collapse of the Old Confederacy, the clashes of April and May last pockets of resistance against the recently established Helvetic Republic. The Nidwalden uprising (Schreckenstage von Nidwalden) in September was more serious, with 435 dead, including 118 women and 25 children. The 1799 conflict in the Valais was not a "Battle of the Old Swiss Confederacy" in the narrow sense, as Valais was not a member of the Old Confederacy. The Valais formed the separate Rhodanic Republic in 1802 and joined the restored Swiss Confederacy only in 1815.

Date	Battle	Site	Notes
1798, 2 March	Battle of Lengnau	Lengnau	France vs. Bern
1798, 2 March	Battle of Twann	Twann	France vs. Bern
1798, 2 March	Battles of Grenchen and Bellach	Grenchen, Bellach	France defeats Solothurn
1798, 3 March	Battle of Col de la Croix	Col de la Croix	France vs. Bern
1798, 5 March	Battle of St. Niklaus	Merzligen	France vs. Bern
1798, 5 March	Battle of Fraubrunnen	Fraubrunnen	France defeats Bern
1798, 5 March	Battle of Grauholz	Schönbühl	France defeats Bern
1798, 5 March	Battle of Neuenegg	Neuenegg	Bern defeats France
1798, 26 April	Battle of Hägglingen	Hägglingen	France defeats Zug
1798, 30 April	Battle of Wollerau	Wollerau	France defeats Schwyz
1798, 1 May	Battle of Stucketen-Chäppeli	Beinwil SO	France vs. Solothurn
1798, 2 May	Battle of Schindellegi	Feusisberg	France defeats Schwyz
1798, 2/3 May	Battle of Rothenthurm	Rothenthurm	Schwyz defeats France
1798, 17 May	1st Battle of Pfyn	Sion	France defeats Valais
1798, 7–9 September	Nidwalden uprising	Nidwalden	France defeats Nidwalden
1799, 27–28 May	2nd Battle of Pfyn	Sion	France defeats Valais

== See also ==
- List of wars involving Switzerland
- Military history of Switzerland
- Growth of the Old Swiss Confederacy
- List of battles 1301–1600
- List of battles 1601–1800
