= Battle of Villmergen =

Battle of Villmergen may refer to either of two battles between the Reformed and Catholic cantons of Switzerland fought at Villmergen (47°21′N 8°15′E) in the canton of Aargau:

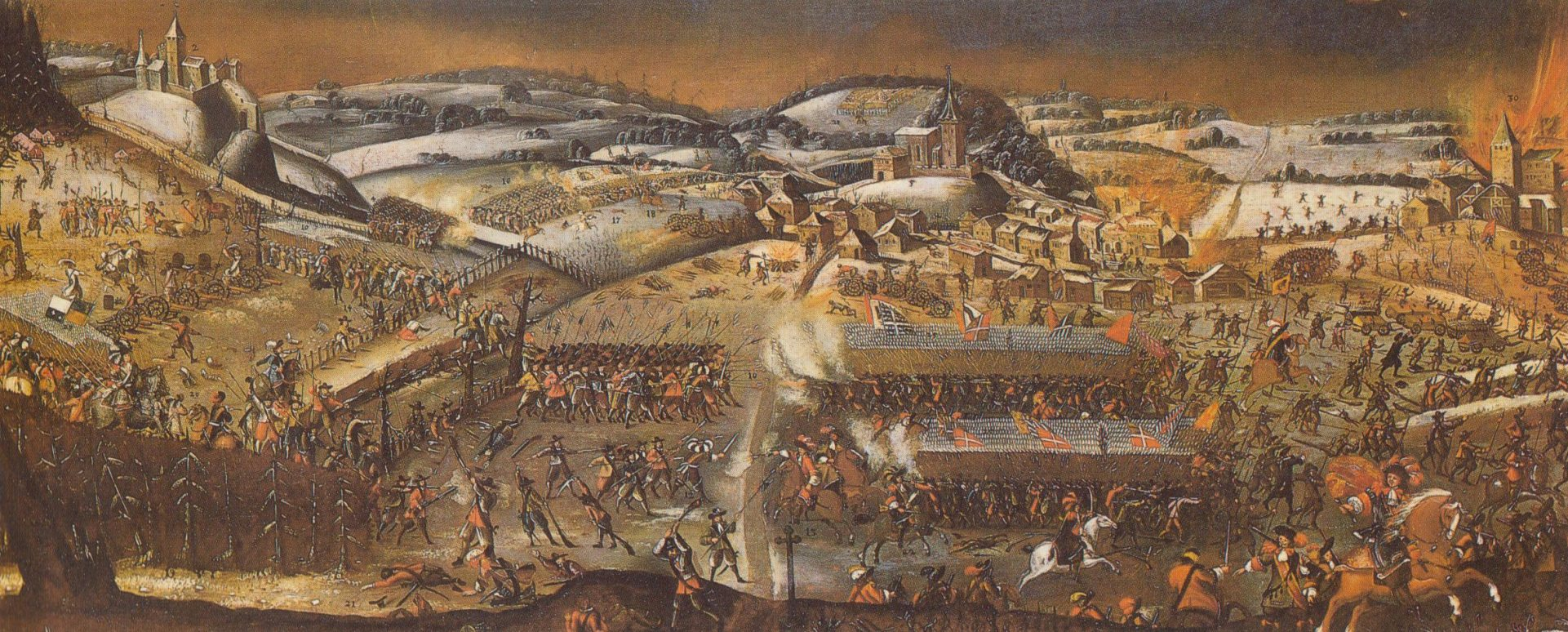
Painting of first battle of Villmergen (1656) in Switzerland, probably of the XVIIIth century.

- a battle of the First War of Villmergen, fought on 24 January 1656
- a battle of the Toggenburg War (or Second War of Villmergen), fought on 24 July 1712

== See also ==
- Battles of the Old Swiss Confederacy
