= Treaty of Basel =

There were several Treaties of Basel:

- Treaty of Basel (1499)
- Peace of Basel (1795)
- The Basel Convention on the Control of Transboundary Movements of Hazardous Wastes and Their Disposal (1989)
