= Galeazzo Visconti (envoy) =

Italian diplomat (1455–1531)

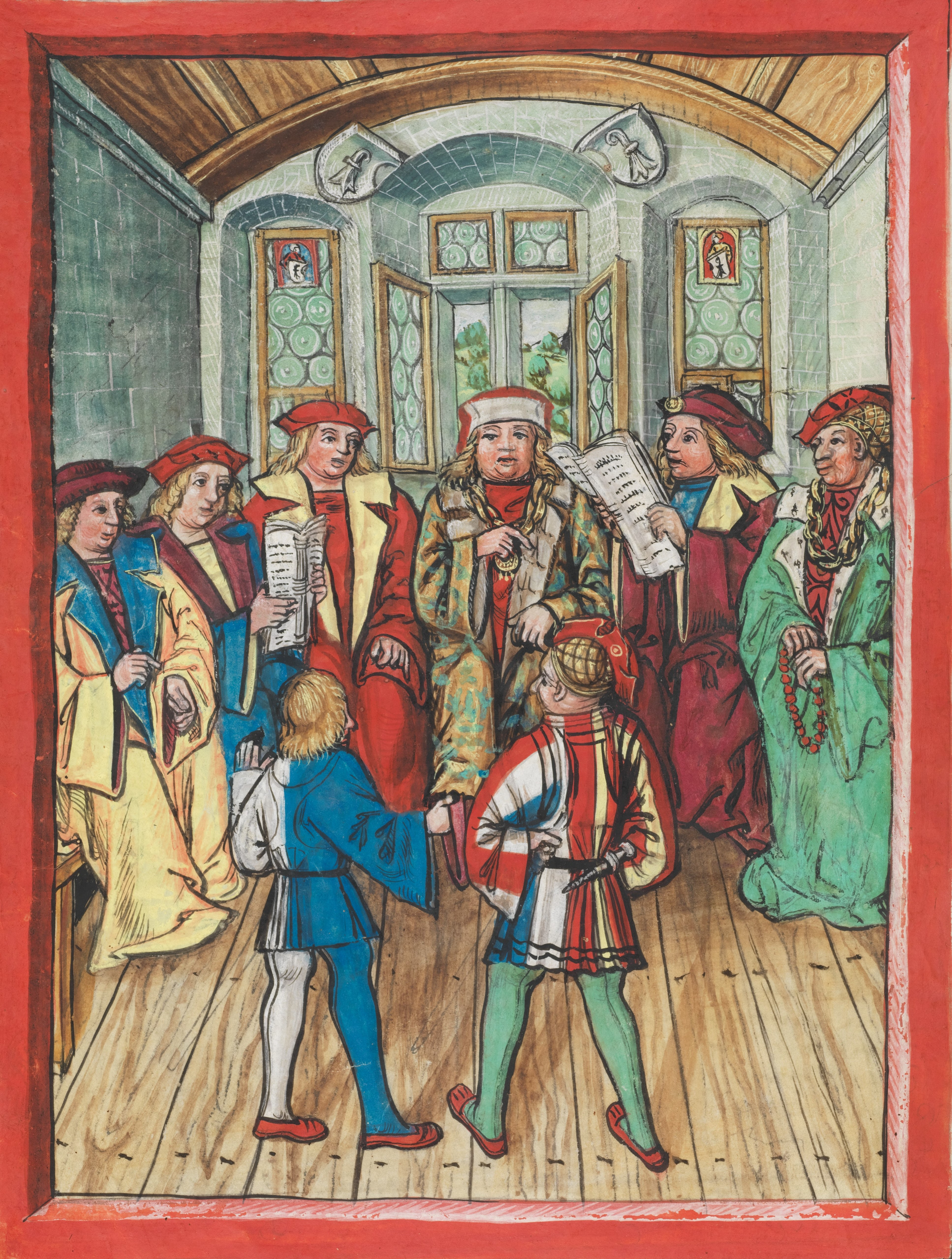
Negotiations for the Treaty of Basel in 1499 at the end of the Swabian War. The Milanese envoy Galeazzo Visconti presents his peace proposals to the delegation of Holy Roman Emperor Maximilian I at the city hall of Basel. A delegate from Lucerne (front left, in the blue-white dress) translates.

Galeazzo Visconti known as Messer Vesconte (1455 – 1531), was Count of Busto Arsizio, military captain and trusted courtier of Ludovico il Moro, cavalier servant of his wife Beatrice d'Este. An envoy represented Ludovico Sforza, the deposed Duke of Milan, at the negotiations for the Treaty of Basel (1499).
