= Swabian War =

Swiss conflict against the Habsburgs

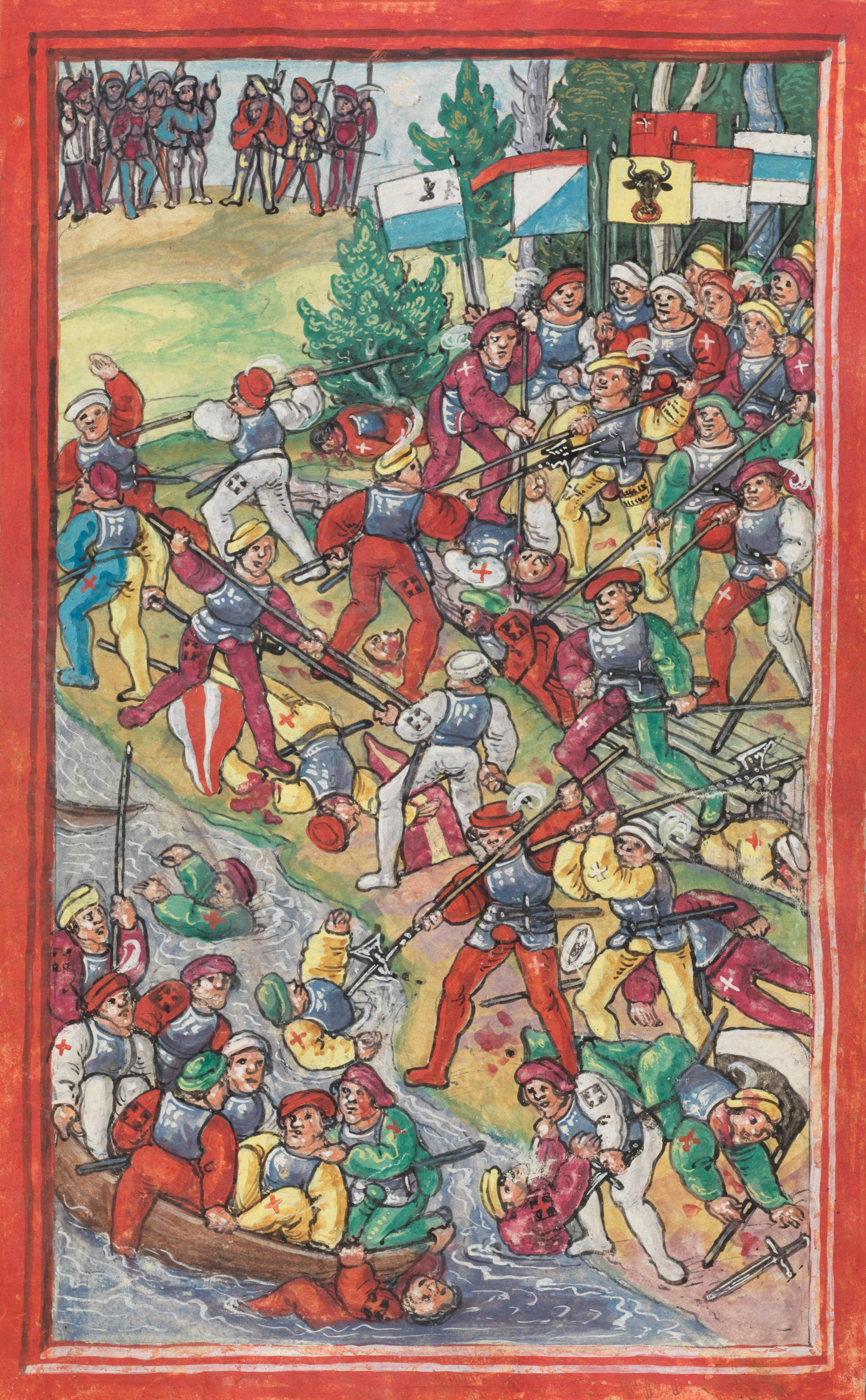
- The battle of Hard was the first major battle of the Swabian War. Illustration from the Luzerner Schilling of 1513.
Date	January – September 1499
Location	Northern and eastern boundary of Switzerland, southern Grisons.
Result	Swiss victory Peace of Basel: Swiss Confederacy exempt from the resolutions of the Imperial Diet of Worms (1495).

Belligerents
Swabian League Holy Roman Empire	Old Swiss Confederacy Three Leagues of the Grisons

The Swabian War of 1499 (Alemannic German: Schwoobechrieg; spelling depending on dialect), called Schwabenkrieg or Schweizerkrieg ("Swiss War") in Germany and Engadiner Krieg ("War of the Engadin") in Austria, was the last major armed conflict between the Old Swiss Confederacy and the House of Habsburg. What had begun as a local conflict over the control of the Val Müstair and the Umbrail Pass in the Grisons soon got out of hand when both parties called upon their allies for help; the Habsburgs demanding the support of the Swabian League, while the Federation of the Three Leagues of the Grisons turned to the Swiss Eidgenossenschaft. Hostilities quickly spread from the Grisons through the Rhine valley to Lake Constance and even to the Sundgau in southern Alsace, the westernmost part of the Habsburg region of Further Austria.

Many battles were fought from January to July 1499, and in all but a few minor skirmishes, the experienced Swiss soldiers defeated the Swabian and Habsburg armies. After their victories in the Burgundian Wars, the Swiss had battle-tested troops and commanders. On the Swabian side, distrust between the knights and their foot soldiers, disagreements amongst the military leadership, and a general reluctance to fight a war that even the Swabian counts considered to be more in the interests of the powerful Habsburgs than in the interest of the Holy Roman Empire proved fatal handicaps. When his military high commander fell in the Battle of Dornach, where the Swiss won a final decisive victory, Emperor Maximilian I had no choice but to agree to a peace treaty signed on September 22, 1499, in Basel. The treaty granted the Confederacy far-reaching independence from the empire. Although the Eidgenossenschaft officially remained a part of the empire until the Treaty of Westphalia in 1648, the peace of Basel exempted it from the imperial jurisdiction and imperial taxes and thus de facto acknowledged it as a separate political entity.

== Background ==
One source of conflict was the ancient distrust, rivalry, and hostility between the Old Swiss Confederacy and the House of Habsburg, which had risen to the throne of the Holy Roman Emperor since 1438. Since the late 13th century, the members of the Swiss Confederacy had gradually taken control of territories that once had belonged to the Habsburg realm. The Swiss had attained the status of imperial immediacy, being subject only to the emperor himself, and not to any intermediate Princes or liege lords. This status granted them a far-reaching autonomy within the Holy Roman Empire, even more so as the emperor was a distant overlord. Before 1438, the empire and the emperor had been an antipole to the Habsburg dukes for the Swiss. Previous emperors had repeatedly supported the confederates in their struggles against the Habsburgs, whom they saw as strong rivals. They had confirmed the Imperial immediacy of the Swiss on several occasions; and the Swiss had succeeded in defending their privileged status against Habsburg dukes who had tried to regain their former territories.

=== Habsburgs in the Holy Roman Empire in the 15th century ===
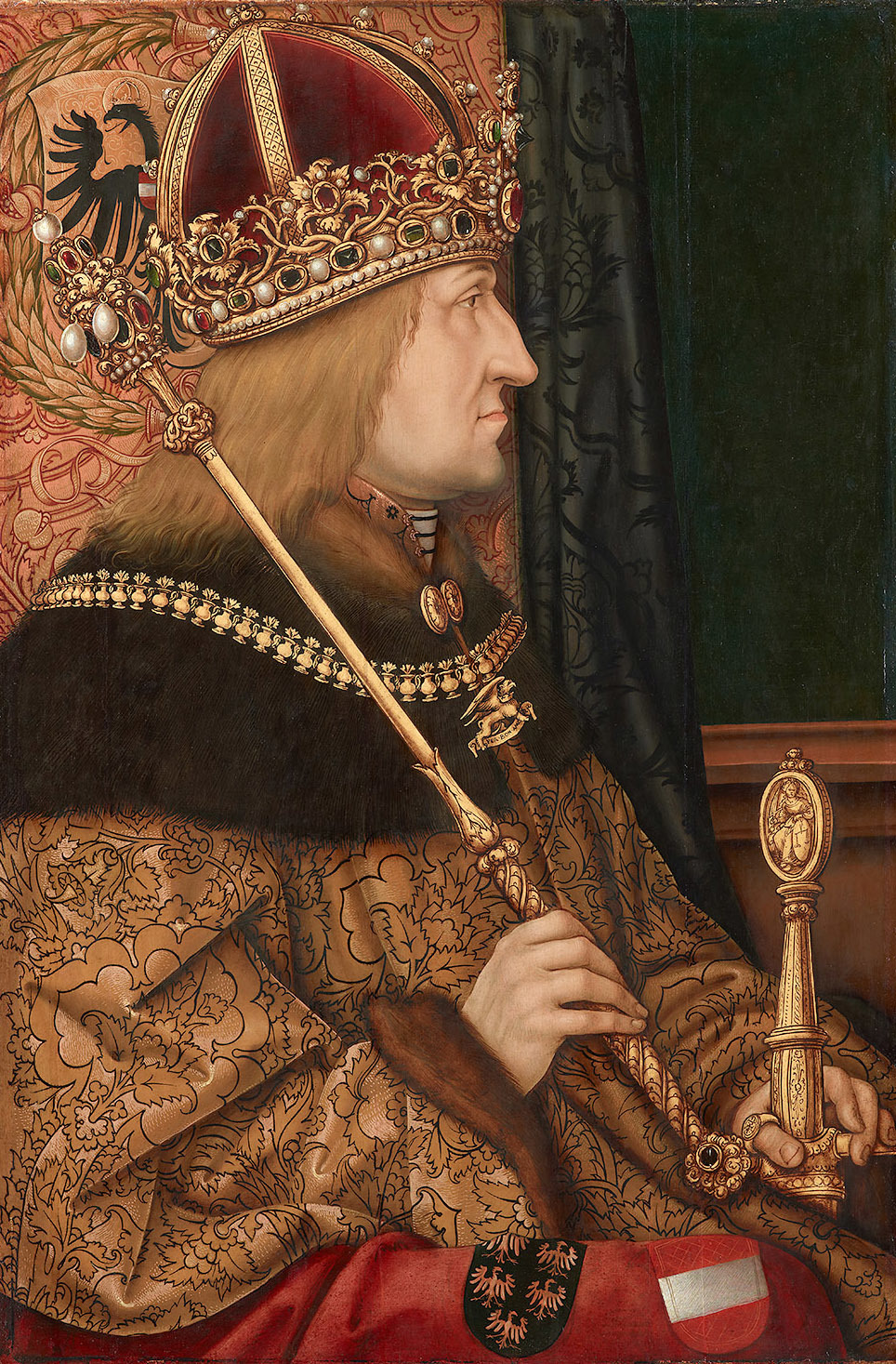
Emperor Frederick III

When Frederick III of Habsburg ascended to the throne, the Swiss suddenly faced a new situation in which they could no longer count on support from the empire. Worse yet, conflicts with the Habsburg dukes threatened to become conflicts with the empire itself. Under Frederick's reign, this did not occur yet. Frederick had sided in 1442 against the confederacy in the Old Zürich War where he had supported the city of Zürich, and he also refused to reconfirm the imperial immediacy of the members of the Confederacy. But Frederick's troubled reign did not leave room for military operations against the Swiss. In Austria, Frederick was in conflict first with his brother Albert and then faced the pressure of Matthias Corvinus, who even drove him from Vienna and forced Frederick's court to assume an itinerant lifestyle.

In the empire, Frederick faced the opposition of the Bavarian Wittelsbach dynasty and of his cousin Sigismund, who was duke in Tyrol, Vorarlberg, and Further Austria then. Sigismund had been in conflict with the Swiss Confederacy, too. When he had been banned by Pope Pius II in a conflict over the nomination of a bishop in Tyrol, the Swiss had annexed the formerly Habsburg territories of the Thurgau. In 1468, Sigismund clashed with the Swiss in the War of Waldshut, which he could end without significant territorial losses only by paying a large ransom, which he financed by pawning territories in the Sundgau and the Alsace to Charles the Bold of Burgundy in 1469. Charles did not, however, help Sigismund against the Swiss, and so Sigismund bought back the territories in 1474 and concluded a peace treaty with the Confederacy, the Ewige Richtung, although the emperor never recognized it. In the following Burgundy Wars, the Swiss and Sigismund both fought against Charles the Bold.

In 1487, Sigismund arranged the marriage of Frederick's daughter Kunigunde to Duke Albert IV of Bavaria against her father's will, and he also signed away some of his territories in Tyrol and Further Austria to Albert IV. Frederick intervened by force: he founded the Swabian League in 1488, an alliance of the Swabian cities, the Swabian knights of the League of St. George's Shield and the counts of Württemberg and Tyrol and Vorarlberg. With their help, he forced the Wittelsbach house to return the territories signed over by Sigismund.

In 1490, Sigismund was forced to abdicate and turn over all his territories to Frederick's son Maximilian I. Maximilian had married Mary of Burgundy in 1477 after the death of Charles the Bold in the Burgundy Wars and thus inherited the Burgundian territories: the Duchy of Burgundy, the County of Burgundy (Franche-Comté) and the Netherlands. He took over and expanded the Burgundian administration with a more centralized style of government, which in 1482, caused the outbreak of a rebellion of the cities and counts, allied with Charles VIII of France, against Maximilian. The Duchy of Burgundy was also a French fiefdom and immediately claimed by Charles VIII. The first phase of this conflict would last until 1489, keeping Maximilian occupied in the Low Countries. He even fell into the hands of his enemies and was held prisoner for four months in Bruges in 1488. He was freed only when his father sent an army under the command of Duke Albert of Saxony to his rescue. Maximilian subsequently returned to Germany, leaving his cousin Albert as his representative. Albert would, in the following years, manage to assert the Habsburg hegemony in the Netherlands.

Maximilian had been elected King of the Romans in 1486 on his father's initiative, and they had been ruling jointly since then. Upon the death of Frederick in 1493, Maximilian also took over his father's possessions and thus united the whole Habsburg territory in his hands. In the same year, the Peace of Senlis also marked the end of his wars against the French about his Burgundian possessions; he kept the territories in the Netherlands and also the County of Burgundy, but had to cede the Duchy of Burgundy to the French king. Maximilian controlled thus territories that nearly encircled the Old Swiss Confederacy: Tyrol and Vorarlberg in the east, Further Austria in the north, and the County of Burgundy in the west.

=== Swabia and the Swiss ===
When asked by Emperor Frederick to also join the Swabian League, the Eidgenossen flatly refused: they saw no reason to join an alliance designed to further Habsburg interests, and they were wary of this new, relatively closely knit and powerful alliance that had arisen on their northern frontier. Furthermore, they resented the strong aristocratic element in the Swabian League, so different from their own organization, which had grown over the last two hundred years liberating themselves from precisely such an aristocratic rule.

On the Swabian side, similar concerns existed. For the common people in Swabia, the independence and freedom of the Eidgenossen was a powerful and attractive role model. Many a baron in southern Swabia feared that his own subjects might revolt and seek adherence to the Swiss Confederacy. These fears were not entirely without foundation: the Swiss had begun to form alliances north of the Rhine river, concluding a first treaty with Schaffhausen in 1454 and then also treaties with cities as far away as Rottweil (1463) and Mulhouse (1466).

The city of Constance and its bishop were caught in the middle between these two blocks: they held possessions in Swabia, but the city also still exercised the high justice over the Thurgau, where the Swiss had assumed the low justice since the annexation in 1460. The foundation of the Swabian League prompted the Swiss city states of Zürich and Bern to propose accepting Constance into the Swiss Confederacy. The negotiations failed, though, due to the opposition of the founding cantons of the Confederacy and Uri in particular. The split jurisdiction over the Thurgau was the cause of many quarrels between the city and the Confederacy. In 1495, one such disagreement was answered by a punitive expedition of soldiers of Uri and the city had to pay the sum of 3,000 guilders to make them retreat and cease their plundering. (The Thurgau was a condominium of the Swiss Confederacy, and Uri was one of the cantons involved in its administration.) Finally, Constance joined the Swabian League as a full member on November 3, 1498. Although this did not yet definitively define the position of the city—during the Reformation, it would be allied again with Zürich and Bern, and only after the defeat of the Schmalkaldic League in 1548 its close connections to the Eidgenossenschaft would be finally severed—it was another factor contributing to the growing estrangement between the Swiss and the Swabians.

The competition between Swiss (Reisläufer) and Swabian mercenaries (Landsknechte), who both fought in armies throughout Europe, sometimes opposing each other on the battlefield, sometimes competing for contracts, intensified. Contemporary chronicles agree in their reports that the Swiss, who were considered the best soldiers in Europe at the time after their victories in the Burgundian Wars, were subject to many taunts and abuses by the Landsknechte; they were called "Kuhschweizer"^{[a]} and ridiculed in other ways. Such insults were neither given nor taken lightly, and frequently led to bloodshed. Indeed, such incidents would contribute to prolong the Swabian War itself by triggering skirmishes and looting expeditions that the military commands of neither side had ever wanted or planned.

=== Imperial reform of 1495 ===
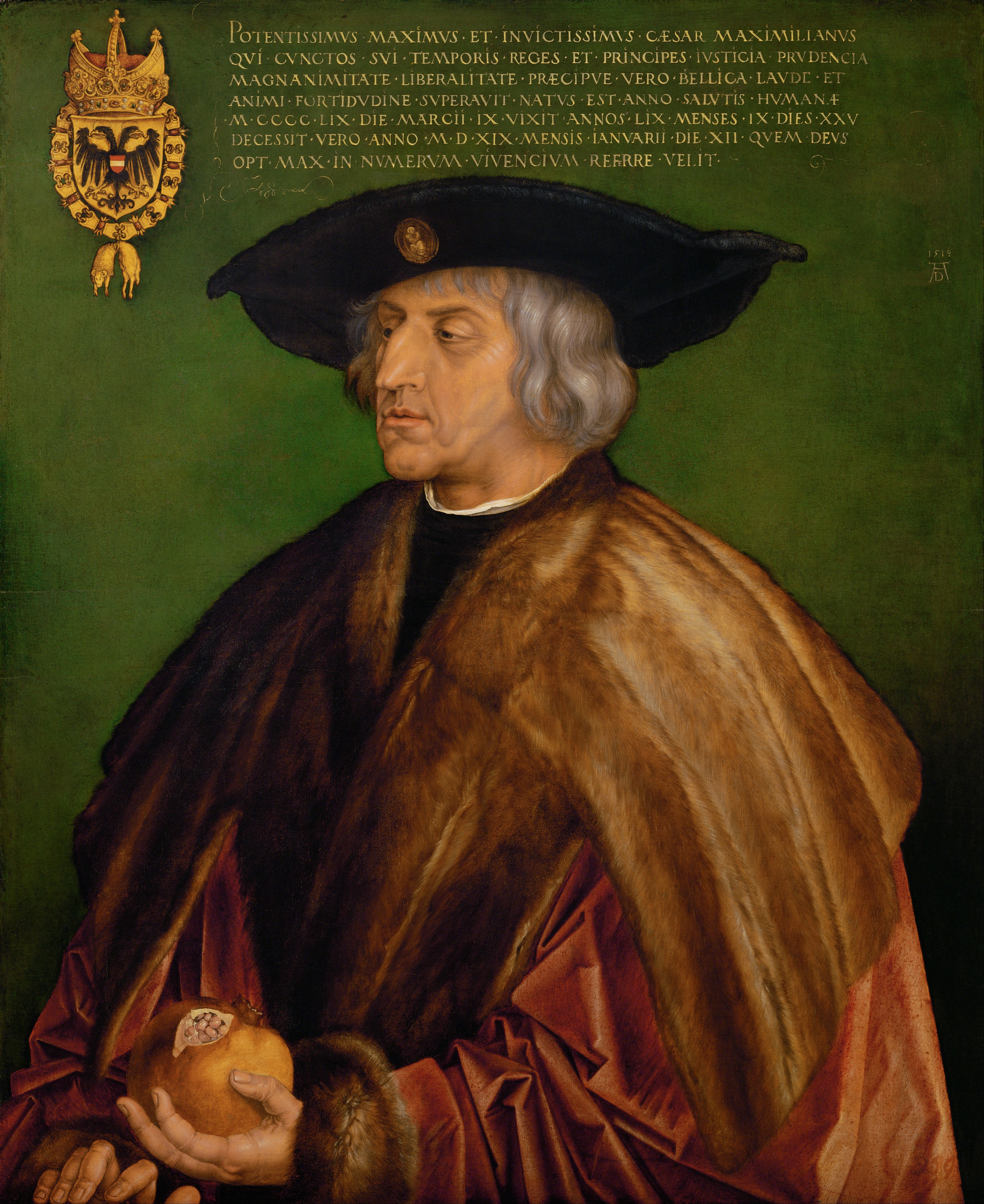
Emperor Maximilian I in a painting from 1519 by Albrecht Dürer

Maximilian I, like other Holy Roman Emperors before and after him, had to face struggles with other powerful princes in the empire and he thus sought to secure his position and the imperial monarchy by furthering centralisation. At the Imperial Diet held in Worms in 1495, the emperor and princes joined force to proclaim an "eternal public peace" (Ewiger Landfriede) to put an end to the abounding feuds and the anarchy of the robber barons and it defined a new standing Imperial Army to defend the Reich, to which each imperial estate (Reichsstand) would have had to send troops. It also mandated the common penny (Reichspfennig), a new head tax to finance this army and other institutions, although this tax never became viable during Maximilian's reign.

The Swiss did not accept these resolutions of the Imperial Diet, and they explicitly refused to pay the common penny. They had no interest whatsoever in sending troops to serve in an army under Habsburg authority, nor in paying taxes, nor would they accept any foreign court's jurisdiction; and they had succeeded in securing public peace within their territories reasonably well by themselves. They simply considered the whole proposal a curtailing of their freedom. The Swiss were by far not the only members of the empire who refused to accept the resolutions, but Maximilian would use their refusal later as a pretext to place the Swiss Confederacy under an imperial ban (Reichsacht).

== Course of the war ==
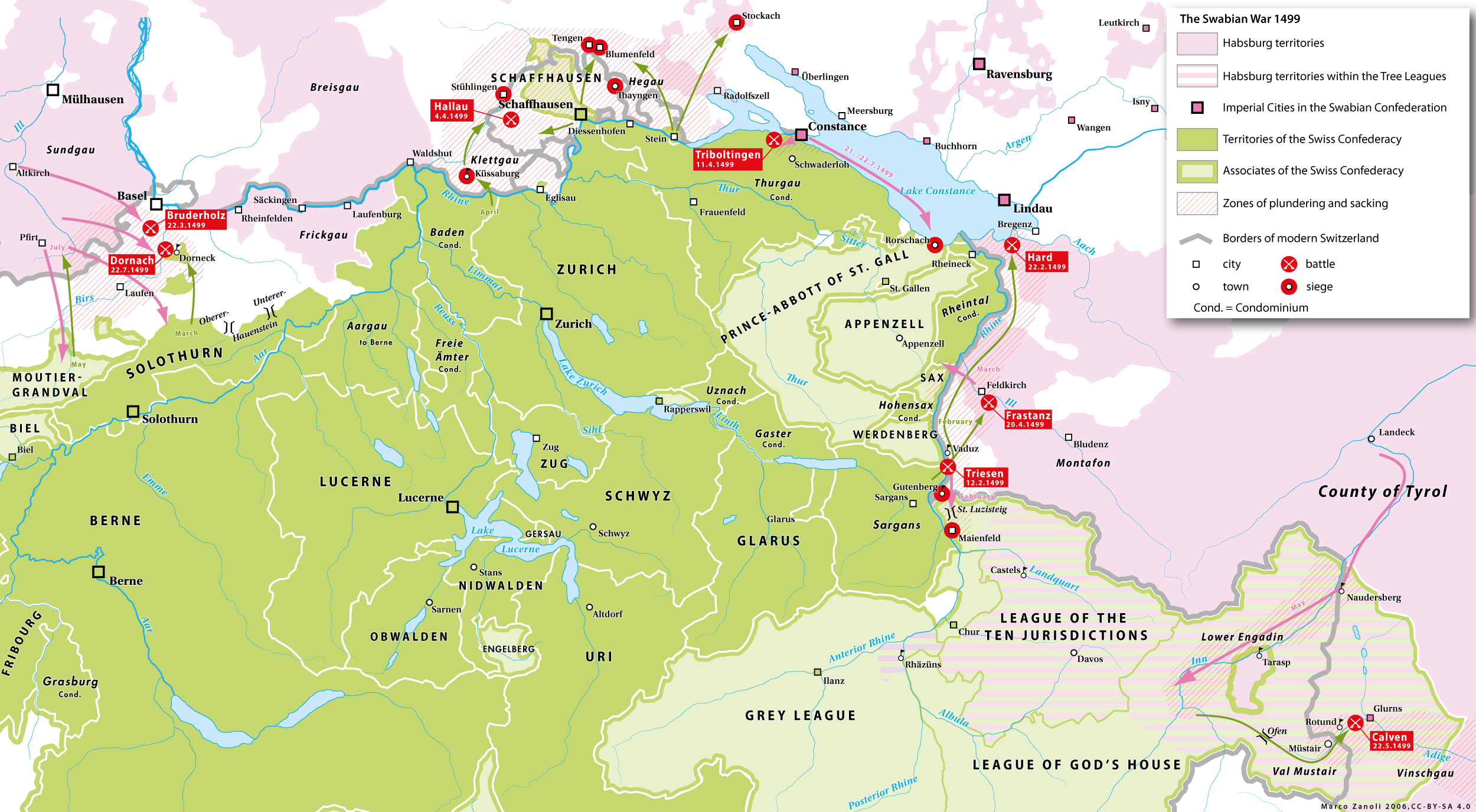
Theater of the Swabian War during 1499

Open war broke out over a territorial conflict in the Grisons, where during the 15th century a federation similar to the Eidgenossenschaft had developed. Like the Swiss, these Three Leagues had achieved a far-reaching autonomy, but also were involved in constant struggles with the Habsburgs, who ruled the neighbouring territories to the east and who kept trying to bring the Grisons under their influence. During the 1470s and 1480s, Duke Sigismund had succeeded in acquiring step by step the high justice over most of the communes of the Zehngerichtebund ("League of the Ten Jurisdictions" in the Prättigau, the youngest of the Three Leagues that had sprung up in the Grisons, having been founded only in 1436), and Maximilian continued this expansionist strategy. The Habsburg pressure prompted the Three Leagues to sign a close military alliance with the Swiss Confederacy in 1497–98.

At the same time, the Habsburgs had been involved in a major power struggle with the French kings of the House of Valois over the control of the remains of the realm of Charles the Bold, whose daughter and heiress Mary Maximilian had married. Maximilian's second marriage in 1493 with Bianca Maria Sforza from Milan then got the Habsburgs directly involved in the Italian Wars, clashing again with the French kings over the control of the Duchy of Milan.

As a direct connection between Tyrol and Milan, the Grisons and in particular the Val Müstair became strategically important to the Habsburgs. The Umbrail Pass in the Val Müstair connects the Vinschgau valley (Val Venosta) in southern Tyrol with the Valtellina in northern Italy. Furthermore, the Habsburgs and the Bishop of Chur had been quarrelling over the judicial rights over the region for some time. On January 20, 1499, Habsburg troops occupied the valley and plundered the Benedictine Convent of Saint John at Müstair, but were soon driven back by the forces of the Three Leagues, and an armistice was signed already on February 2 in Glurns (Glorenza), a village in the upper Vinschgau.

But the Three Leagues had already called upon the Swiss for help and troops from Uri had already arrived in Chur. Upon learning about the truce, they withdrew, but met a small troop of Habsburg soldiers on their way back home. When those engaged in the usual insults on the Swiss, the latter crossed the Rhine and killed the scoffers. In retaliation, Habsburg troops sacked the village of Maienfeld on February 7 and called the Swabian League for help. Only five days later, Swiss troops from several cantons had been assembled and reconquered the village and moved towards Lake Constance, pillaging and plundering along the way. On February 20, they again met a Habsburg army, which they defeated in the Battle of Hard on the shores of Lake Constance near the estuary of the Rhine, and at about the same time, other Swiss troops invaded the Hegau region between Schaffhausen and Constance. On both sites, the Swiss retreated after a few days.

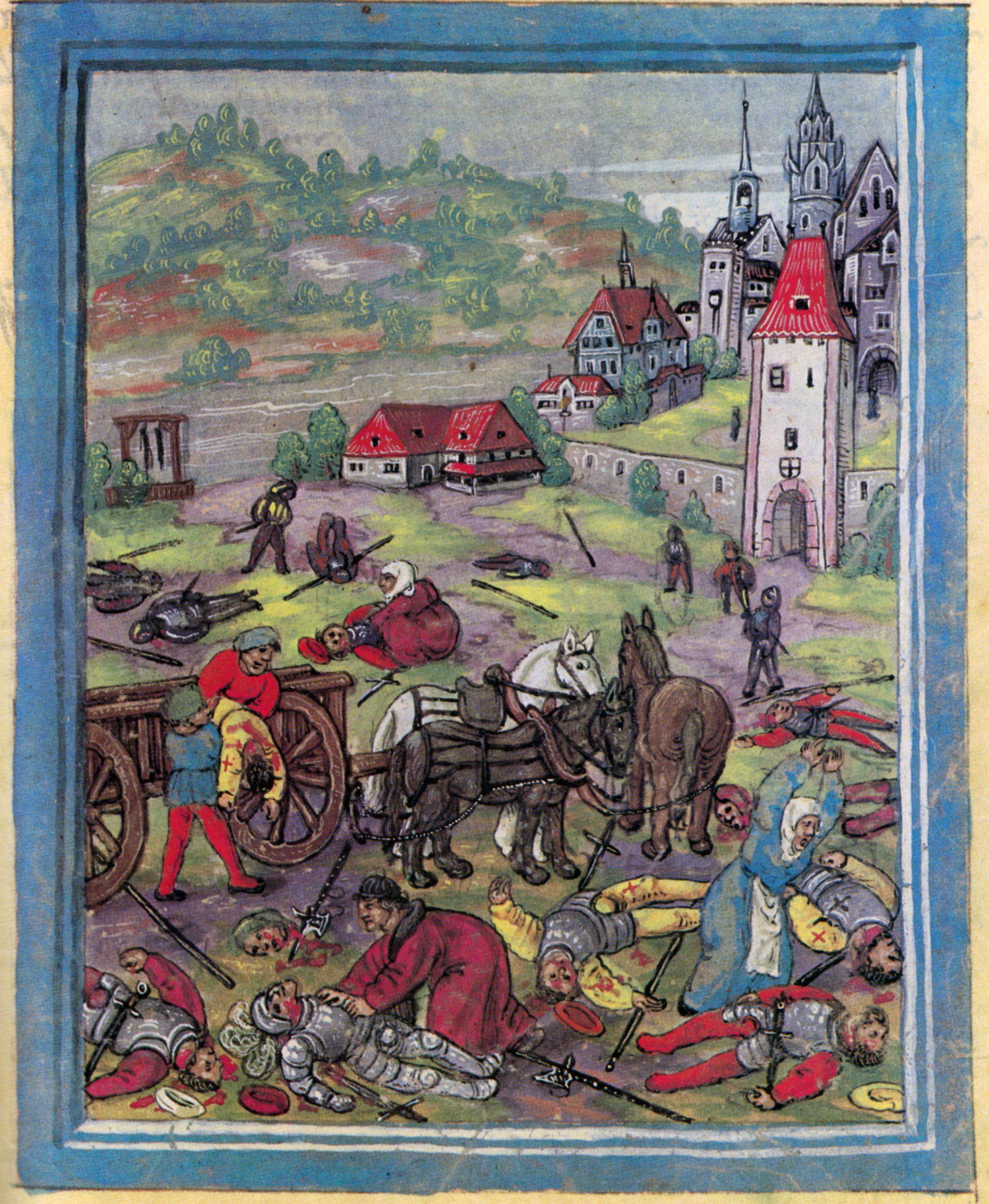
Women and priests retrieve the dead bodies of Swabian soldiers just outside the city gates of Constance after the battle of Schwaderloh. (Luzerner Schilling).

Meanwhile, the Swabian League had completed its recruitment, and undertook a raid on Dornach on March 22, but suffered a defeat against numerically inferior Swiss troops in the Battle of Bruderholz that same evening. In early April, both sides raided each other's territories along the Rhine; the Swiss conquered the villages of Hallau and Neunkirch in the Klettgau west of Schaffhausen. A larger attack of the Swabian League took place on April 11, 1499: the Swabian troops occupied and plundered some villages on the southern shore of Lake Constance, just south of Constance. The expedition ended in a shameful defeat and open flight when the Swiss soldiers, who had their main camp just a few miles south at Schwaderloh,^{[b]} arrived and met the Swabians in the Battle of Schwaderloh.^{[c]} The Swabians lost more than 1,000 soldiers; 130 from the city of Constance alone; and the Swiss captured their heavy equipment, including their artillery.

Again, the Swiss raided the Klettgau and the Hegau and pillaged several fortified smaller Swabian cities such as Tiengen or Stühlingen before retreating again. This whole war was characterized by many such smaller raids and plundering expeditions of both sides between a few larger battles. On the eastern front, a new Habsburg attack on the Rhine valley provoked a counterstrike of the Eidgenossen, who remained victorious in the Battle of Frastanz near Feldkirch on April 20, 1499.

The continued defeats of both Habsburg and Swabian armies made King Maximilian, who had hitherto been occupied in the Netherlands, travel to Constance and assume the leadership of the operations himself. He declared an imperial ban over the Swiss Confederacy in an attempt to gain wider support for the operation amongst the German princes by declaring the conflict an "imperial war". However, this move had no success. Maximilian then decided that the next decisive attack should take place again in the Val Müstair, since he didn't have enough troops near Constance to risk attacking there. An abandoned attack attempt in the west in early May 1499 had drawn significant Swiss forces there, who subsequently raided the Sundgau. On May 21, the Swiss undertook a third raid in the Hegau, but abandoned the operation one week later after the city of Stockach withstood a siege long enough for Swabian relief troops to come dangerously close.

Simultaneously, the Three Leagues attacked the Habsburg troops that camped again at Glurns on May 22, 1499, before Maximilian could arrive with reinforcements. They overran the fortifications and routed the Austrian army in the Battle of Calven and then ravaged the Vinschgau, before retreating after three days. Maximilian and his troops arrived one week later, on May 29. In revenge, his troops pillaged the Engadin valley, but retreated quickly before reinforcements from the Swiss Confederacy arrived.

The refusal of the military leaders of the Swabian League to withdraw troops from the northern front to send them to the Grisons as Maximilian had demanded made the king return to Lake Constance. The differences between the Swabians, who preferred to strike in the north, and the king, who still hoped to convince them to help him win the struggle in the Val Müstair, led to a pause in the hostilities. Troops were assembled at Constance, but an attack did not occur. Until July, nothing of significance happened along the whole front.

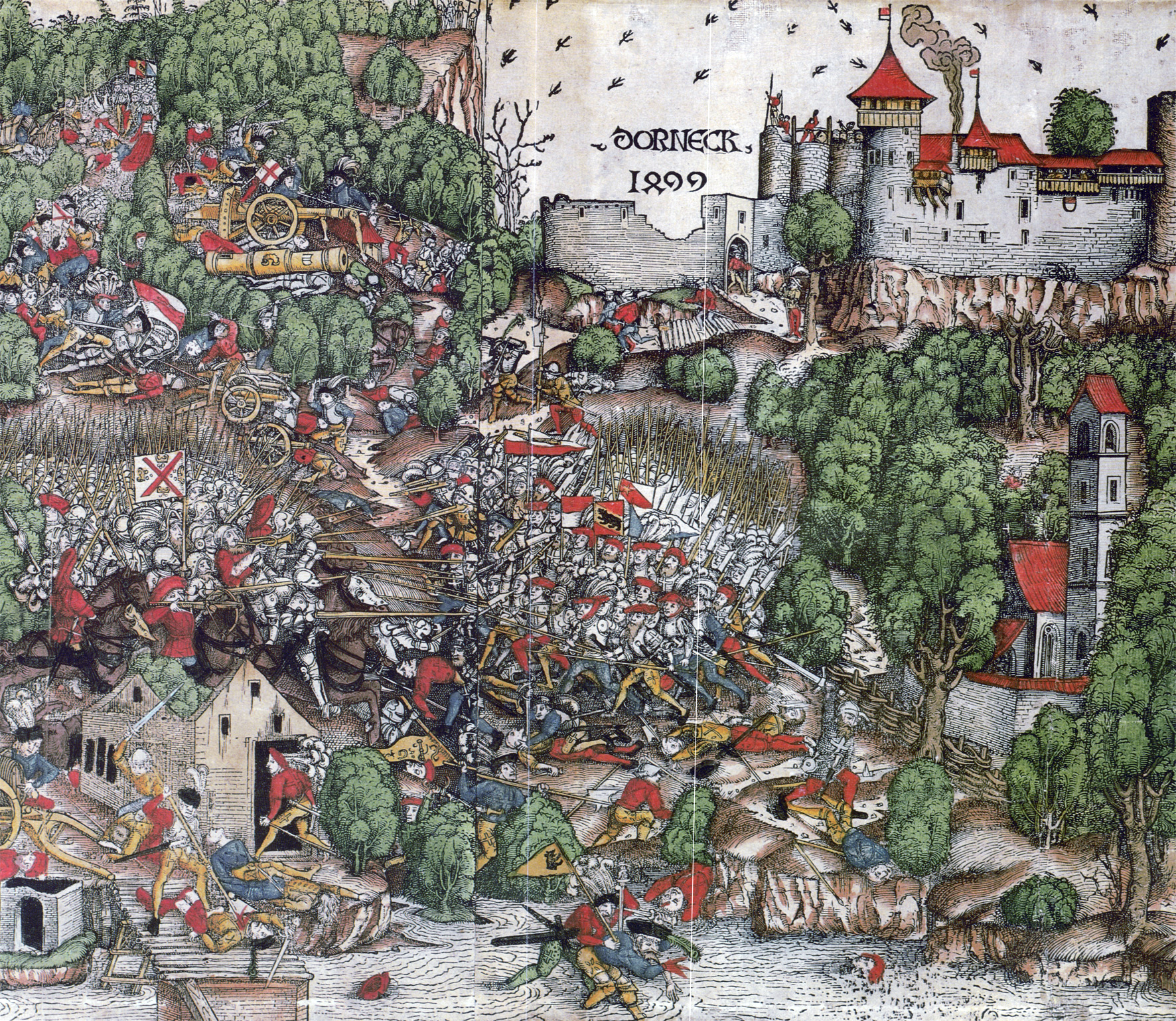
Contemporary woodcut of the Battle of Dornach showing the castle of Dorneck, the main battle and the slaughter of the fleeing troops by the Swiss at the river Birs

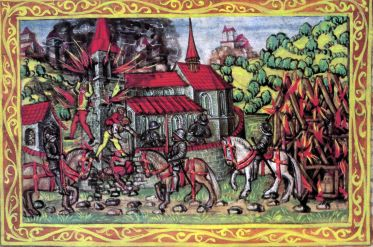
The fortified tower of the church of Thayngen is blown up by the Swabian knights. The defenders jump for their lives, while the village goes up in flames. (Luzerner Schilling).

By mid-July, Maximilian and the Swabian leaders suddenly were under pressure from their own troops. In the west, where there lay an army under the command of Count Heinrich von Fürstenberg, a large contingent of mercenaries from Flanders and many knights threatened to leave as they had not received their pay. The foot soldiers of the Swabian troops also complained: most of them were peasants and preferred to go home and bring in the harvest. Maximilian was forced to act.

An attack by sea across Lake Constance on Rheineck and Rorschach on July 21 was one of the few successful Swabian operations. The small Swiss detachment was taken by surprise, the villages plundered and burnt. A much larger attack of an army of about 16,000 soldiers in the west on Dornach, however, met a quickly assembled but strong Swiss army. In the Battle of Dornach on July 22, 1499, the Swabian and mercenary troops suffered a heavy defeat after a long and hard battle. Their general Heinrich von Fürstenberg fell early in the fight, about 3,000 Swabian and 500 Swiss soldiers died, and the Swabians lost all of their artillery again.

One of the last skirmishes of the war took place on July 25. A Swabian army marched from the Hegau on Schaffhausen, but met with fierce defense at Thayngen. Although the small force of defenders was finally overcome, and the village was pillaged, the defenders inflicted heavy casualties and the attack was held up long enough for the Swiss to send troops from Schaffhausen to meet the Swabians in the field. Misunderstandings between the Swabian knights and their foot soldiers made the Swabians retreat, and nightfall then prevented a larger battle.^{[d]}

A major problem for the Swiss was the lack of any unified command. The cantonal contingents only took orders from their own leaders. Complaints of insubordination were common. The Swiss Diet had to adopt this resolution on 11 March 1499: "Every canton shall impress upon its soldiers that when the Confederates are under arms together, each one of them, whatever his canton, shall obey the officers of the others."

The war was paid for largely by the French and Italian allies of the Swiss as well as by ransoming prisoners of war.

== Peace negotiations ==
Early mediation attempts in March 1499 had failed because of mutual distrust between the parties. But after the Battle of Dornach, the Swabian League was war-weary and had lost all confidence in the king's abilities as a military leader, and thus refused Maximilian's demands to muster a new army. The Swabian and Habsburg armies had suffered far higher human losses than the Swiss, and were also short on artillery, after repeatedly having lost their equipment to the Swiss. The Swiss also had no desire to prolong the war further, though they refused a first peace proposal that Maximilian presented at Schaffhausen in August 1499.

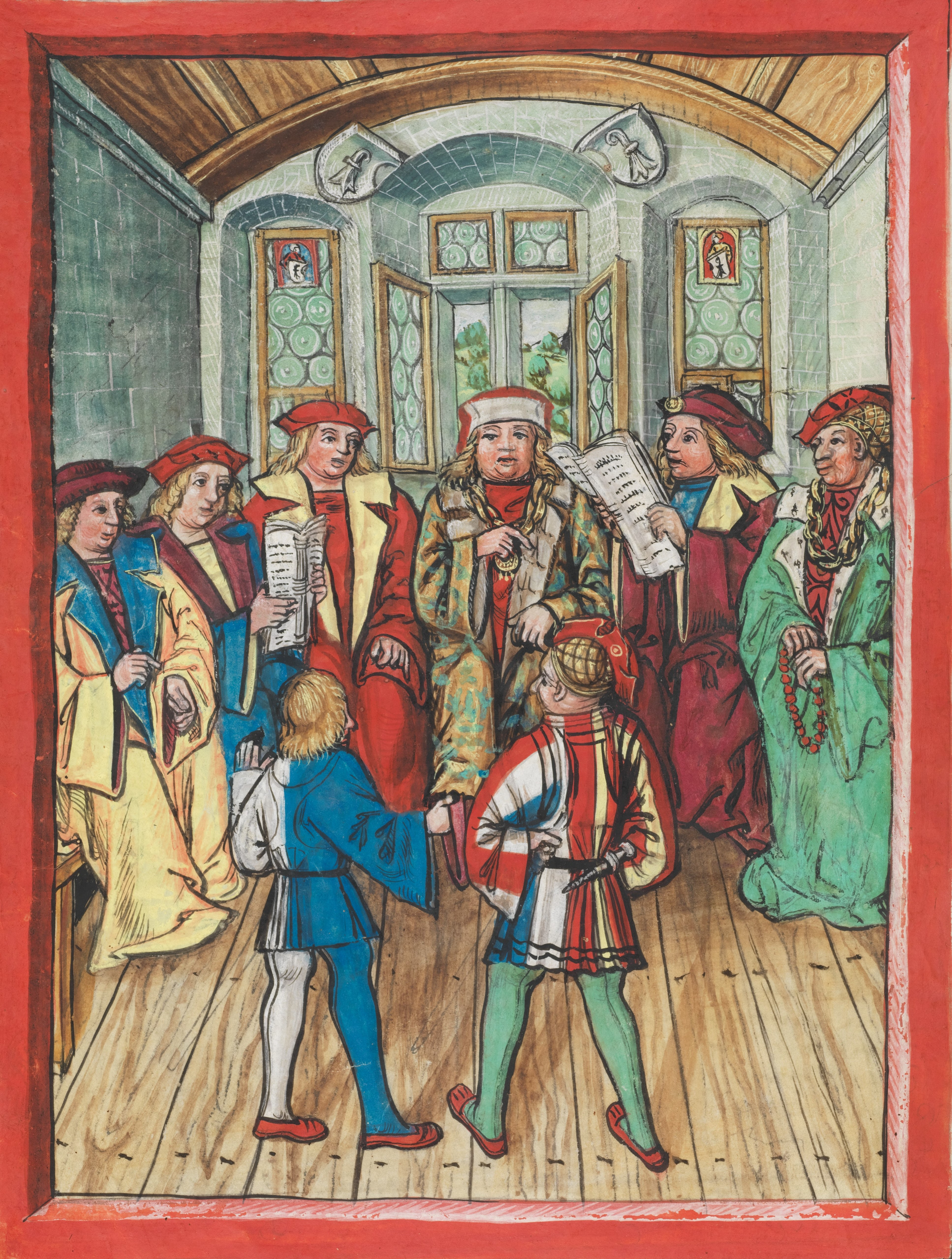
The Milanese envoy presents his peace proposals to Maximilian's delegation at the city hall of Basel. A delegate from Lucerne (front left, in the blue-white dress) translates. (Luzerner Schilling).

However, events in the Italian Wars helped bring the Swabian War to an end. King Louis XII of France tried to bring the Duchy of Milan under his control. As long as the Swabian War continued, the Milanese ruler Ludovico il Moro—whose niece Bianca Maximilian had married in 1493—could not expect help from either Swiss mercenaries or Maximilian, and thus his envoy Galeazzo Visconti tried to mediate between the Swiss and the king. The French delegation at the Tagsatzung (Swiss federal diet and war council) tried to prevent any agreement for the same reason. The Milanese delegation prevailed in these intrigues and persuaded both sides to moderate their demands.

Finally, Maximilian and the Swiss signed the Peace of Basel (1499) on September 22. Maximilian had tried to make the conflict an "imperial war" by declaring a ban over the Confederacy. But the peace treaty carefully downplayed that claim, instead treating the war as what it actually was: a war between two equal members of the empire (Imperial estate, or Reichsstände), namely the House of Habsburg and the Swiss Confederacy. The document referred to Maximilian only as "duke of Habsburg", not as "king of the Germans" or even "Holy Roman Emperor".

With the Peace of Basel, the relations between the Old Swiss Confederacy and the empire returned to the status quo ante bellum from before the Diet of Worms in 1495. The imperial ban was dropped silently. Maximilian had to accept the independence of the cantons and to abandon implicitly the Habsburg claims on their territories. Consequently, the then ten members of the Swiss Confederacy remained exempt from the jurisdiction of the Reichskammergericht. The Swiss henceforth also exercised high justice over the Thurgau. The war had not caused any territorial changes, except in the area around Schaffhausen, where the city had asserted its hegemony over some places that had formerly belonged to the Bishop of Constance.

In the Grisons, the situation also reverted to pre-war conditions. The Habsburg kept their rights over eight of the communes of the League of the Ten Jurisdictions, but also had to accept that league's alliance in the Three Leagues and with the Swiss Confederacy. Ultimately, this arrangement would lead to the Habsburgs losing the Prättigau to the Three Leagues, with the exception of a temporary re-occupation during the Thirty Years' War nearly 130 years later.

== Further consequences ==
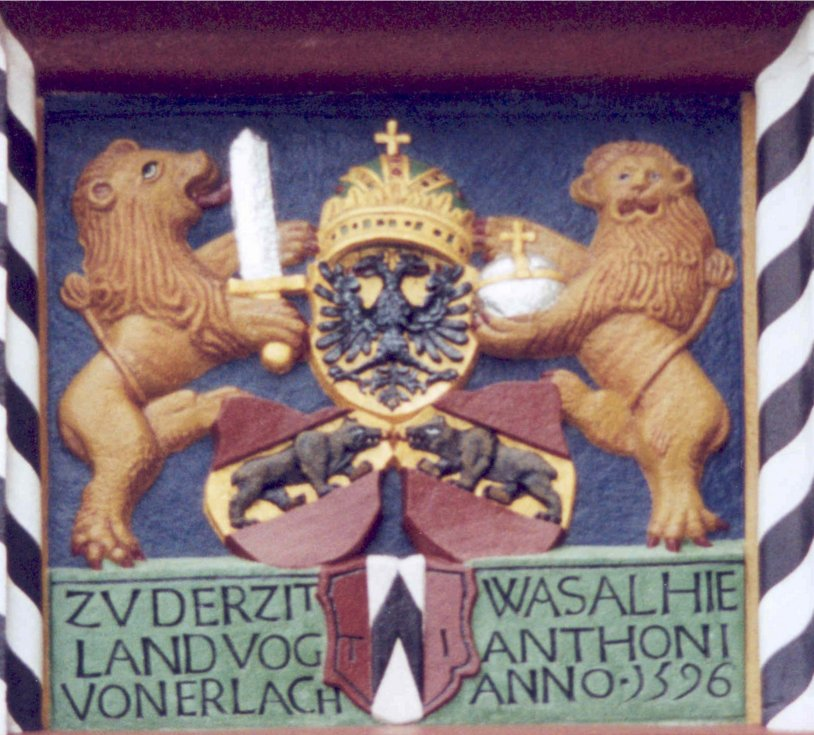
The Swiss Confederacy formally remained a part of the Holy Roman Empire, as shown by this stack of crests from 1596 on the main gate of castle Lenzburg: the Imperial eagle of the Holy Roman Empire tops the bears of Bern. At the bottom, the coat of arms of the von Erlach family. After 1648, the practice of placing the imperial insignia atop the confederate emblems was gradually abandoned and used less and less frequently and mainly for traditional reasons until the early 18th century.

Basel had remained studiously neutral throughout the whole war. Although allied with some cantons of the Swiss Confederacy, it also had strong economic ties in the Alsace and further down along the Rhine. But the events of the war had strengthened the pro-confederate party in the city council, and the Swiss recognized the city's strategic position as a bridgehead on the Rhine (like Schaffhausen, too). On June 9, 1501, a delegation from Basel and the Swiss cantons' representatives signed the alliance contract, which the city council of Basel ratified on July 13, 1501.

Schaffhausen had fought alongside the Eidgenossen during the Swabian War, and thus its acceptance into the Confederacy was a mere formality. The city had been an imperial city since 1415 and an associate state of the Confederacy since 1454 through a 25-year contract that had been renewed in 1479. On August 10, 1501, it became the twelfth member of the Confederacy.

With the end of the war, the Swiss troops were no longer bound along the Rhine and in the Grisons. The cantons concluded new mercenary contracts, so called capitulations, with the Duchy of Milan and soon got deeply involved in the Italian Wars, where Swiss mercenaries ended up fighting on both sides. The involvement of the Old Swiss Confederacy, acting in its own interests in these wars, was brought to an end by the defeat against French forces in the battle of Marignano in 1515 and a subsequent peace treaty with the French king in 1516, the so-called Eternal Peace. However, Swiss mercenaries from individual cantons of the federation continued to participate in the Italian Wars well beyond (until the middle of the 16th century) in the service of various parties and, following that peace with France, in particular in the service of the French king.

The Swiss Confederacy remained an independent Reichsstand of the Holy Roman Empire, but as it was not even obliged to participate in the Imperial Diet, this relation was degraded to a purely formal one that would lose significance throughout the 16th century. However, the Swiss still considered themselves as members of the empire with the status of imperial immediacy; the empire was still considered the foundation of all privileges, rights, or political identity as can be witnessed in the continued use of the imperial insignia. The relations between the Habsburgs and the Confederacy were fully normalized in the Erbeinung of 1511, a renewal of the earlier Ewige Richtung of 1474 and a first Erbeinung of 1477. In that treaty, the Habsburgs finally and officially gave up all their territorial claims of old, and even designated the Confederacy the protecting power of the County of Burgundy. In the Treaty of Westphalia of 1648, all members and associate states of the Confederacy would gain official full exemption from the empire and recognition as a national and political entity in their own right.

== See also ==
- Battles of the Old Swiss Confederacy

== Notes ==
- ^{a} Kuhschweizer roughly means literally "Swiss cow herders"; although intended as a derogatory term, there is no connection to "coward". One explanation for the violent response of the Swiss to that and related "cow"-based insults is that these alluded to sodomy and thus heresy. Incidentally, the Swabians also used the term Schwyzer to denote all the Swiss, who called themselves Eidgenossen at the time, as an insult. The Swiss, however, assimilated that term and began to wear it proudly. See also Schwyz.
- ^{b} The name is sometimes given as "Schwaderloo" or even "Schwaderloch".
- ^{c} The battle of Schwaderloh actually took place near Triboltingen.
- ^{d} Götz von Berlichingen participated as a young knight in this operation and described the event in some detail in his memoirs. Willibald Pirckheimer, another eye-witness, also gave an extended description.
