= Rappenkrieg (Basel) =

1591–1594 peasant uprising in Switzerland

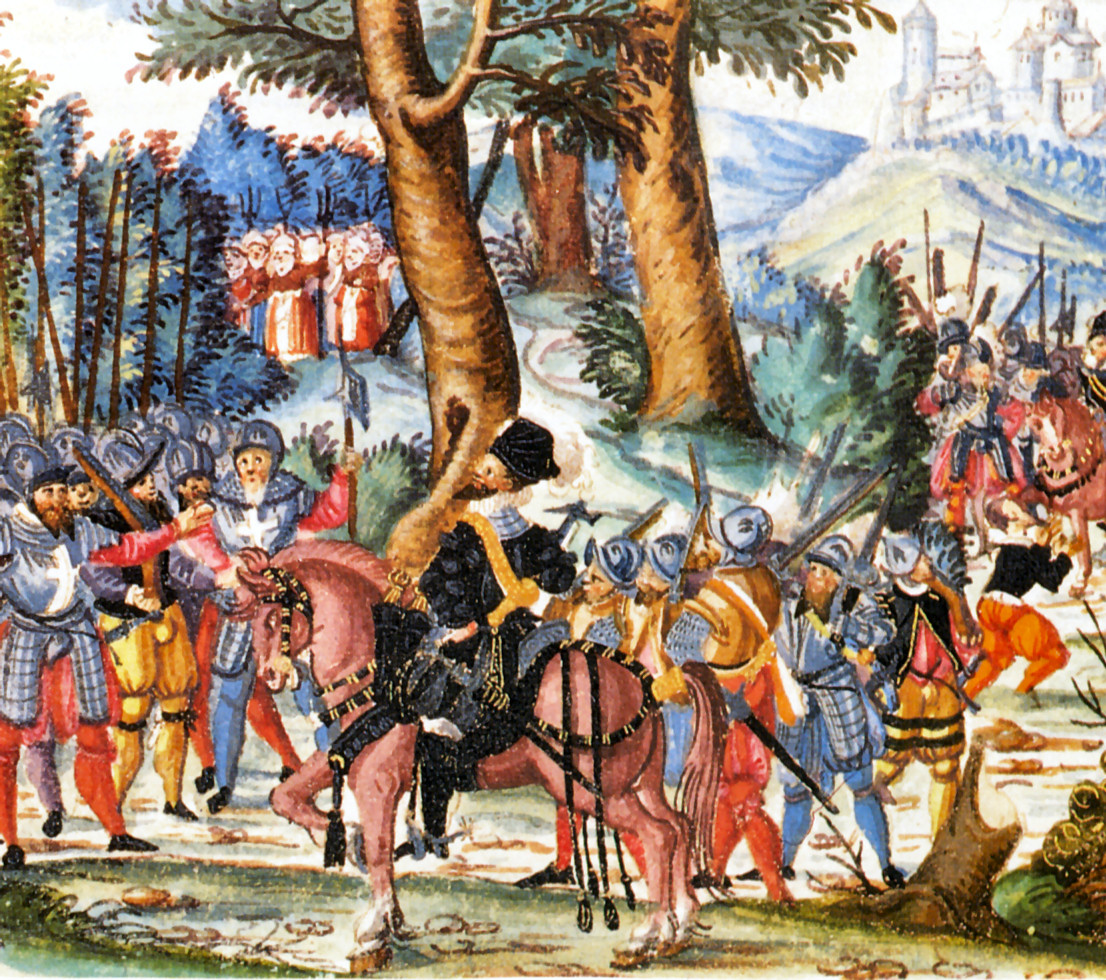
Andreas Ryff and the peasants beside Wildenstein Castle in May 1594

The Rappenkrieg was a peasant uprising lasting from 1591–1594, involving a conflict between the Swiss city of Basel and the surrounding Prince-Bishopric of Basel. The uprising was caused by the increase in the rate of sales tax on wine and meat. After several years the conflict was ended through negotiations headed up by the Basel merchant turned politician Andreas Ryff.

The name "Rappenkrieg" comes from the local word, Rappen, then as now the term for a low value coin: "Rappenkrieg" can be loosely translated as the "Pence/Cents War".

The Basel Rappenkrieg is not to be confused with the Rappenkrieg in Western Austria from 1612 to 1614 in the adjacent Fricktal and the Rhine, although both had similar causes.

== Origins ==
The economic backdrop was furnished by agricultural prices which had risen to record high levels as a result of population increase, the splitting of small holdings on inheritance, and resulting shortage of land. This was occurring in the context of a succession of poor harvests attributed by some historians to a "Little Ice Age".

The political context from the second half of the sixteenth century included a sustained increase in religious tensions as protestantism grew in popularity among the citizenry in this part of the Swiss Confederation, while the Roman Catholic Prince-Bishops of Basel, galvanized into an increasingly active fight-back by the Counter-Reformation, lost respect and influence.

In 1575 Jakob Christoph Blarer von Wartensee, the newly-appointed Prince-Bishop of Basel, committed himself to the recatholicisation of the entire region, and in 1579 he secured alliances with the principal catholic towns and territories locally. His relationship with the Swiss city of Basel was now polarised along religious lines. The city found itself increasingly isolated among its more religiously conservative Swiss confederate neighbours, and was obliged to agree to the 1585 Baden Agreement, a principal feature of which was the requirement to make prince-bishop an enormous payment of 200,000 Guilders. The Baden Agreement was seen at the time as a major victory for the counter-reformation.

== Fighting breaks out ==
In order to raise the necessary money, the city decided to increase taxes on wine and meat with effect from January 1591. Already under growing economic pressure, the farmers protested against this major tax increase, but the city rejected their protest and marked out their representatives as potential troublemakers. Relations deteriorated and the protests degenerated into an insurrection. A notable spokesman for the farmers was a protestant from Liestal called Osimus Battmann, who was singled out for blame by the city government. Battmann was arrested for a second time in September 1593 and subjected to intensive questioning which may have amounted to torture.

== Escalation and resolution ==
The city fathers maintained a hard line against the insurgency. Other measures were taken including a decree forbidding inn keepings from plying their trade. The conflict became more militarised when the insurgents tried to prevent implementation of the decree by force. Fifty soldiers were sent to Liestal on 13 May 1594 under the command of Captain Andreas Ryff to put down the insurrection. Two days later, an unsuccessful attempt was made to arrest Hans Siegrist from Niederdorf, one of the movement's leaders. This escalated the affair and the angry farmers responded by taking up their arms and gathering on the beside to the castle at Wildenstein. For his part Ryff, now with a force of 170 men, confronted the rebels. It now turned out that Ryff was willing to use a diplomatic combination of sympathy and menace on behalf of the city in order to try and avert the threat of a wider civil war. There followed several days of uncertainty and negotiation between Siegrist and Ryff until eventually Ryff managed to persuade his compatriots that a tax increase was necessary.

The compromise agreed involved restricting the tax increase on wine to three times its pre-crisis level. The insurgents were spared punishment and it was agreed that they would not be fined for the expenses which their protest had imposed on the city.

== See also ==
- Battles of the Old Swiss Confederacy

== Sources ==
- Andreas Ryff: Der Rappenkrieg. Anfang, Mittel und End. Alles von dem Ehren und Nothvesten Herrn Hauptmann Andreas Ryff ganz wahrhaftig und ordentlich beschrieben. Basel, Nik. Müller 1833
