= Battle of Schwaderloh =

- Part of the Swabian War
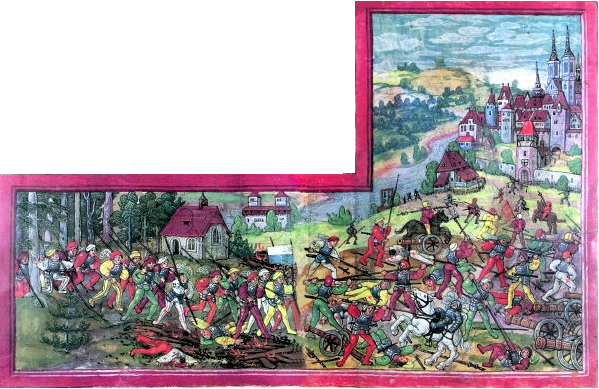
- Depiction of the battle from the Chronicles of Lucerne (1511 – 1513). The Swiss arrive on the left; the battle itself is shown on the bottom right, and the top right shows the flight of the Swabian soldiers to Constance.
Date	11 April 1499
Location	Triboltingen, Thurgau, Switzerland
Result	Swiss victory

Belligerents
Old Swiss Confederacy	Swabian League, fighting for Emperor Maximilian I of the Holy Roman Empire

Commanders and leaders
Rudolf Hass, Oswald von Ross, Stoffel Suter	Count Wolfgang von Fürstenberg

Strength
c. 1,400 – 1,800 infantry hundreds of cavalry Total: 1,400–1,800+	c. 4,500 – 6,000 infantry c. 400 – 600 cavalry Total: 4,900–6,600

Casualties and losses
c. 100 – 500 dead	c. 1,400 – 2,000 dead

The Battle of Schwaderloh took place on 11 April 1499 near Triboltingen, a village on the Swiss shores of the Untersee just south of Constance. It was one of the major battles of the Swabian War between the Old Swiss Confederacy and the forces of the Swabian League and of Emperor Maximilian I.

The Swabians had assembled a large army at Constance in April 1499. Constance, situated on the north shore of the river Rhine, was an ideal gateway for expeditions into Swiss territories of the Thurgau south of Lake Constance. The Swiss had prepared for an attack and set up their main camp at Schwaderloh, a small village only a few kilometers south of Constance, and had garrisoned the villages on the southern shores of the lake. Already in the weeks before the battle, minor skirmishes had taken place, and the Swabian cannons on the island Reichenau had laid fire on the village of Ermatingen.

In the early morning of 11 April 1499, a large Swabian army of about 4,500 to 6,000 foot soldiers and some 400 to 600 knights under the command of Count Wolfgang von Fürstenberg poured forth from the city gates of Constance. They crossed the river and drove back the small Swiss garrisons in the villages of Ermatingen, Mannenbach, and Triboltingen. They captured two cannons at Ermatingen, which had been sent by the city of Lucerne to answer the fire from Reichenau. Seeing the Swiss retreat, the troops turned to looting and burning the villages, and began already to transport back their bounty to Constance. Attempts of the Swabian commanders to maintain battle order were ignored by the soldiers.

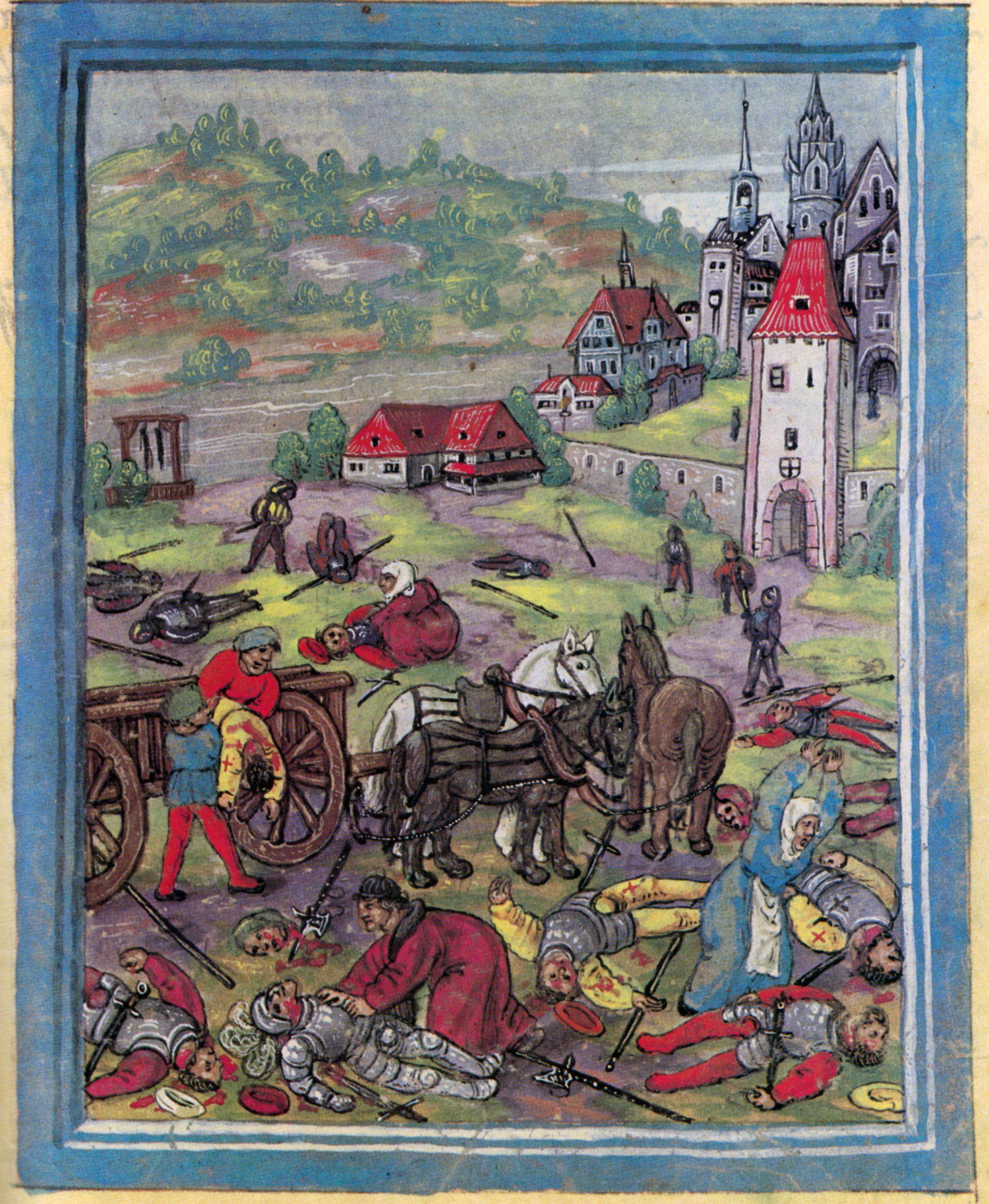
Women and priests retrieve the dead bodies of Swabian soldiers just outside the city gates of Constance after the Battle of Schwaderloh. (Luzerner Schilling)

The Swiss troops retreated through the woods to Schwaderloh, where the main contingent of the Swiss camped. They quickly assembled their forces and marched with some 1,400 to 1,800 men to Triboltingen. Between Triboltingen and Gottlieben, they attacked the disorganized Swabians and took them by surprise. The mostly inexperienced Swabian footsoldiers took to flight immediately. Only the knights withstood them for some time and managed to fire some cannon shots; when smoke obscured the view the Swiss were able to engage in close combat and routed them. The Swiss had divided their forces into two at this point—the pikemen continuing to fight the Swabian knights, while the halberdiers and other troops pursued the routing Swabian foot soldiers. The Swabians fled the battlefield in disarray, leaving behind not only their bounty but also all of their artillery, including the two cannons they had captured in the morning at Ermatingen. Many tried to flee by swimming across the lake, leaving behind their weapons and armor. At least 80 soldiers drowned in the lake, many others died in the swamplands between Gottlieben and Constance. Contemporary sources report that many Swabian soldiers fled in panic as far away as Überlingen and Radolfzell. The Swiss pursued them until the city gates of Constance; and they took no prisoners: any wounded soldiers left on the battlefield were killed.
