= Perpetual Accord =

1474 treaty between the Swiss Confederacy and Austria

The Perpetual Accord ( in German 'Ewige Richtung') was a peace treaty and alliance of the eight Cantons of the Old Swiss Confederacy and Archduke Sigismund of Austria, aimed against Charles the Bold, Duke of Burgundy. King Louis XI of France was elected as a mediator between both parties. Negotiations first took place in 1472 in Constance.

As with many early matters of the Old Swiss Confederacy, the treaty was not signed with all 8 cantons and the other party at once, but in stages. In 1474 Sigismund signed it with the Confederacy, in 1478 with the Forest Cantons (Uri, Schwyz and Unterwalden) The first version was finalized on 30 March 1474, but had to wait until early 1475 for the ratification of the final version.
