= Battle of Frastanz =

Battle during the Swabian War

- Part of the Swabian War
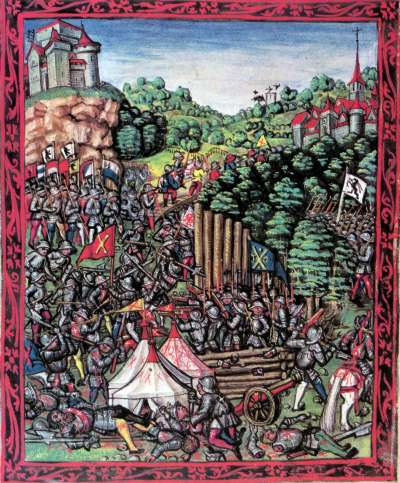
- Depiction of the battle from the Luzerner Schilling, 1513.
Date	20 April 1499
Location	Frastanz, Vorarlberg, today in Austria 47°13′12″N 09°37′12″E
Result	Swiss victory

Belligerents
Old Swiss Confederacy The Three Leagues of the Grisons	Forces of king Maximilian I of the Holy Roman Empire

Commanders and leaders
(Old Swiss Confederacy) Heinrich Wolleb † (Old Swiss Confederacy) Ulrich (IX) von Sax	(Holy Roman Empire) Burkhard von Knörringen (Holy Roman Empire) Johann von Königsegg

Strength
c. 9,000 infantry	c. 8,000 knights and Landsknechte at Frastanz, c. 1,500 Tyrolian soldiers on the Roya mountain Total: 9,500

Casualties and losses
c. 10 dead; c. 60 wounded	c. 2 – 3,000 dead
- Location within Switzerland Battle of Frastanz (Austria) Battle of Frastanz (Europe)

The Battle of Frastanz between an army of the Old Swiss Confederacy and the troops of King Maximilian I of the Holy Roman Empire took place on 20 April 1499. In one of the many raids of the Swabian War, an expedition of Habsburg troops had plundered some villages in the Swiss Confederacy, who responded by sending an army to Vorarlberg. At Frastanz, a few kilometers south-east of Feldkirch, the Habsburg troops had blocked the entry to the Montafon valley with a strong wooden fortification called a Letzi. The Swiss used a flanking maneuver to bypass the Letzi and after a hard battle routed Maximilian's army. Many Landsknechte drowned in the river Ill.

== The battle ==
Because a frontal assault on the strong fortifications at Frastanz seemed futile, the commander of the Swiss troops, Heinrich Wolleb from Uri, devised an alternate battle plan. Some 2,000 men were to cross the Roya mountain, clear it from Tyrolean troops, and then attack the main camp of the Habsburg army from the side. Another 5,000 men under the command of Count Ulrich von Sax were to advance at the foot of the mountain and then meet the first group, also attacking from the mountain above and behind the Letzi. Some 1,600 men from the Grisons would stay put to keep the garrison at Feldkirch at bay.

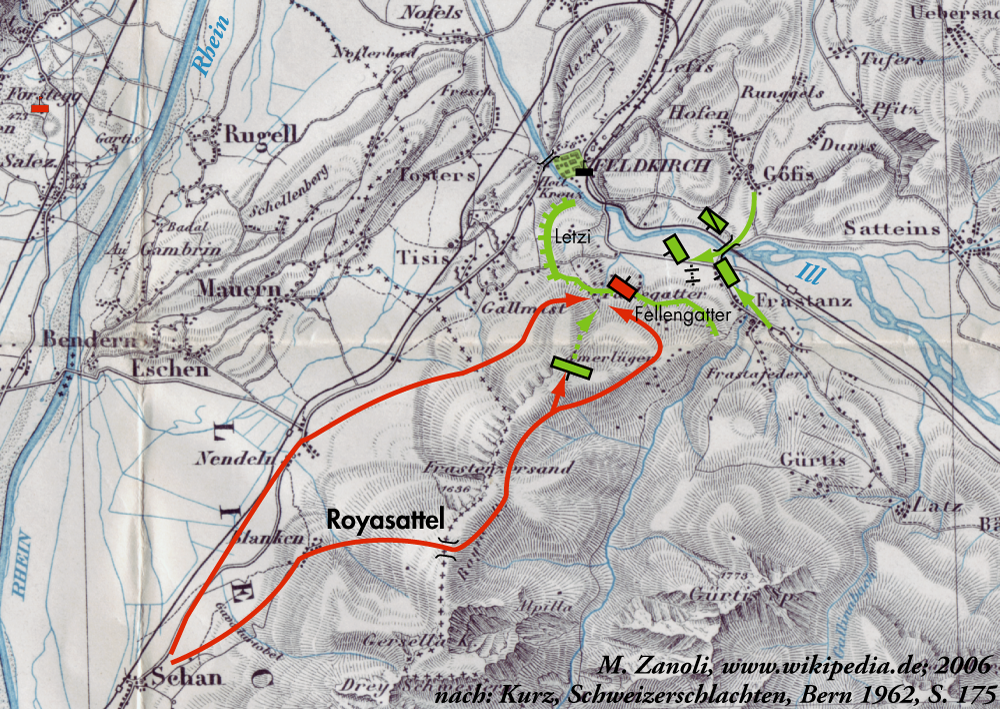
Situation of the battle of Frastanz. Red shows the route of the Swiss; green are the Habsburg troops.

Wolleb's troop was quickly engaged by the Tyrolean soldiers, but managed to drive them down the mountain. At a place called Fellengatter, they met again with the other part of the Swiss army. The Habsburg troops, amongst them many Landsknechte of the Swabian League, attacked them, but when the Swiss charged from their higher ground, the Swabian battle line collapsed. Accounts vary; some claim the fight was long and hard, others mention that the Swiss overran the Landsknechte. Heinrich Wolleb fell by a gun bullet. The Swiss ultimately drove the Habsburg soldiers back. On their flight, many drowned in the river Ill, which ran high due to the snowmelt in spring.

The Swiss camped three days at the battlefield and plundered and burned the villages in the area.
