= Luzerner Schilling =

1513 illuminated manuscript on the history of Switzerland

The Luzerner Schilling (or Luzernerchronik, Lucerne chronicle) is an illuminated manuscript of 1513, containing the chronicle of the history of Switzerland written by Diebold Schilling the Younger of Lucerne.

The chronicle is an impressive volume containing 443 colourful full-page miniature illustrations and 237 text pages, which cover the whole history of the Confederation, but with more space given to events of the previous forty years.

Diebold, through his father and his uncle Diebold Schilling the Elder, came into contact with the art of chronicle book illustration as it had evolved in Alsace under the influence of Burgundy, in works like the Froissart of Louis of Gruuthuse (BnF Fr 2643-6). Both the illustrations and the accompanying narratives are remarkably lively and realistic. Two painters can be distinguished, one keeping in the more traditional gothic style of manuscript illumination—this is believed to be Schilling himself—while the other develops a new, specifically Swiss artistic style that culminates in the works of Niklaus Manuel Deutsch and Hans Holbein the Younger in the mid-16th century.

A reproduction was published in 1932 on the occasion of the 600th anniversary of the accession of Lucerne to the Swiss Confederacy, and a full colour facsimile by the Faksimile Verlag of Lucerne in 1981.

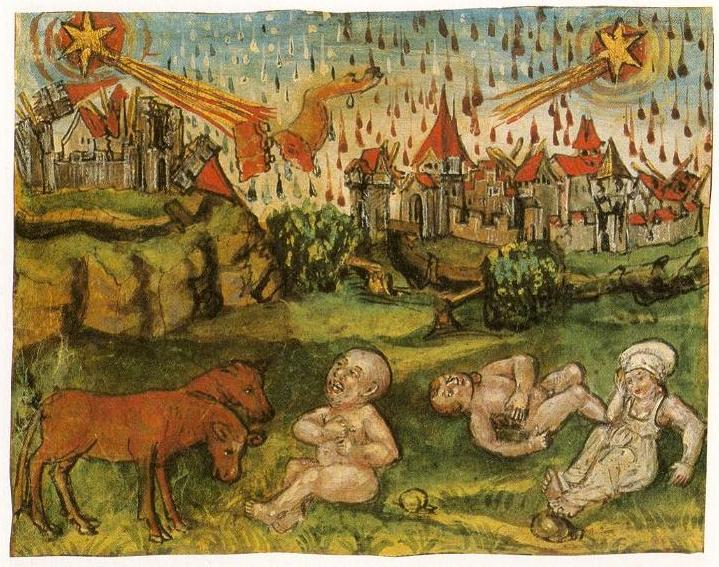
fol. 61v; disasters in connection with two comets sighted in 1456

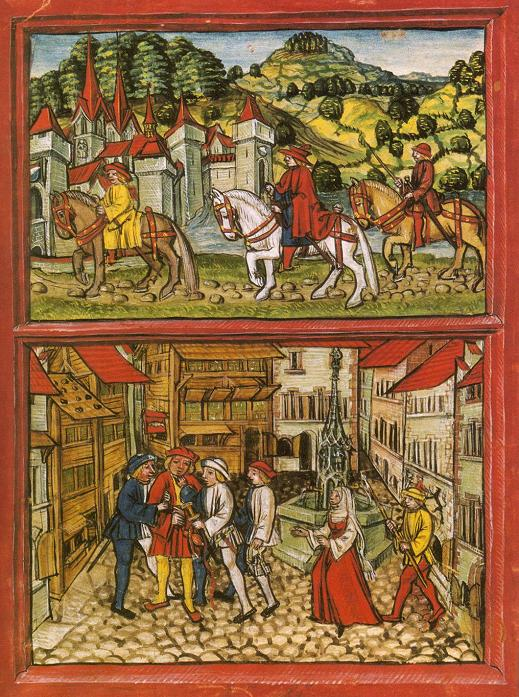
fol. 206r; Gian Maria Sforza of Milano, bishop of Genoa, travels to Zurich to hire mercenaries; Jörg Supersaxo, a traitor bribed by the Milanese, is arrested at the fish market of Lucerne.

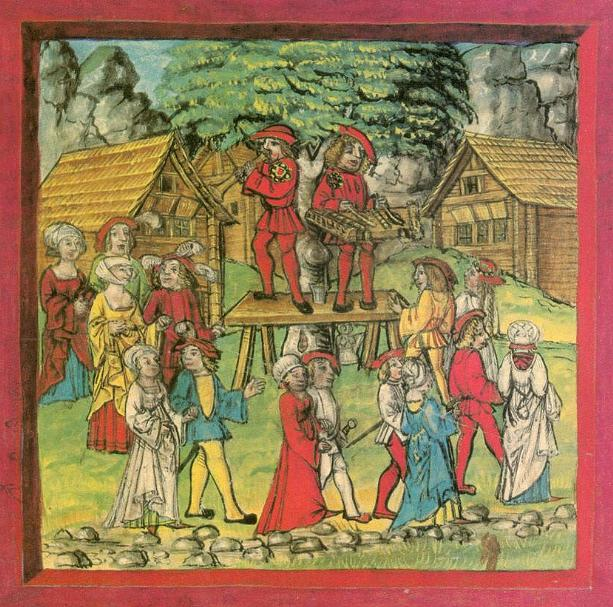
fol. 259r; Carnival dance on the Landmatte of Schwyz

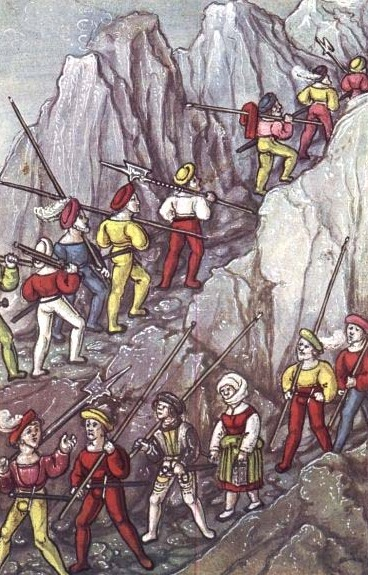
fol. 327v; Swiss mercenaries crossing the Alps

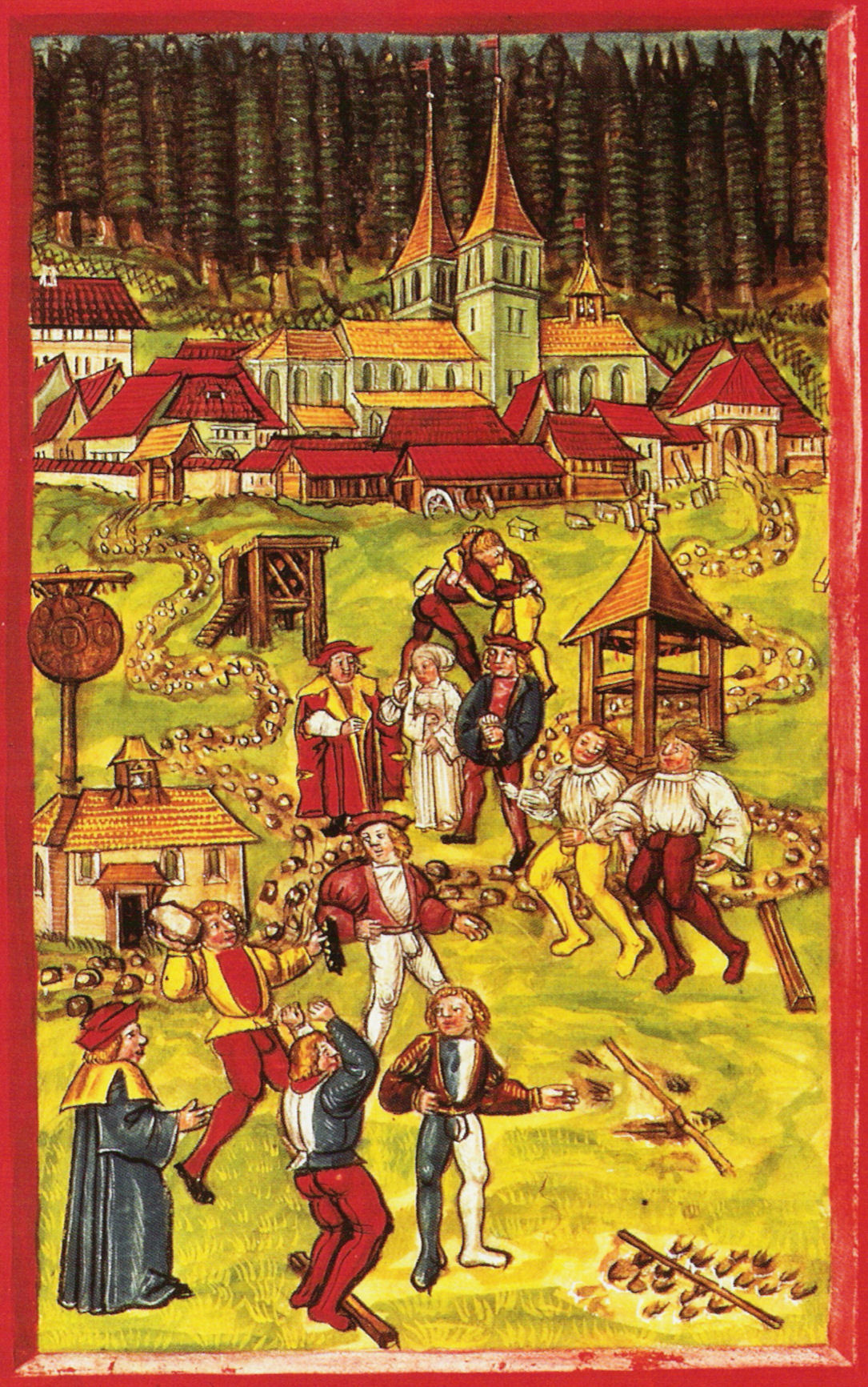
Schilling mercenaries training.

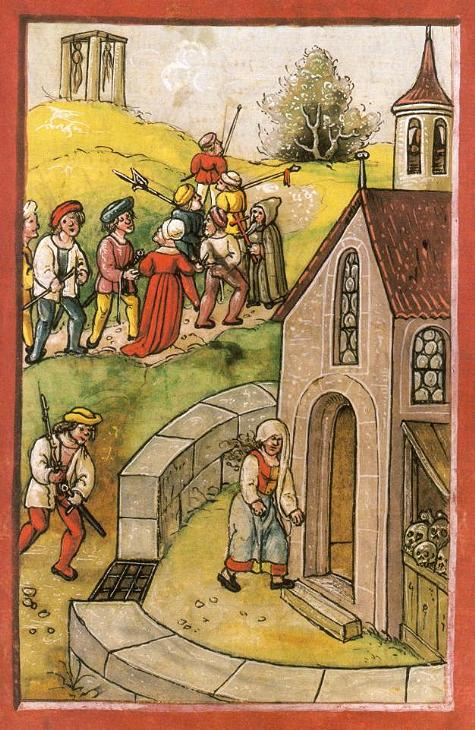
fol. 339v; the duchess of Monfort frees a condemned prisoner on his way to the gallows

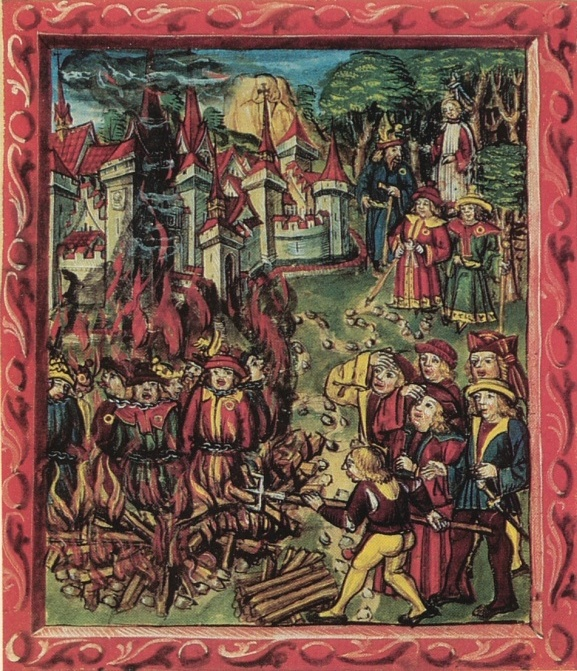
Jews (identified by the mandatory Jewish badge and Jewish hat) being burned during the Black Death in 1348

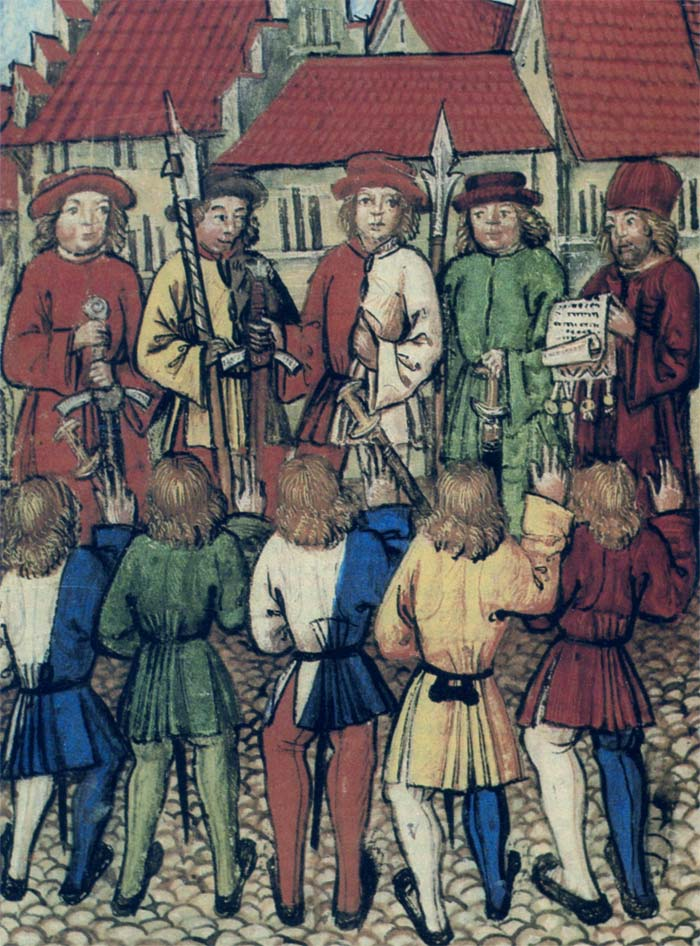
Zürich joins the Swiss Confederacy in 1351

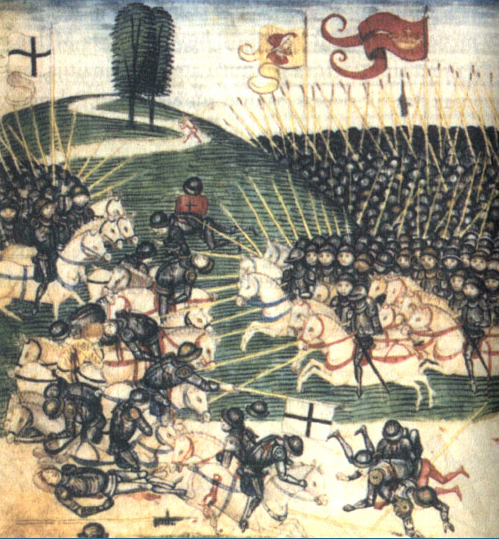
Battle of Grunwald (15 July 1410)

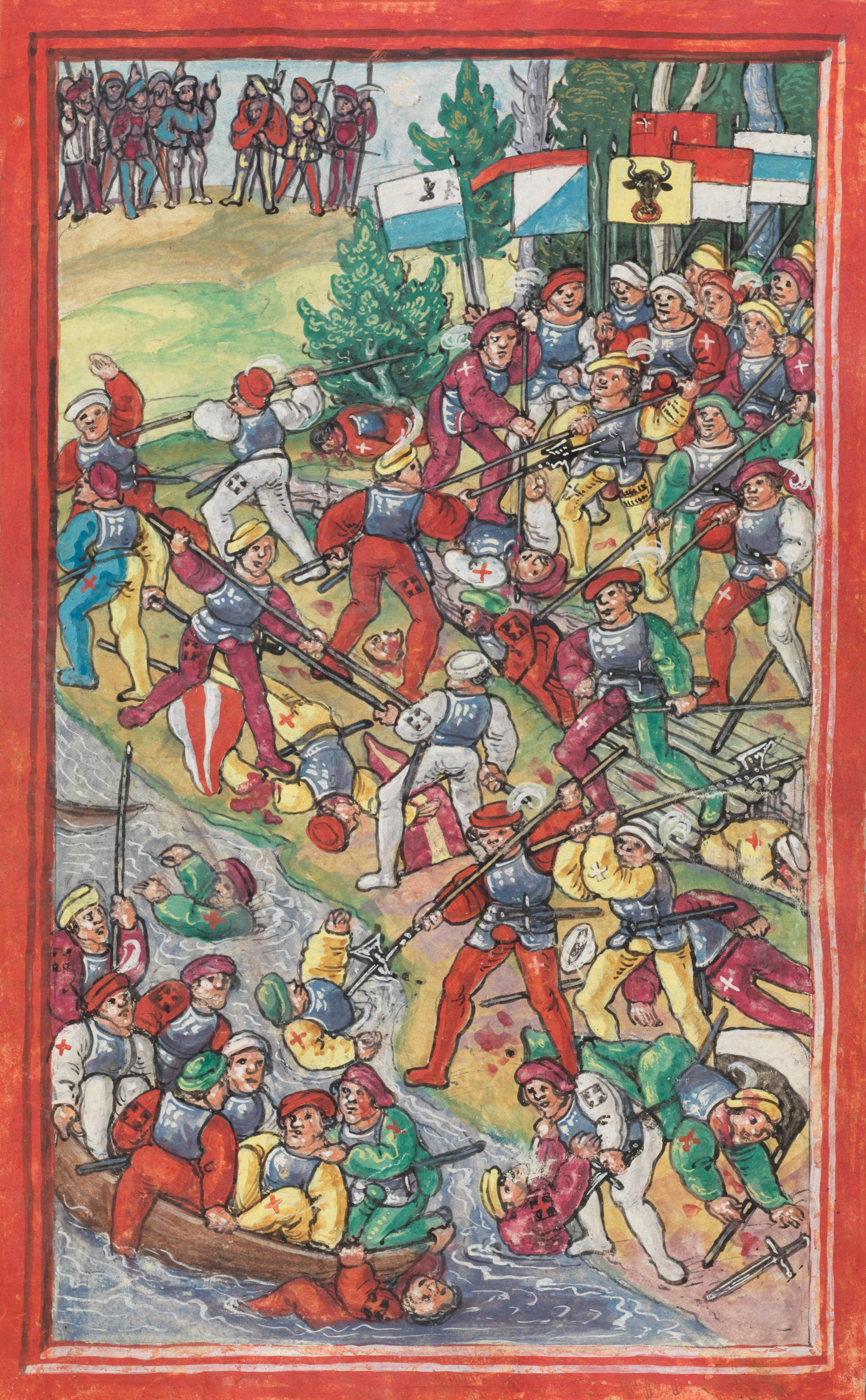
Battle of Hard (Swabian War)

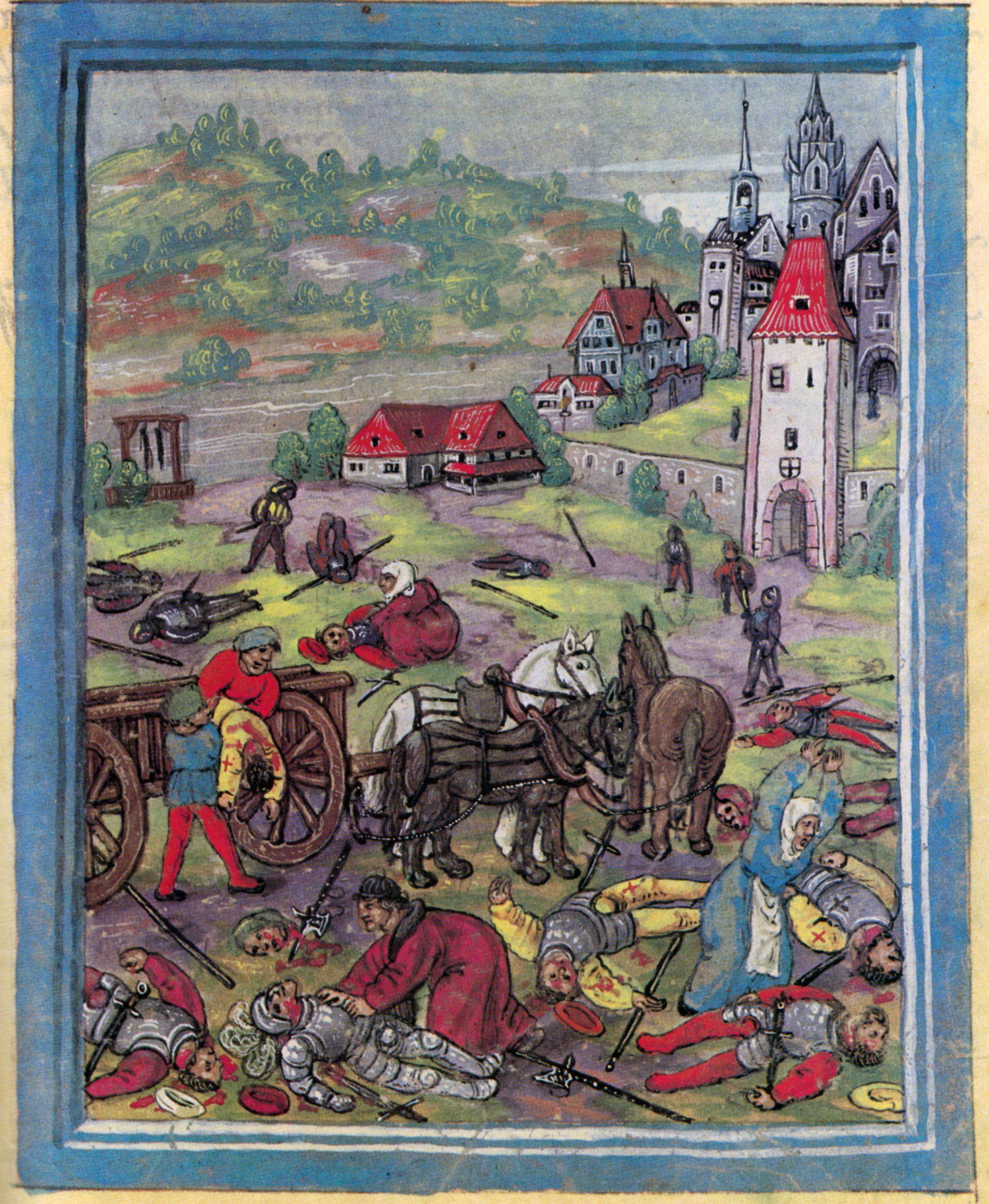
After the Battle of Triboltingen (Swabian War)

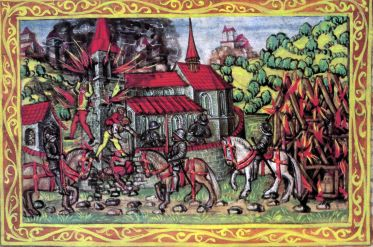
Storm of Thayngen (Swabian War)

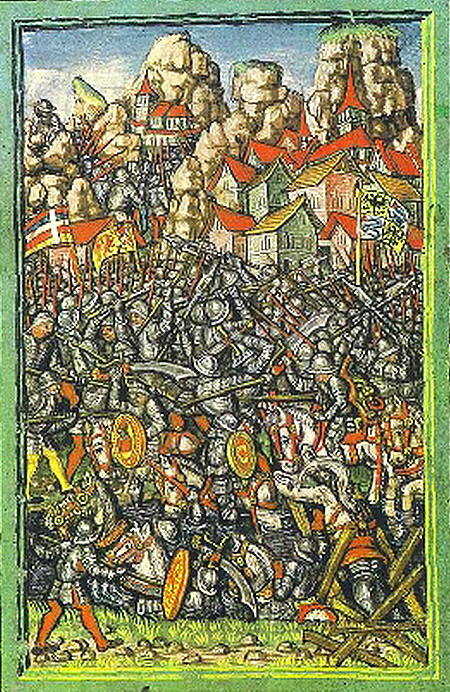
Battle of Giornico (28 December 1478)

== See also ==
- Swiss illustrated chronicles

== Literature ==
- Paul Ganz, The Lucerne Chronicle of Diebold Schilling, The Burlington Magazine (1933).
