= Battle of Bruderholz =

Battle during the Swabian War

- Part of Swabian War
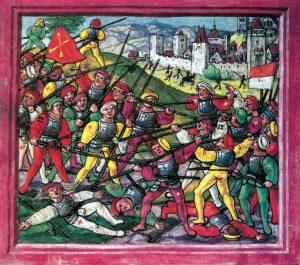
- Swiss forces (right) attack the Swabians (left, with the saltire) at the Bruderholz. In the background the city of Basel, which was neutral in the Swabian War.
Date	22 March 1499
Location	Near Basel, Switzerland 47°30′27″N 7°35′41″E
Result	Swiss victory

Belligerents
Old Swiss Confederacy	Swabian League

Strength
800	2,000

Casualties and losses
1	80
- Location within Switzerland Battle of Bruderholz (Canton of Basel-Land)

The Battle of Bruderholz took place on 22 March 1499 in the Swabian War between Swabian troops and forces of the Old Swiss Confederacy. The Swabians had raided several Swiss villages and were on their way back when they met troops from Lucerne, Solothurn, and Bern, who also came back from a raid in the Alsace. Anticipating the likely route of the Swabian troops, the Swiss soldiers concealed themselves in the woods at Bruderholz hill, near Basel. When the three times more numerous Swabians passed the woods, the Swiss attacked. The Swabian infantry quickly broke and fled the battlefield. The cavalry fought a delaying action allowing the infantry to escape before retreating also. Some of the fleeing soldiers ran approximately 2 miles (3.2 km) to the Rhine river before swimming across to continue their retreat. Others fled to Basel but were refused entry. The Confederation lost only a single soldier while the Swabians lost about 80 men. The leader of the Confederacy's troops was from the House of Bubenberg.
