= Battle of Dornach =

Battle of the Swabian War of 1499

Coordinates: 47°29′N 7°37′E

- Part of the Swabian War
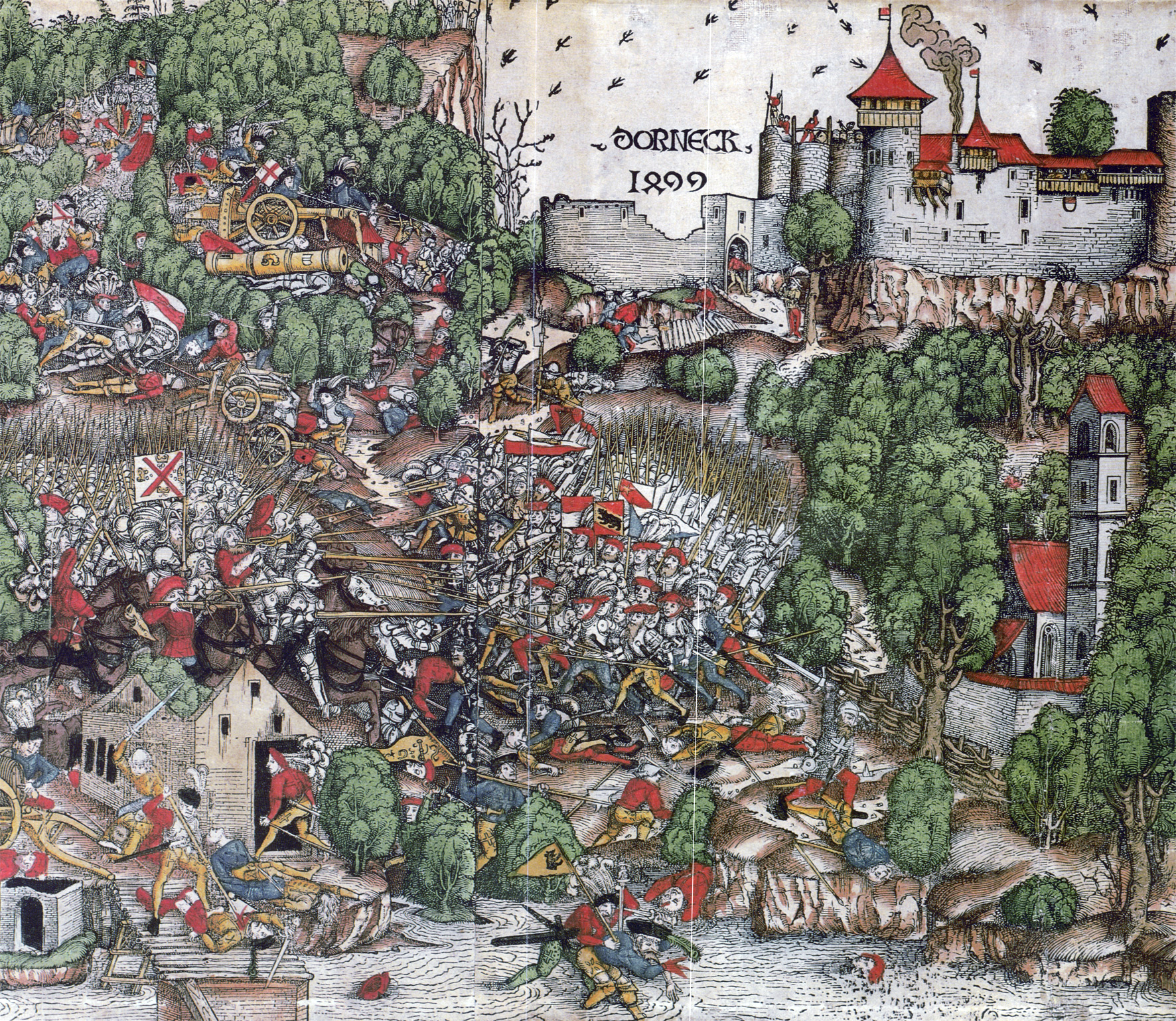
- Contemporary woodcut of the Battle of Dornach
Date	22 July 1499
Location	Dornach, Switzerland
Result	Swiss victory

Belligerents
Old Swiss Confederacy: Solothurn; Bern; Zürich; Lucerne; Zug	Holy Roman Empire

Commanders and leaders
	Heinrich von Fürstenberg †

Strength
6,000	15,000–16,000

Casualties and losses
600–900	4,000

The Battle of Dornach was fought on 22 July 1499 between the troops of Emperor Maximilian I and the Old Swiss Confederacy, close to the Swiss village of Dornach. The battle ended in a decisive defeat for Maximilian, and concluded the Swabian War between the Swiss and the Swabian League.

== Battle ==
Maximilian had ordered Field Marshal Count Heinrich von Fürstenberg to capture Dorneck Castle, held by Solothurn, which would allow his troops to reach as far as the valley of the Aare. From May 1499 on, Fürstenberg had gathered between 15,000 and 16,000 thousand soldiers in Sundgau. Solothurn called the Swiss cantons for help, and a total of about 5,000 troops from Solothurn, Bern, Zürich, Lucerne and Zug engaged Maximilian's troops on 22 July. Many of these were bathing in the Birs.

The first attacks on 22 July were executed by the troops of Bern, Zürich, and Solothurn, but they were beaten back. Near dusk, with the arrival of a thousand reinforcements from Lucerne and Zug, which suddenly broke out of the woods "with horns and shouting" were the Imperial troops turned to flight after several hours' fighting.

About 4,000 Imperial troops, including Field Marshal von Fürstenberg, were killed in the fighting, while Swiss losses amounted to about six hundred to nine hundred.

== Aftermath ==
The battle of Dornach was the last armed conflict between the Swiss and any member state of the Holy Roman Empire. The Treaty of Basel of 22 September 1499 was the conclusion of the war. It was a strategic victory for the Swiss Confederacy, revoking the imperial ban against the Swiss cantons, legalising the alliance of the League of the Ten Jurisdictions with the Confederates, and placing the Thurgau under Swiss jurisdiction.

A relief wall was erected in 1949 in the town of Dornach commemorating the battle.
