= Treaty of Basel (1499) =

Treaty between the Swabian League and the Swiss Confederacy

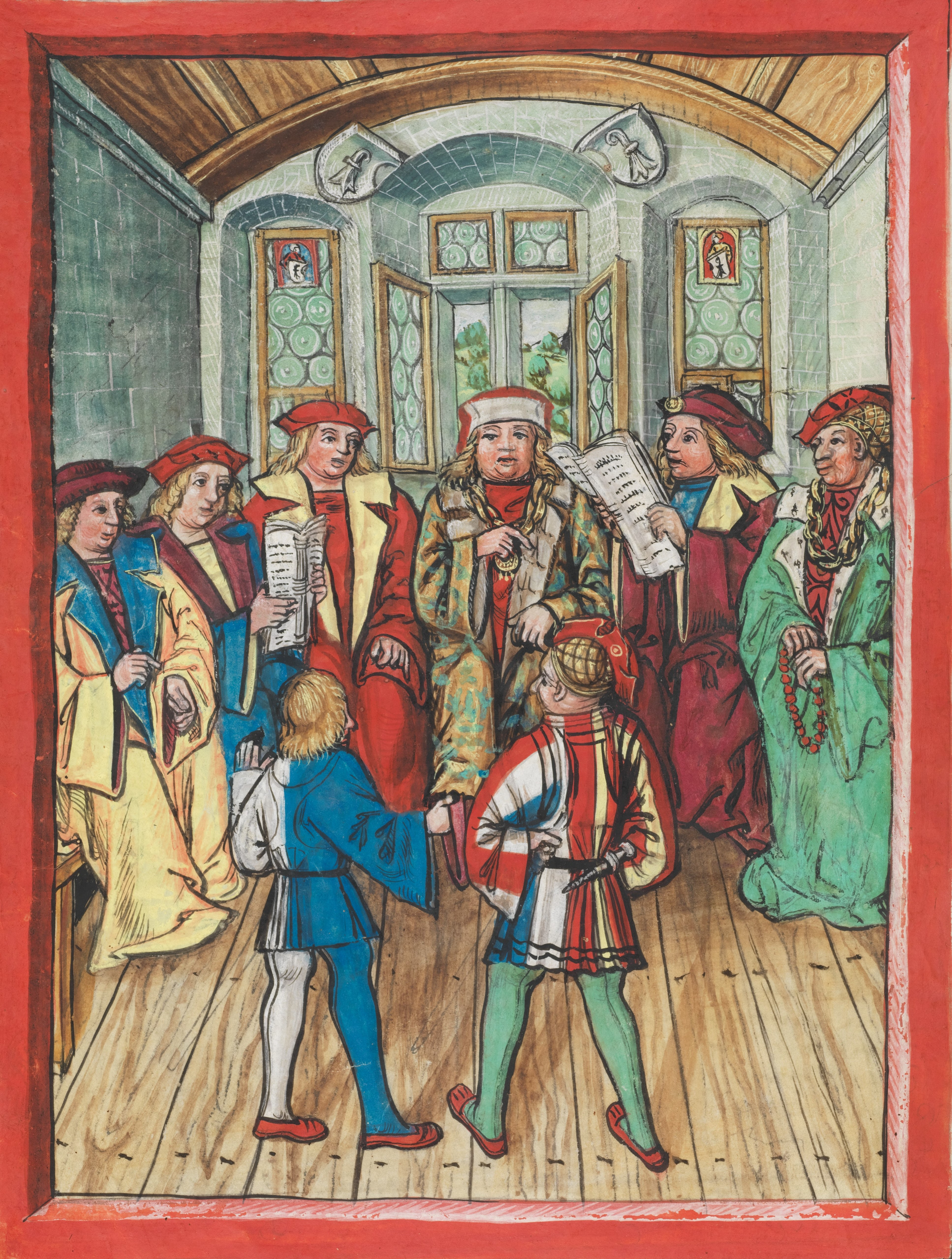
- Negotiations for the Treaty of Basel in 1499 at the end of the Swabian War. The Milanese envoy Galeazzo Visconti presents his peace proposals to the delegation of Holy Roman Emperor Maximilian I at the city hall of Basel. A delegate from Lucerne (front left, in the blue-white dress) translates.
- Signed: 22 September 1499
- Location: Basel, Swiss Confederacy
- Parties: Swiss Confederacy; Swabian League

The Treaty of Basel of 22 September 1499 was an armistice following the Battle of Dornach, concluding the Swabian War, fought between the Swabian League and the Old Swiss Confederacy.

Though the war had concluded in multiple Swiss victories, both Switzerland and the Swabian League were exhausted, and the leaders of both sides desired peace. The two sides would meet in Basel to agree to terms of peace.

The treaty restored the status quo ante territorially. Eight out of the ten members in the League of the Ten Jurisdictions were confirmed as nominally subject to the Habsburgs, but their membership in the league and their alliance with the Swiss Confederacy was to remain in place.

The Swiss were also absolved from Austrian imperial taxes and imperial jurisdiction. Thus, the Swiss Confederacy was de facto independent and not made to join an Imperial Circle. The Habsburgs were forced to relinquish their dynastic claims in Switzerland.

Jurisdiction over Thurgau, previously an Imperial loan to the city of Constance, was to pass to the Swiss Confederacy. The imperial ban and all embargoes against the Swiss cantons were to be discontinued.

In 19th-century Swiss historiography, the treaty was presented as an important step towards de facto independence of the Swiss Confederacy from the Holy Roman Empire. In the words of Wilhelm Oechsli (1890), the treaty represented "the recognition of Swiss independence by Germany". This view has come to be viewed as untenable in 20th-century literature (Sigrist 1949, Mommsen 1958), as there is no indication that the leaders of the Confederacy at the time had any desire to distance themselves from the Empire. Nevertheless, the Confederacy was substantially strengthened as a polity within the Empire by the treaty, and an immediate consequence of this was the accession of Basel and Schaffhausen in 1501, as part of the expansion (1481–1513) from the late medieval Eight Cantons to the early modern Thirteen Cantons.

== See also ==
- List of treaties
