= Battle of Hard =

- Part of the Swabian War
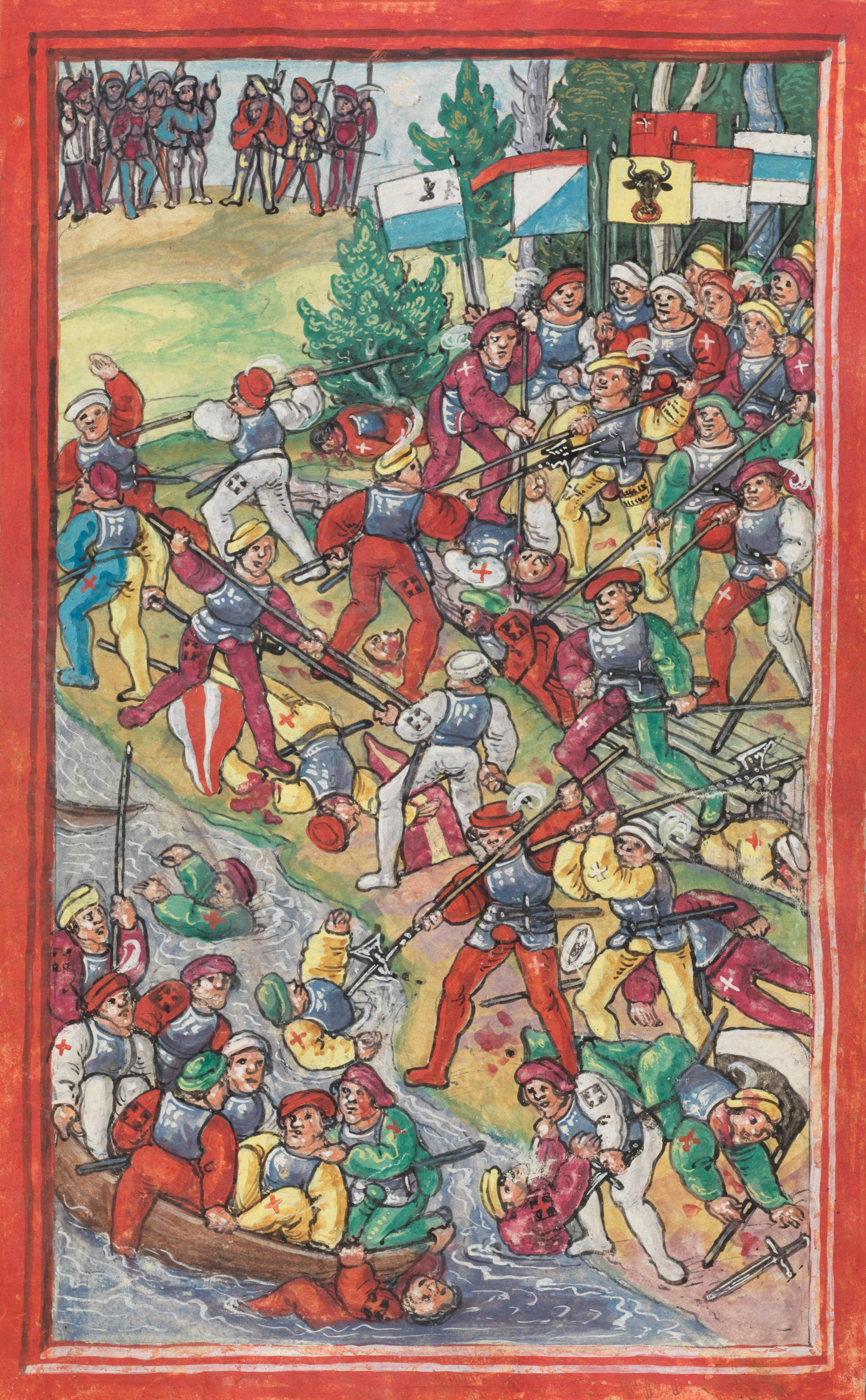
Date	20 February 1499
Location	Hard, Austria, southeast of Bregenz
Result	Swiss victory

Belligerents
Old Swiss Confederacy	Holy Roman Empire

Strength
Unknown	10,000

Casualties and losses
Unknown	Heavy

The Battle of Hard was the first large-scale battle in the Swabian War, waged between the Imperials under the Holy Roman Emperor Maximilian I and the Swiss Confederates. The battle was fought on 20 February 1499, a cold and foggy day, between 10,000 Imperial troops, mostly from the Swabian Circles, and a smaller number of Swiss troops, often called Reisläufer.

The battle took place in the westernmost part of modern-day Austria, in the vicinity of the southeast corner of Lake Constance, roughly southwest of the town of Bregenz. The Imperial army had deployed its advance guard between the towns of Lustenau and Höchst, south of the lake town of Hard. On the morning of the battle the Imperial advance guard discovered the advanced guard of the invading Swiss army marching down the right bank of the Rhine, attacked it, and caused it to recoil toward Hard.

The surprised Imperials, alerted to the Swiss attack, hastily deployed themselves into battle order near the town of Lauterach and set up their artillery. The Swiss main body had meanwhile arrived in the area of battle, and skillfully deployed its attack columns so as to deny the Imperials the maximum benefit of their artillery superiority.

Both armies were composed primarily of infantry, many of whom were armed with a very long spear called a spiess (pike), others with a polearm called a halberd. These would be deployed in very deep infantry combat columns. Smaller bodies of men would skirmish around these columns, firing with crossbows or primitive muzzle-loading firearms called the arquebus. The Imperial army had an artillery train and a small force of armoured knights, although it is not known whether these fought on horseback, or, as was often their custom, on foot amongst the infantry pike columns.

The Swiss attack columns precipitously attacked the Imperial positions, staggered under the weight of the defensive fire from the Imperial artillery, but, propelled forward by their serious warfighting ethos, kept up the assault. Colliding with the Imperial infantry columns, the Swiss rapidly threw the Swabian forces into disorder, then rout.

The Swabians were unable to mount a fighting withdrawal, and as a result, many fleeing troops were massacred by the Swiss, as was their custom. The Swabian soldiers were aware of this custom, and a panic ensued. Some Imperial troops fled to Bregenz, others attempted to board three nearby ships, which overturned in the chaos and sank, drowning many of the fleeing infantry and knights. Others sought hiding places where they could, and, ill-equipped to overnight in the prevailing terrible cold, died of exposure. Although the victorious Swiss performed at best a sloppy pursuit, focusing more on pillaging than on a systematic pursuit (another of their customs), by the end of the battle several thousand Swabian corpses nonetheless littered the battlefield, and were eventually buried in a mass grave outside the Chapel of Hard.
