= Swabia (Bavaria) =

Coordinates: 48.5°N 10.5°E

Swabia Schwaben (German)
- Regierungsbezirk
- Flag Coat of arms

- Map of Bavaria highlighting Swabia
- Country: Germany
- State: Bavaria
- Region seat: Augsburg

Government
  - District President: Martin Sailer (CSU)

Area
  - Total: 9,993.97 km^{2} (3,858.69 sq mi)

Population (31 December 2025)
  - Total: 1,935,836
  - Density: 193.700/km^{2} (501.682/sq mi)

GDP
  - Total: €93.507 billion (2024)
  - Per capita: €48,374 (2024)
- Website: Schwaben

Swabia (German: Schwaben, Swabian: Schwaabe, Bavarian: Schwobm) is one of the seven administrative regions of Bavaria, Germany. It consists of ten districts and 340 municipalities (including four cities) with Augsburg being the administrative capital.

== Governance ==
The county of Swabia is located in southwest Bavaria. It was annexed by Bavaria in 1803, is part of the historic region of Swabia and was formerly ruled by dukes of the Hohenstaufen dynasty. During the Nazi period, the area was separated from the rest of Bavaria to become the Gau Swabia. It was re-incorporated into Bavaria after the war.

The Regierungsbezirk is subdivided into 3 regions (Planungsregionen): Allgäu, Augsburg, and Donau-Iller. Donau-Iller also includes two districts and one city of Baden-Württemberg.

Landkreise
(rural districts)
- Aichach-Friedberg
- Augsburg
- Dillingen
- Donau-Ries
- Günzburg
- Lindau
- Neu-Ulm
- Oberallgäu
- Ostallgäu
- Unterallgäu
Kreisfreie Städte
(district-free towns)
- Augsburg
- Kaufbeuren
- Kempten
- Memmingen
Natural regions
- Nördlinger Ries*
- Swabian Jura
- Iller-Lech Plateau
- Southern Alpine Foreland
- Swabian-Bavarian Pre-Alps
- Northern Limestone Alps
- Upper Swabia

* Part of the Swabian Keuper Land

== Districts and district-free towns before the regional reorganization in 1972 ==
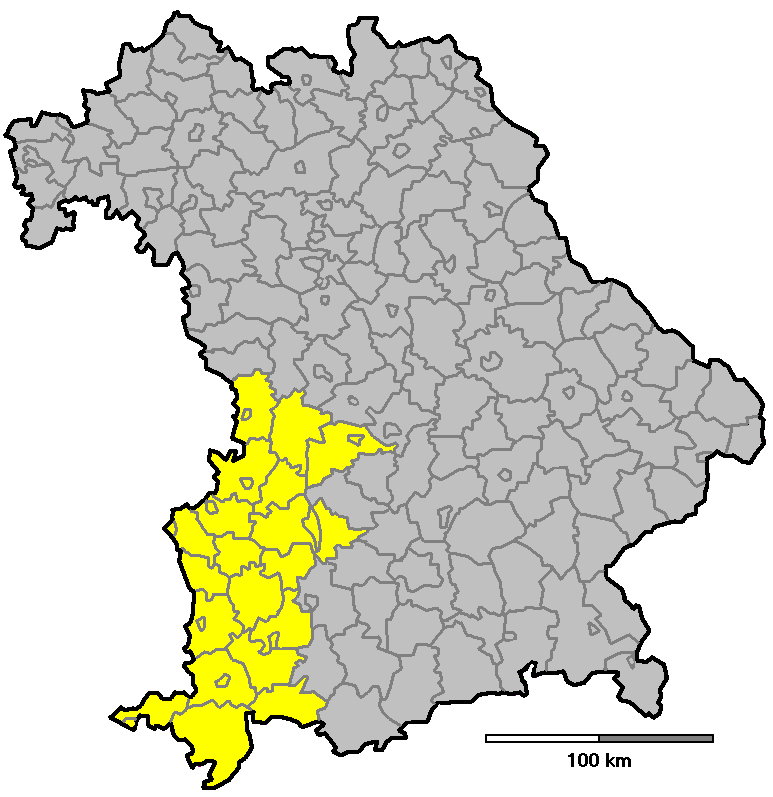
Swabia before the regional reorganization in 1972

Kreisfreie Städte
(district-free towns)
- Augsburg
- Dillingen an der Donau
- Günzburg
- Kaufbeuren
- Kempten
- Lindau
- Memmingen
- Neuburg an der Donau
- Neu-Ulm
- Nördlingen
Landkreise
(districts)
- Augsburg
- Dillingen
- Donauwörth
- Friedberg
- Füssen
- Günzburg
- Illertissen
- Kaufbeuren
- Kempten
- Krumbach
Landkreise
(districts)
(continuation)
- Lindau
- Marktoberdorf
- Memmingen
- Mindelheim
- Neuburg an der Donau
- Neu-Ulm
- Nördlingen
- Schwabmünchen
- Sonthofen
- Wertingen

== Population ==
Historical population of Swabia:

- 1939: 934,311
- 1950: 1,293,734
- 1961: 1,340,217
- 1970: 1,467,454
- 1987: 1,546,504
- 2002: 1,776,465
- 2005: 1,788,919
- 2006: 1,786,764
- 2008: 1,787,995
- 2010: 1,785,875
- 2015: 1,846,020
- 2019: 1,899,442

== Economy ==
The Gross domestic product (GDP) of the region was € 74.8 billion in 2018, accounting for 2.2% of German economic output. GDP per capita adjusted for purchasing power was € 36,500 or 121% of the EU27 average in the same year. The GDP per employee was 101% of the EU average.

== History ==
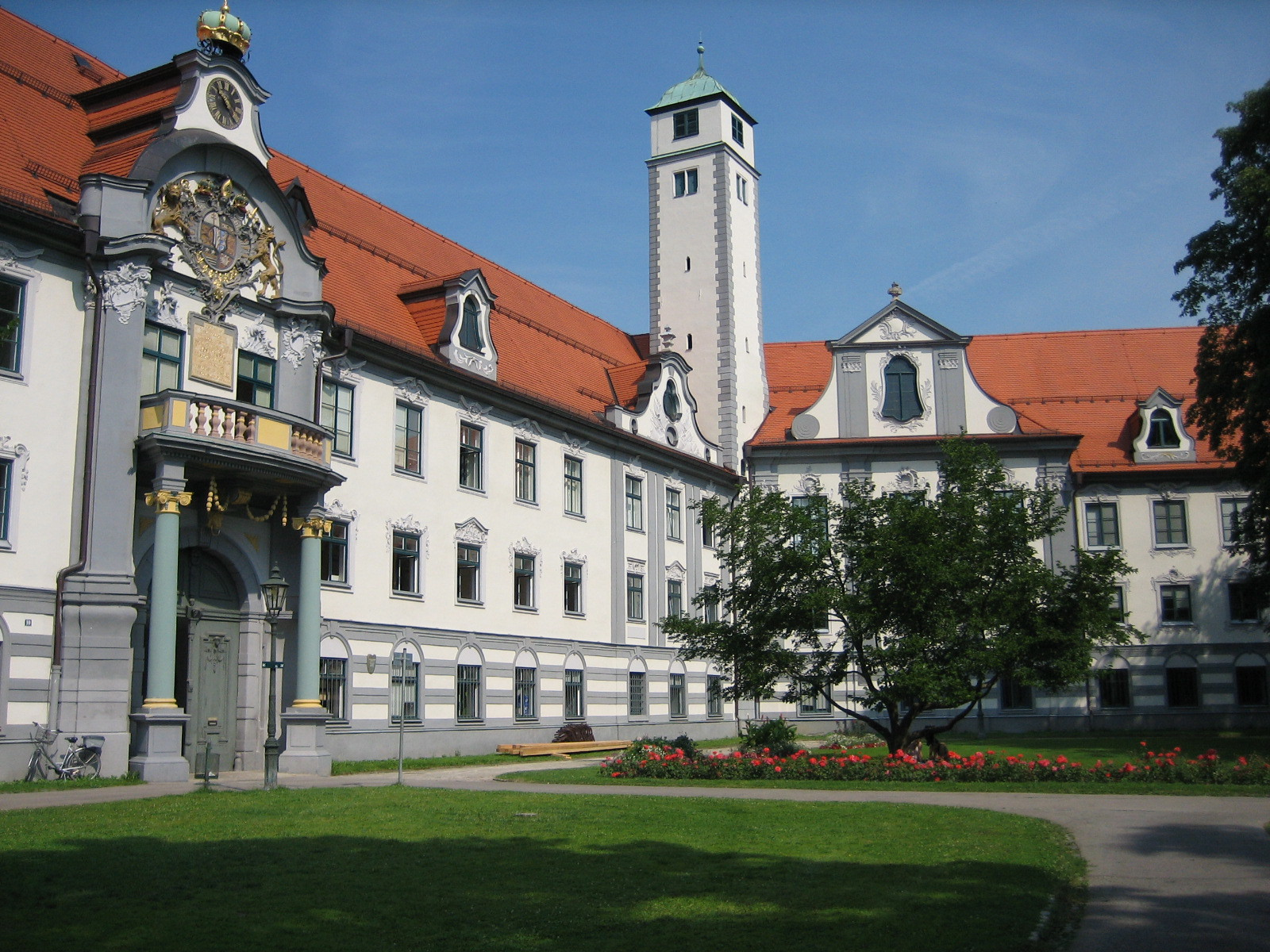
Regierung von Schwaben - Superior administration of Swabia (former Fürstbischöfliche Residenz) in Augsburg

The Bavarian administrative region of Swabia is the eastern part of the Duchy of Swabia. After the execution of the Swabian duke Conradin in Naples in 1268, his uncle, the Bavarian duke Louis, inherited some of Conradin's possessions in Swabia. In 1803, with the German Mediatisation, Bavaria acquired the further East Swabian territories, which were merged with Palatinate-Neuburg.

After the founding of the Kingdom of Bavaria, the state was totally reorganised and, in 1808, divided into 15 administrative districts (German: Regierungsbezirke), in Bavaria called Kreise. They were created in the fashion of the French departements, quite even in size and population, and named after their main rivers.

In the following years, due to territorial changes (e.g. the loss of Tyrol, the addition of the Palatinate), the number of districts was reduced to 8. The Swabian territories were merged with Palatinate-Neuburg and the new district was called Oberdonaukreis (Upper Danube District). In 1837, king Ludwig I of Bavaria renamed all the districts after historical territorial names and tribes of the area. This also involved some border changes or territorial swaps. Thus the name Oberdonaukreis changed to Swabia.

In 1945, the town of Lindau was detached from Bavaria by France, but it was reunited with the district of Swabia in 1955. In 1972, the former Swabian city Neuburg an der Donau was reunited with the district of Upper Bavaria.

== Main sites ==
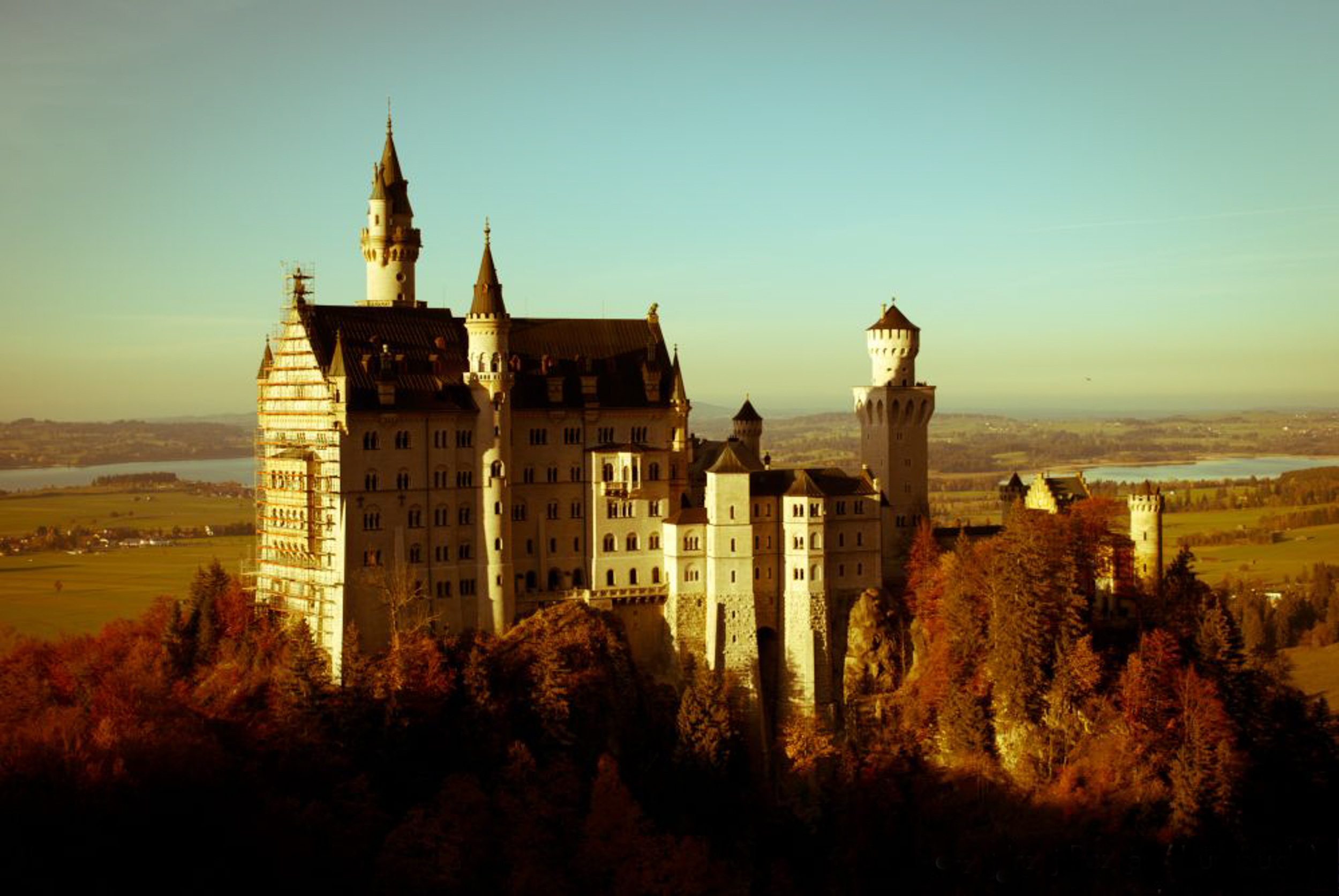
Neuschwanstein Castle, Schwangau

Major attractions include the capital Augsburg; several other old cities including Donauwörth, Nördlingen, Memmingen, Mindelheim, Kaufbeuren and Kempten; the Ottobeuren Abbey and the scenic attractions of the River Danube in the north; the Allgäu in the south; the Allgäu Alps with mount Hochfrottspitze, mount Hochvogel and Oberstdorf; and the royal castles of Hohenschwangau, Neuschwanstein and Füssen. With the district of Lindau, Bavarian Swabia has access to Lake Constance.

== Food and drink ==
Swabian cuisine is down-to-earth and rather simple. Noodle products are very important.

- Brenntar
- Spätzle
- Maultaschen
- Bergkäse
- Schupfnudel
- Alb-Leisa
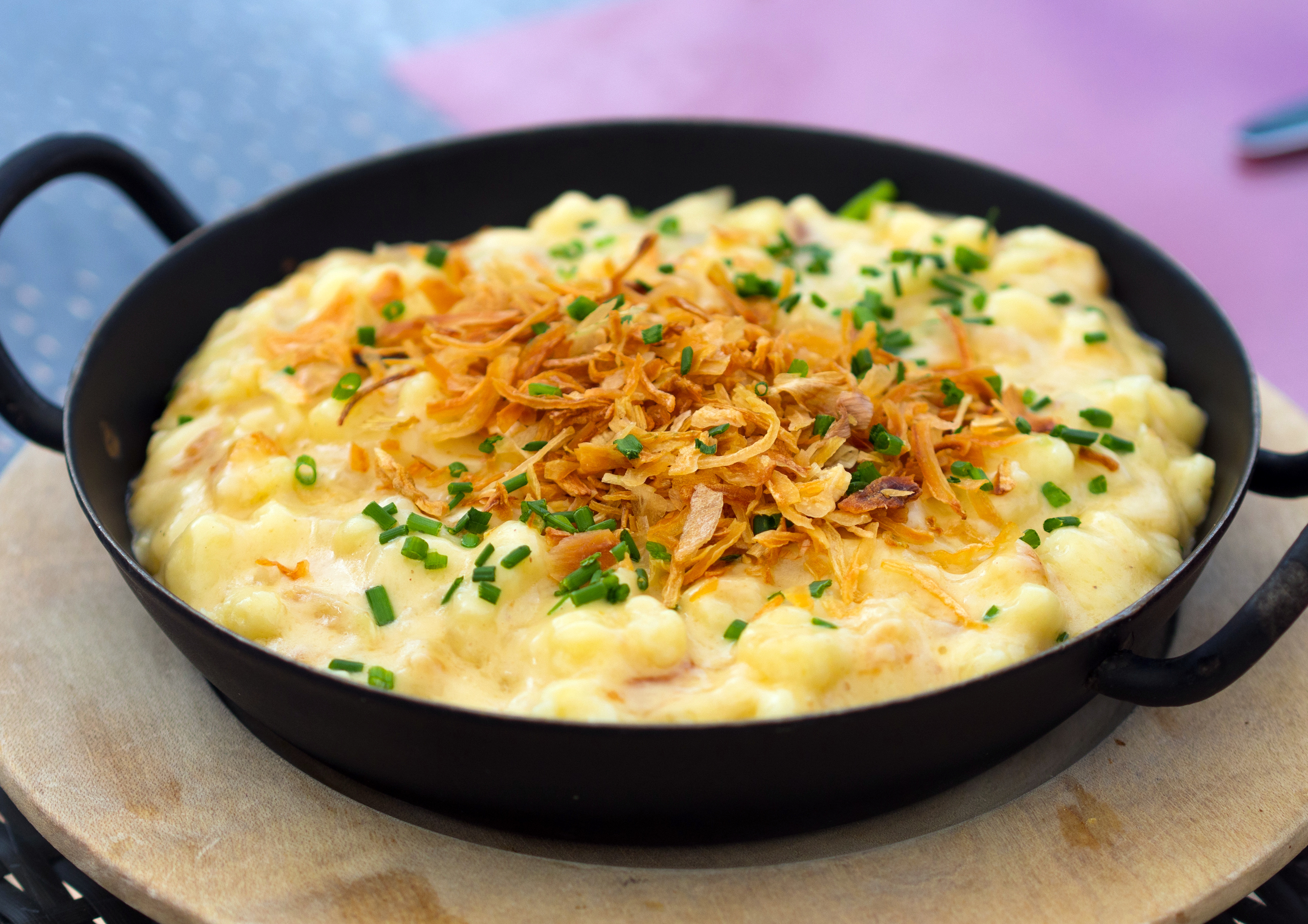
Cheese Spätzle

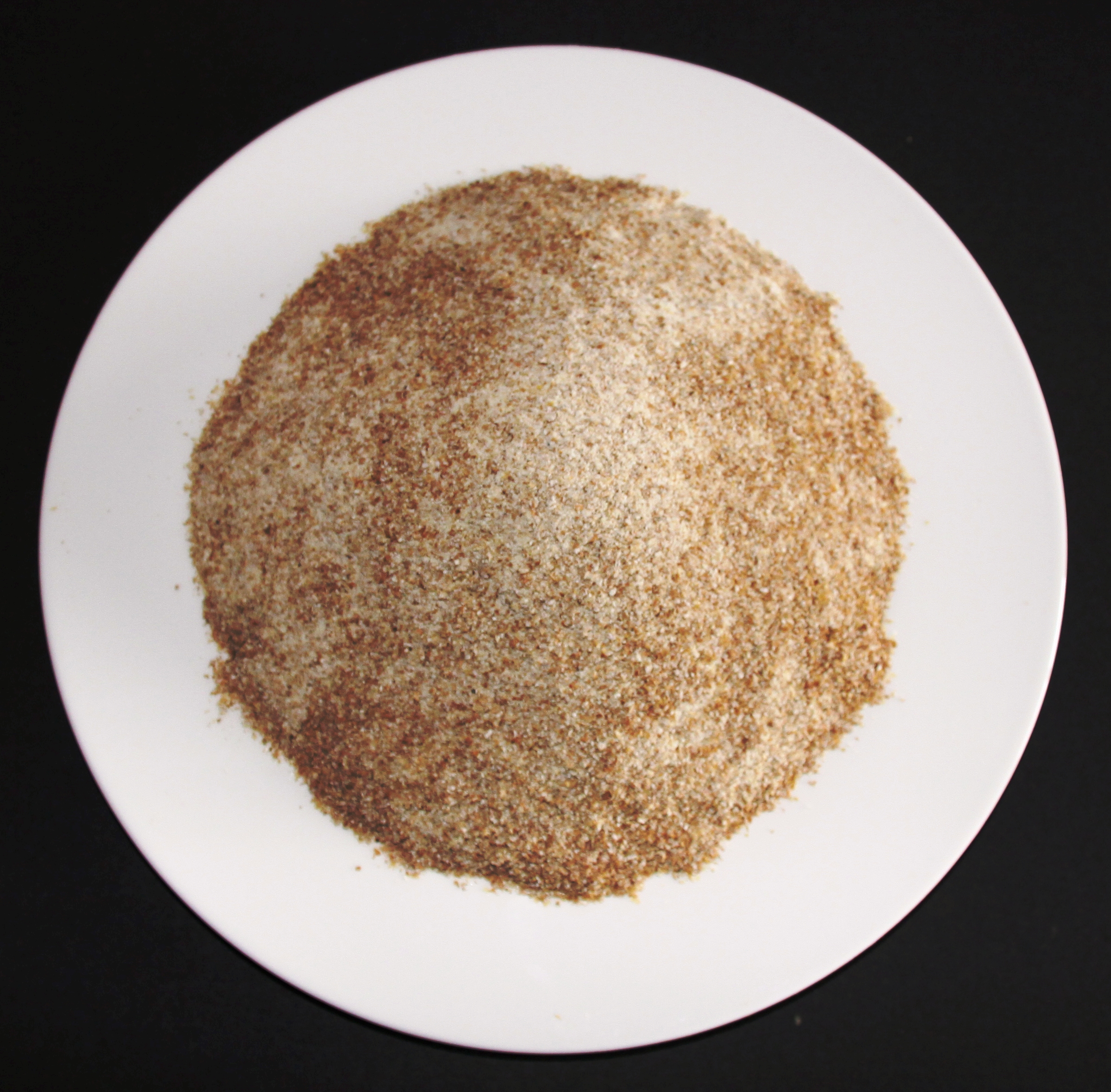
Musmehl, main ingredient of Brenntar

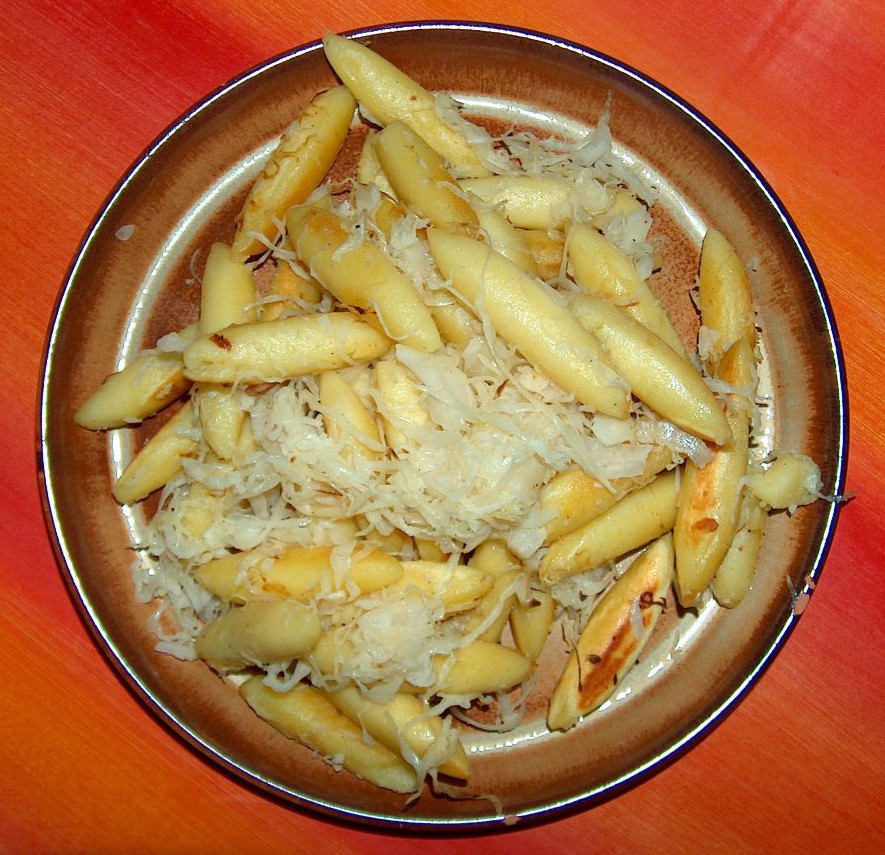
Schupfnudel with sauerkraut

== Notable people ==
- Michael Bredl (1916–1999), a singer and collector of traditional Swabian Volksmusik
- Ludwig Aurbacher (1784–1847), famous for his stories about The Seven Swabians
- Ludwig Ganghofer (1855–1920), writer and inventor
- Sebastian Kneipp (1821–1897), inventor of Kneipp-Kur hydrotherapy

== See also ==
- Swabian Keuper-Lias Plains
