= Mühlberger =

Mühlberger or Muhlberger is a German language habitational surname for someone from a place called Mühlberg. Notable people with the name include:

- Eugen Mühlberger (1902–1944), German weightlifter
- Gregor Mühlberger (1992), German mathematician
- Richard Muhlberger (1938–2019), American art critic, and museum curator
