= Swabians =

German ethnographic group

Schwaben
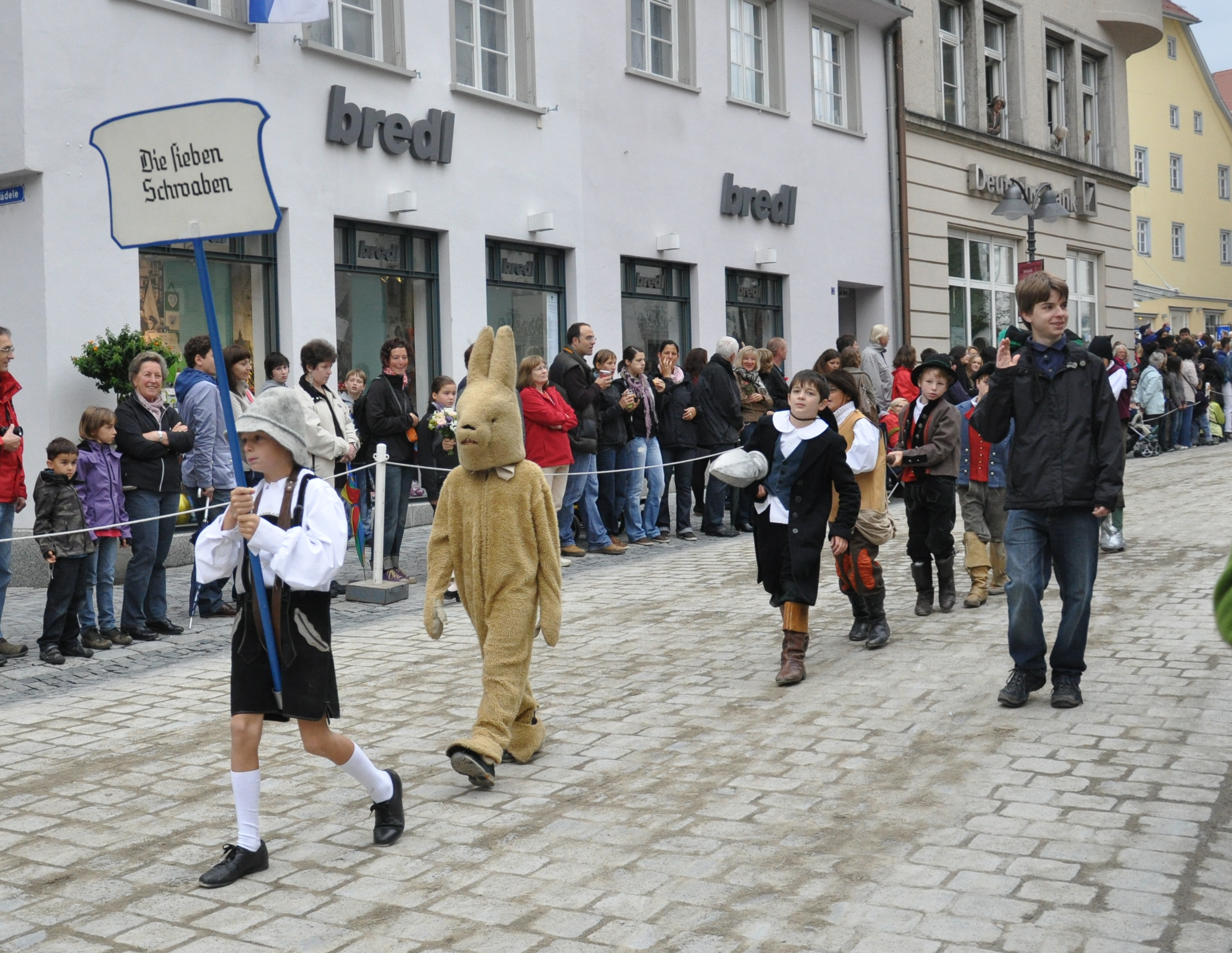
- Rutenfest in Ravensburg, Baden-Württemberg, Germany, celebrating the folklore story of "The Seven Swabians" by the Brothers Grimm

Regions with significant populations
- Germany (Baden-Württemberg, Bavaria)

Languages
- German (Swabian)

Religion
- primarily Roman Catholicism and Lutheranism

Related ethnic groups
- Suebi

Swabians (German: Schwaben pronounced [ˈʃvaːbn̩], singular Schwabe) are a German ethnographic group native to the region of Swabia, which is mostly divided between the modern states of Baden-Württemberg and Bavaria, in southwestern Germany.

The name is ultimately derived from the medieval Duchy of Swabia, one of the German stem duchies, representing the territory of Alemannia, whose Germanic inhabitants were interchangeably called Alemanni or Suebi. This territory would include all of the Alemannic German area, but the modern concept of Swabia is more restricted, due to the collapse of the duchy of Swabia in the 13th century. Swabia as understood in modern ethnography roughly coincides with the Swabian Circle of the Holy Roman Empire as it stood during the Early Modern period.

== Culture ==
Swabian culture, as distinct from its Alemannic neighbours, evolved in the later medieval and early modern period. After the disintegration of the Duchy of Swabia, a Swabian cultural identity and sense of cultural unity survived, expressed in the formation of the Swabian League of Cities in the 14th century, the Swabian League of 1488, and the establishment of the Swabian Circle in 1512. During this time, a division of culture and identity developed between Swabia and both the Margraviate of Baden to the west and the Swiss Confederacy to the south.

Swabian culture retains many elements common to Alemannic tradition, notably the carnival traditions forming the Swabian-Alemannic Fastnacht.

A public relations campaign by the state of Baden-Württemberg, translated "We can do everything—except speak Standard German." (see article text)

As the national cultural consensus surrounding German unification was built during the 18th and 19th century, Germany was politically dominated by the northern Kingdom of Prussia, and Weimar Classicism in the Duchy of Saxe-Weimar became the expression of German national high culture (Christoph Martin Wieland and Friedrich Schiller, while born and raised in Swabia, moved to Weimar and became two of the "four luminaries" (Viergestirn) of Weimar Classicism).

As a consequence, southern Germany and by extension both the Swabians and the Bavarians came to be seen as marked deviations from generic Standard German, and a number of clichés or stereotypes developed. These portrayed the Swabians as stingy, overly serious or prudish petty bourgeois simpletons, as reflected in "The Seven Swabians" (Die sieben Schwaben), one of the Kinder- und Hausmärchen published by the Brothers Grimm. On the positive side, the same stereotype may be expressed in portraying the Swabians as frugal, clever, entrepreneurial and hard-working. The economic recovery of Germany after the Second World War, known as the Wirtschaftswunder, was praised by songwriter Ralf Bendix in his 1964 Schaffe, schaffe Häusle baue / Und net nach de Mädle schaue ("[let's] work and work, and build a house / and not look out for girls" in Swabian dialect). The first line of his song has since become a common summary of Swabian stereotypes known throughout Germany. In a widely noted publicity campaign on the occasion of the 50th anniversary of Baden-Württemberg, economically the most successful state in modern Germany, the Swabians famously embraced their stereotyping, "We can do everything—except speak Standard German" (Wir können alles. Außer Hochdeutsch).

Swabian stereotypes persist in contemporary Germany, as expressed e.g. in the "Schwabenhass" conflict (surrounding gentrification in Berlin due to the large number of well-to-do Swabians moving to the capital), or a remark by chancellor Angela Merkel in praise of the "thrifty Swabian housewife" (recommending Swabian, and by extension German economic prudence as a model for Europe during the euro area crisis).

== Swabian German ==
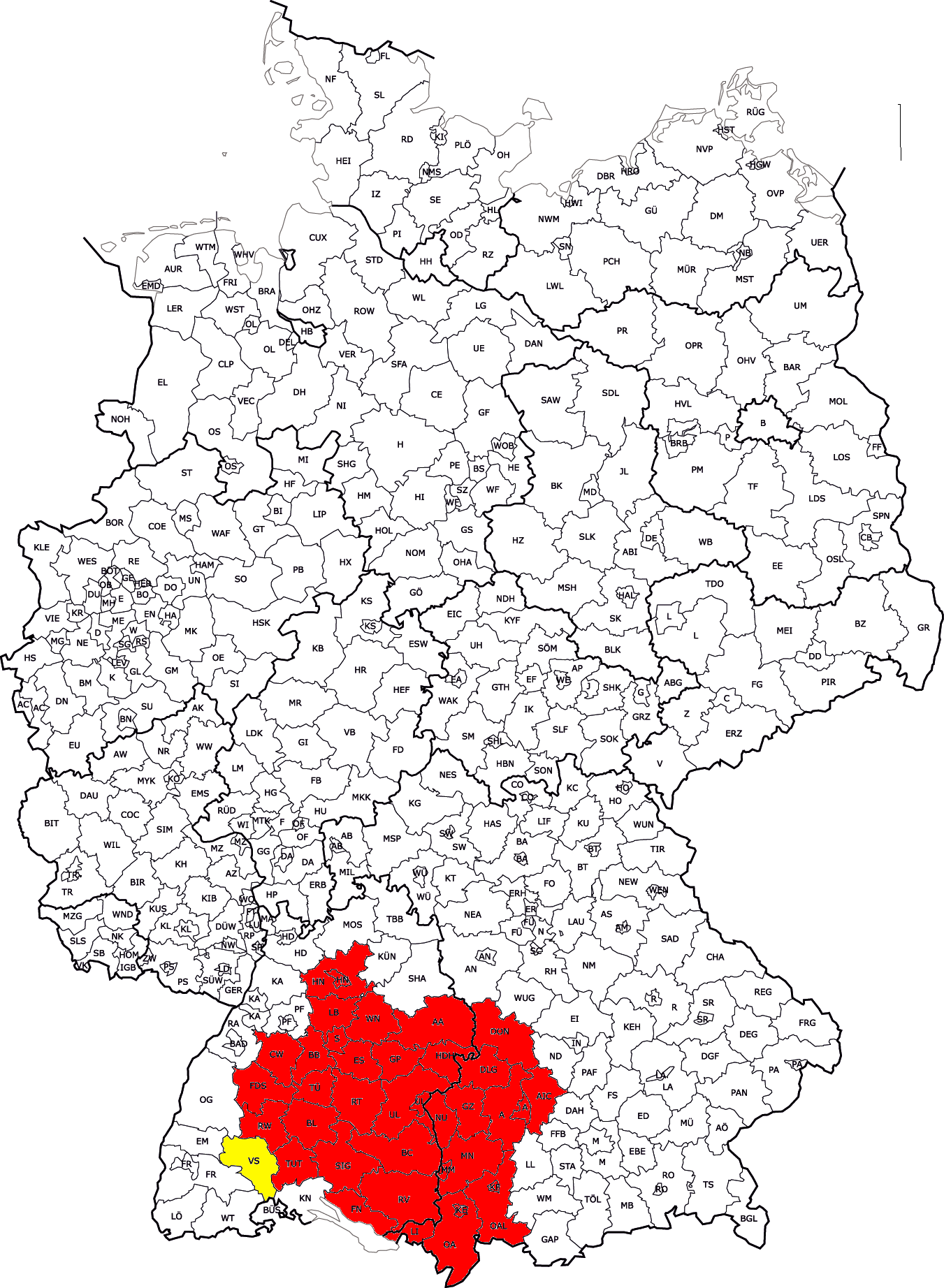
Swabia within modern Germany (shown in yellow is Schwarzwald-Baar-Kreis, situated at the transitional area between the Swabian, Upper Rhenish and Lake Constance dialects within Alemannic)

The ethno-linguistic group of Swabians speak Swabian German, a branch of the Alemannic group of German dialects. Swabian is cited as "40 percent intelligible" to speakers of Standard German. As an ethno-linguistic group, Swabians are closely related to other speakers of Alemannic German, i.e. Badeners, Alsatians, and German-speaking Swiss.

Swabian German is traditionally spoken in the upper Neckar basin (upstream of Heilbronn), along the upper Danube between Tuttlingen and Donauwörth, and on the left bank of the Lech, in an areal centered on the Swabian Alps roughly stretching from Stuttgart to Augsburg. SIL Ethnologue cites an estimate of 819,000 Swabian speakers as of 2006.

== Emigration ==
=== Hollandgänger ===
During the 17th and 18th century, the Dutch Republic was known for its wealth and religious tolerance, and substantial numbers of Swabians moved there in search of either work or religious freedom. Those with large debts ended up conscripted as sailors and soldiers for the Dutch East India Company (DEIC), eventually settling in the Dutch Cape Colony, Dutch East Indies or Sri Lanka. Besides individual Swabians, the Duke Charles Eugene of Württemberg concluded an agreement with the DEIC in 1786 to furnish a regiment of 2000 men to the DEIC for the sum of 300 000 guilders. This became known as the Württemberg Cape Regiment (German: Württembergisches Kapregiment). Their presence among the Dutch at the Cape contributed to the Dutch term swaapstreek (literally: "Swabian shenanigans"), likely referencing the Seven Swabians tale.

=== Ostsiedlung ===
During the 18th century East Colonisation, many Swabians were attracted by the Austrian Empire's offer of settling in East European lands which had been left sparsely populated by the wars with Turkey. These ethnic German communities came to be known collectively as the Danube Swabians, subdivided into such groups as the Banat Swabians, Satu Mare Swabians and others (although the name "Danube Swabians" was applied also to German settlers of non-Swabian background).

Swabians settled also in eastern Croatia (Slavonia and Syrmia), and southern and western Hungary, including part of what is now Serbia and Romania (the Danube Swabians, Satu Mare Swabians, Banat Swabians and Swabian Turkey) in the 18th century, where they were invited as pioneers to repopulate some areas.

They also settled in Russia, Bessarabia, and Kazakhstan. They were well-respected as farmers.

Almost all of the several million Swabians were expelled from Hungary, Romania, and Yugoslavia during the period 1944–1950, as part of the ethnic cleansing against their German minorities. There still are Swabians living near the city of Satu Mare in Romania, who are known as Satu Mare Swabians.

=== Overseas ===
Because of overpopulation and increasingly smaller land-holdings, many Swabians sought land in the Western Hemisphere, especially in the 19th century. Swabian settlements can be found in Brazil, Canada, and the United States. Among the Germans who emigrated to the United States in the 19th century, Swabians in some areas maintained their regional identity and formed organizations for mutual support.

=== Recent migration within Germany ===
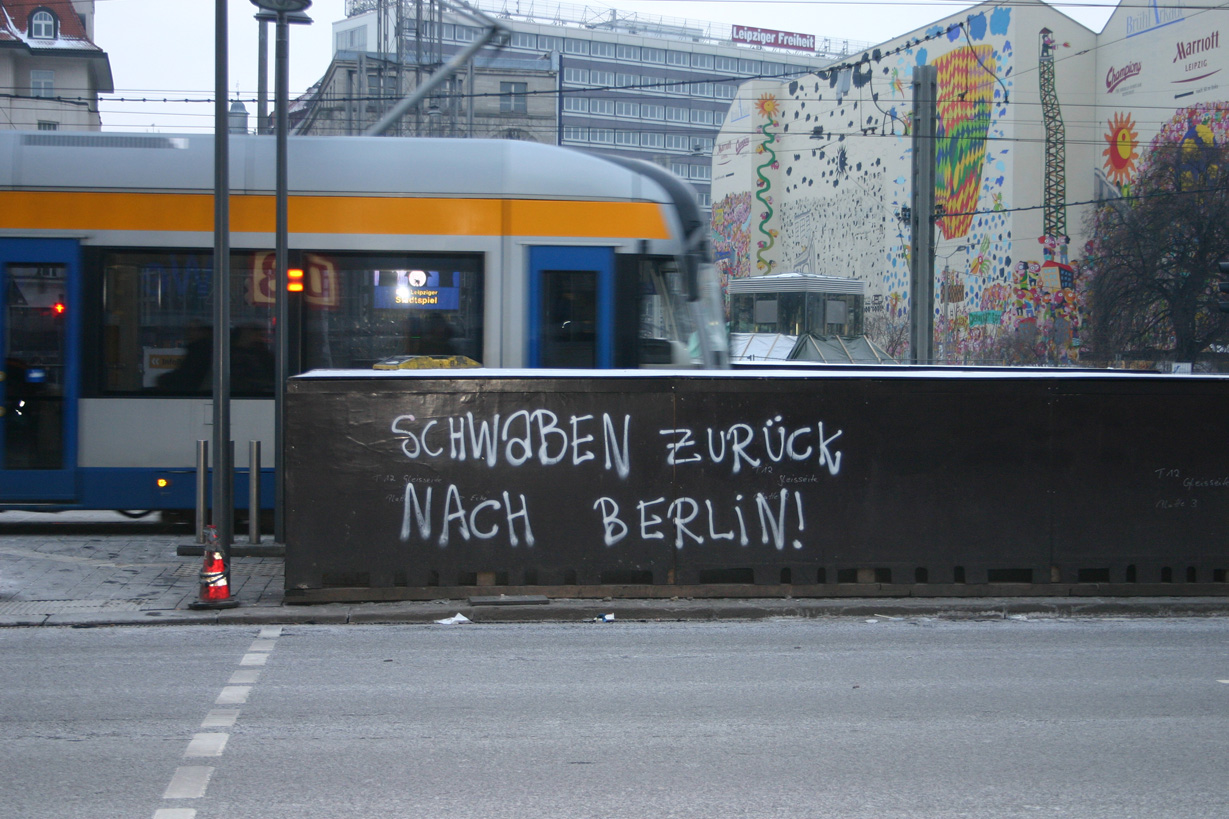
"Swabians, go back to Berlin", Leipzig graffiti

Significant numbers of Swabians moved to Berlin following the city's reinstatement as German capital in 2000.

By the 2010s, their number was estimated as close to 300,000. As the Swabians in Berlin tended to be wealthier than the local Berliner, this resulted in a gentrification conflict, covered under the term Schwabenhass (literally "hatred of Swabians") by the German press in 2012–2013.

== List of notable Swabians ==
- Frederick Barbarossa (1122–1190), Duke of Swabia and later Holy Roman Emperor
- Albertus Magnus (c. 1200 – 1280), Dominican friar, philosopher, scientist, and bishop
- Eberhard I, Duke of Württemberg (1445–1496), first Duke of Württemberg
- Jakob Fugger (1459–1525), merchant, mining entrepreneur, and banker
- Hans Holbein the Younger (1497/98–1543), painter and printmaker
- Johannes Brenz (1499–1570), theologian and Protestant reformer
- Nikolaus Federmann (c. 1505–1542), conquistador in service of the Spanish Empire, helped re-found the city of Santa Fe de Bogotá
- Johannes Kepler (1571–1630), astronomer, mathematician, and astrologer
- Daniel Mögling (1596–1635), alchemist and Rosicrucian
- Leopold Mozart (1719–1787), composer, violinist, and music theorist, best known as the father and teacher of Wolfgang Amadeus Mozart
- Christoph Martin Wieland (1733–1813), novelist, poet, and translator
- Friedrich Schiller (1759–1805), playwright, poet, philosopher, and historian
- Johann Friedrich Pfaff (1765–1825), mathematician, doctoral advisor of Carl Friedrich Gauss
- Friedrich Hölderlin (1770–1843), poet and philosopher
- Georg Wilhelm Friedrich Hegel (1770–1831), philosopher
- Friedrich Wilhelm Joseph Schelling (1775–1854), philosopher
- Ludwig Aurbacher (1784–1847), teacher and writer, best known for his stories about The Seven Swabians
- Justinus Kerner (1786–1862), poet, physician, and medical writer
- Ludwig Uhland (1787–1862), poet, philologist, and literary historian
- Friedrich Silcher (1789–1860), composer and folksong collector
- Friedrich List (1789–1846), entrepreneur, diplomat, economist, and political theorist
- Christian Friedrich Schönbein (1799–1868), chemist and inventor
- Wilhelm Hauff (1802–1827), novelist
- Eduard Mörike (1804–1875), poet and novelist
- Julius Robert Mayer (1814–1878), physician, chemist, and physicist
- Emanuel Leutze (1816–1868), history painter
- Sebastian Kneipp (1821–1897), Catholic priest and one of the forefathers of the naturopathic movement
- Gottlieb Daimler (1834–1900), engineer, industrial designer, and co-founder of Daimler Motoren Gesellschaft
- Count Ferdinand von Zeppelin (1838–1917), general and later inventor of the Zeppelin rigid airships
- Wilhelm Maybach (1846–1929), engine designer and co-founder of Daimler Motoren Gesellschaft
- Margarete Steiff (1847–1909), founder of Margarete Steiff GmbH
- Ludwig Ganghofer (1855–1920), writer
- Albert Boehringer (1861–1939), chemist, industrialist, and founder of Boehringer Ingelheim
- Robert Bosch (1861–1942), mechanic, inventor, and founder of Robert Bosch GmbH
- Hermann Hesse (1877–1961), novelist, poet, and painter, Nobel laureate in Literature
- Clara Ritter (1877–1959), co-founder of Ritter Sport
- Theodor Heuss (1884–1963), politician, first President of the Federal Republic of Germany (1949–1959)
- Hugo Boss (1885–1948), businessman and founder of Hugo Boss
- Ernst Heinkel (1888–1958), aircraft designer and founder of Heinkel Flugzeugwerke
- Martin Heidegger (1889–1976), philosopher
- Erwin Rommel (1891–1944), field marshal during World War II
- Bertolt Brecht (1898–1956), theatre practitioner, playwright, and poet
- Claus von Stauffenberg (1907–1944), army officer best known for his failed attempt on 20 July 1944 to assassinate Adolf Hitler
- Fritz Leonhardt (1909–1999), structural engineer
- Thaddäus Troll (1914–1980), journalist, writer, and Swabian dialect poet
- Artur Fischer (1919–2016), inventor and company founder
- Richard von Weizsäcker (1920–2015), politician, President of the Federal Republic of Germany (1984–1994)
- Maria Beig (1920–2017), novelist
- Erich Hartmann (1922–1993), fighter ace during World War II
- Gerd Müller (1955–2021), football manager and former player
- Ralf Rangnick (1958–), football manager and former player
- Jürgen Klinsmann (1964–), football manager and former player
- Gert Mittring (1966–), mental calculator
- Jürgen Klopp (1967–), football manager and former player
- Diana Damrau (1971–), soprano opera singer
- Rüdiger Gamm (1971–), mental calculator
- Eva Briegel (1978–), singer and member of the pop group Juli
- Sebastian Griesbeck (1990–), footballer
- Mario Götze (1992–), footballer
- Joshua Kimmich (1995–), footballer
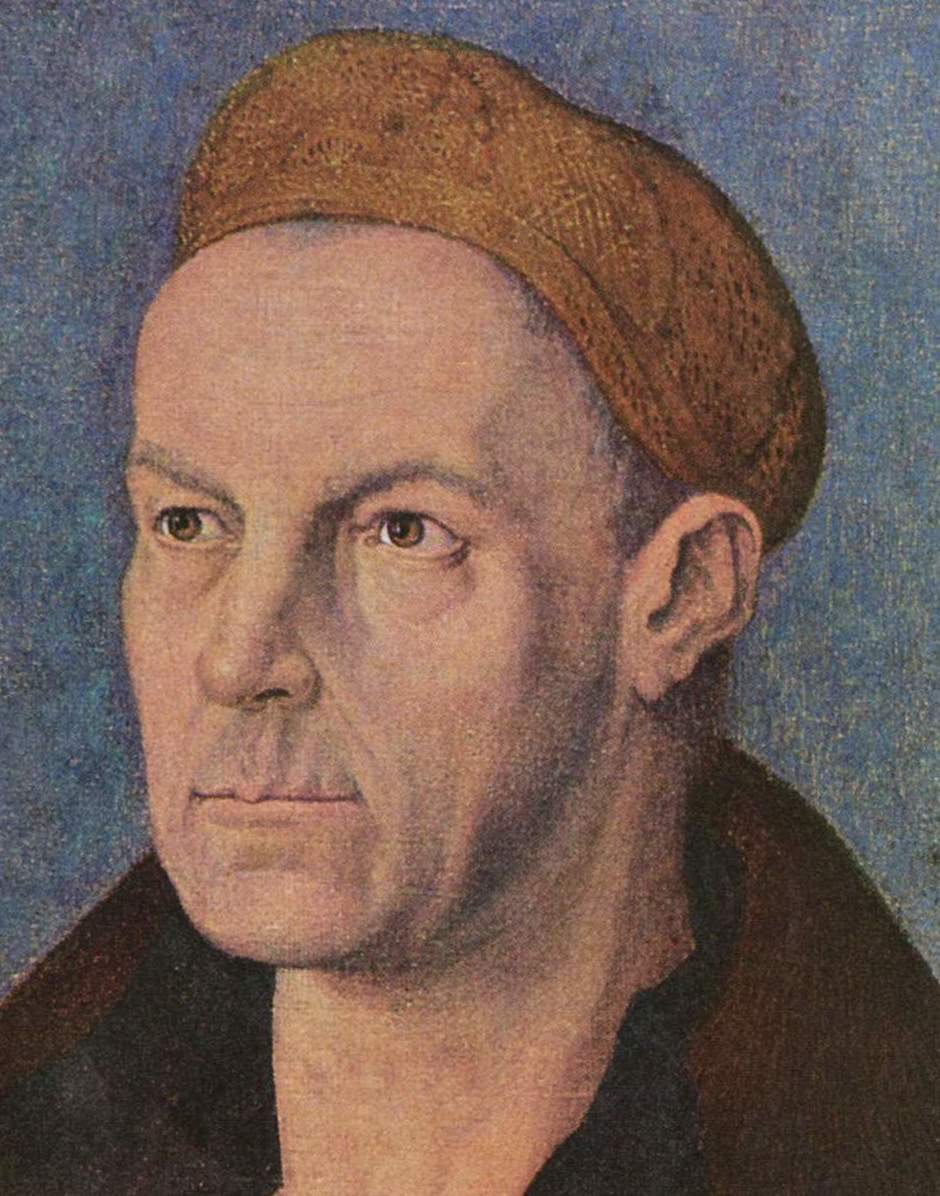
Jakob Fugger

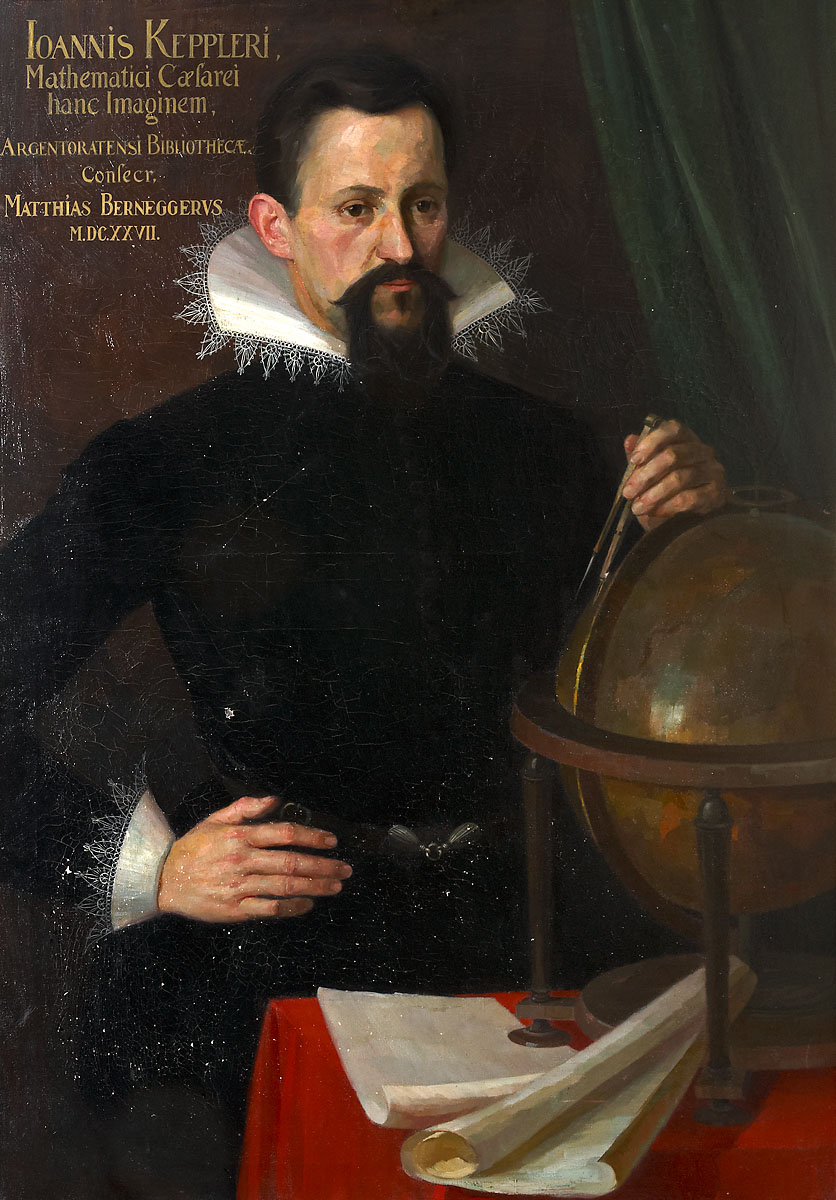
Johannes Kepler

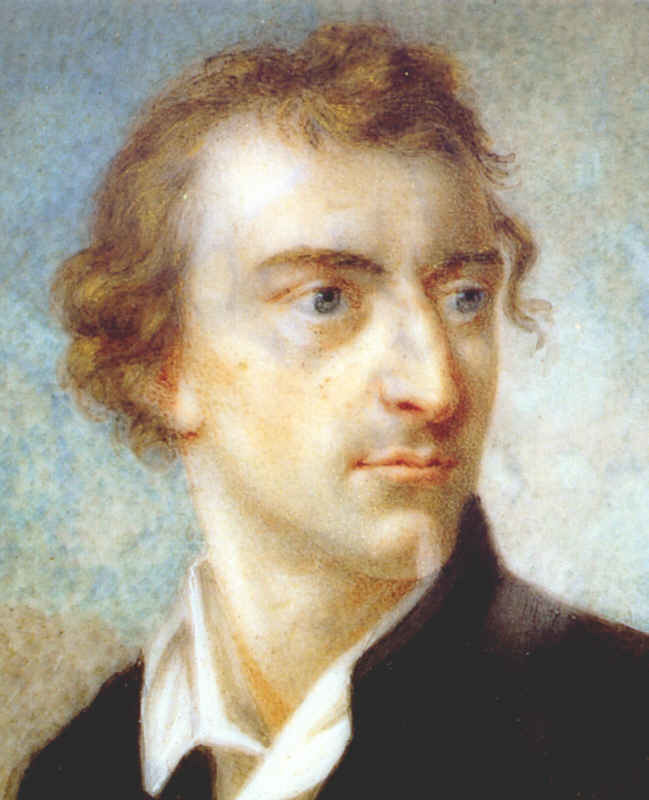
Friedrich Schiller

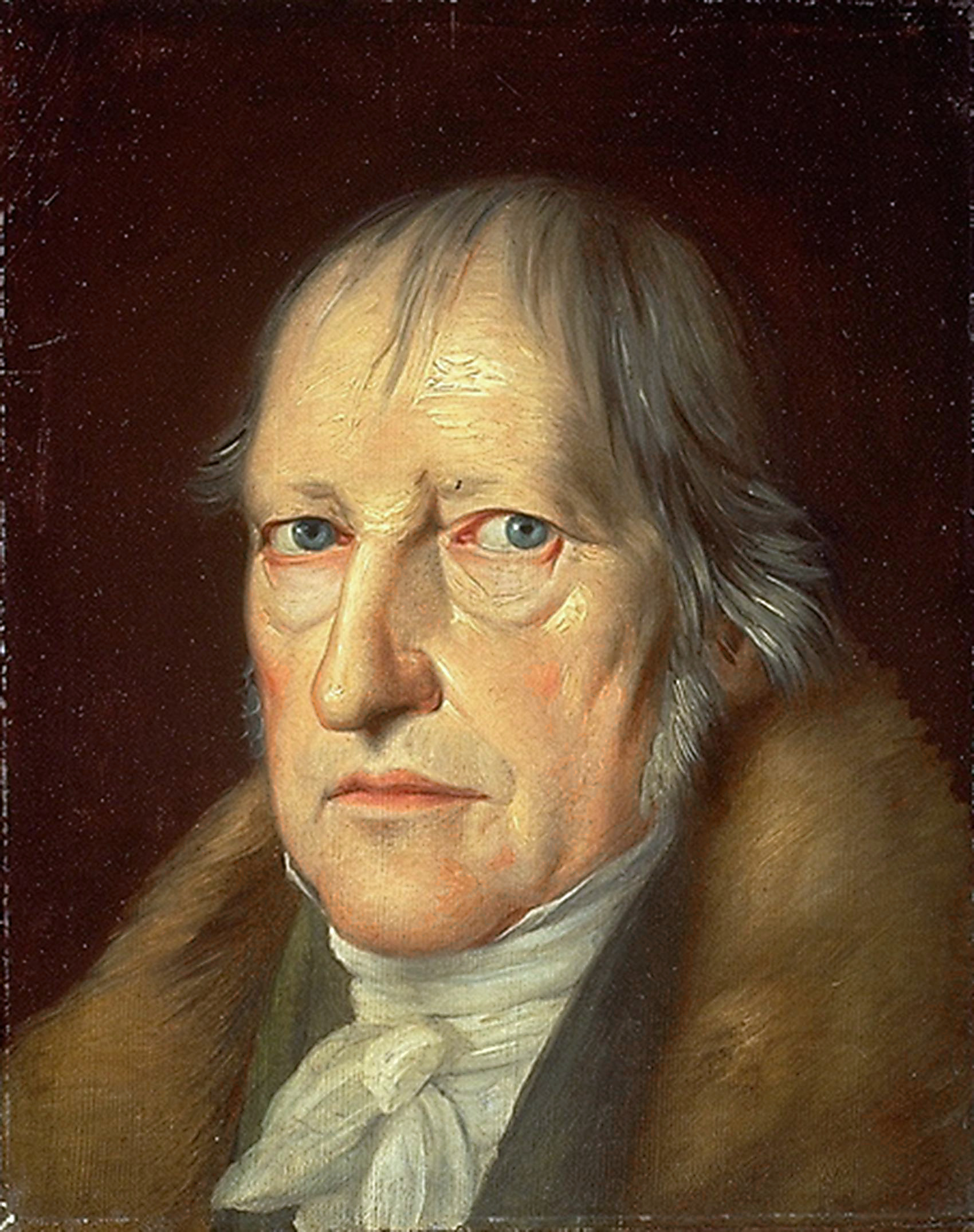
Georg Friedrich Wilhelm Hegel

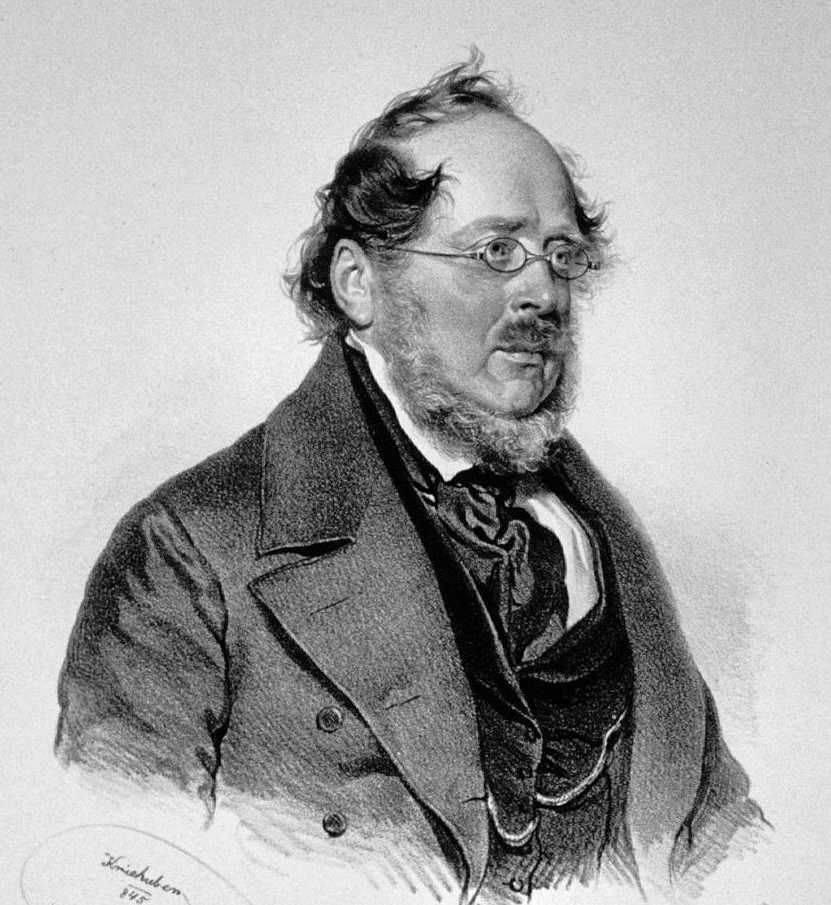
Friedrich List

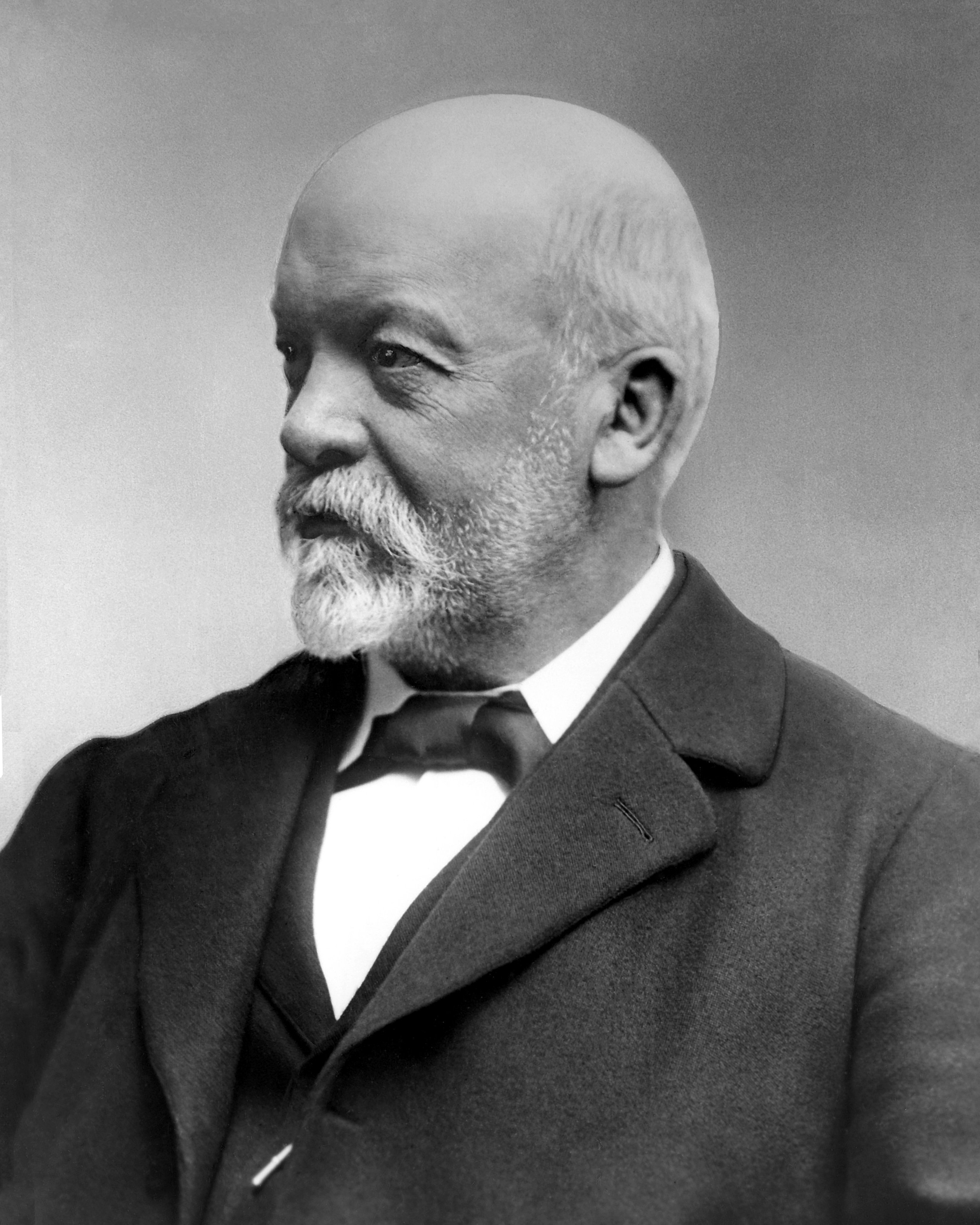
Gottlieb Daimler

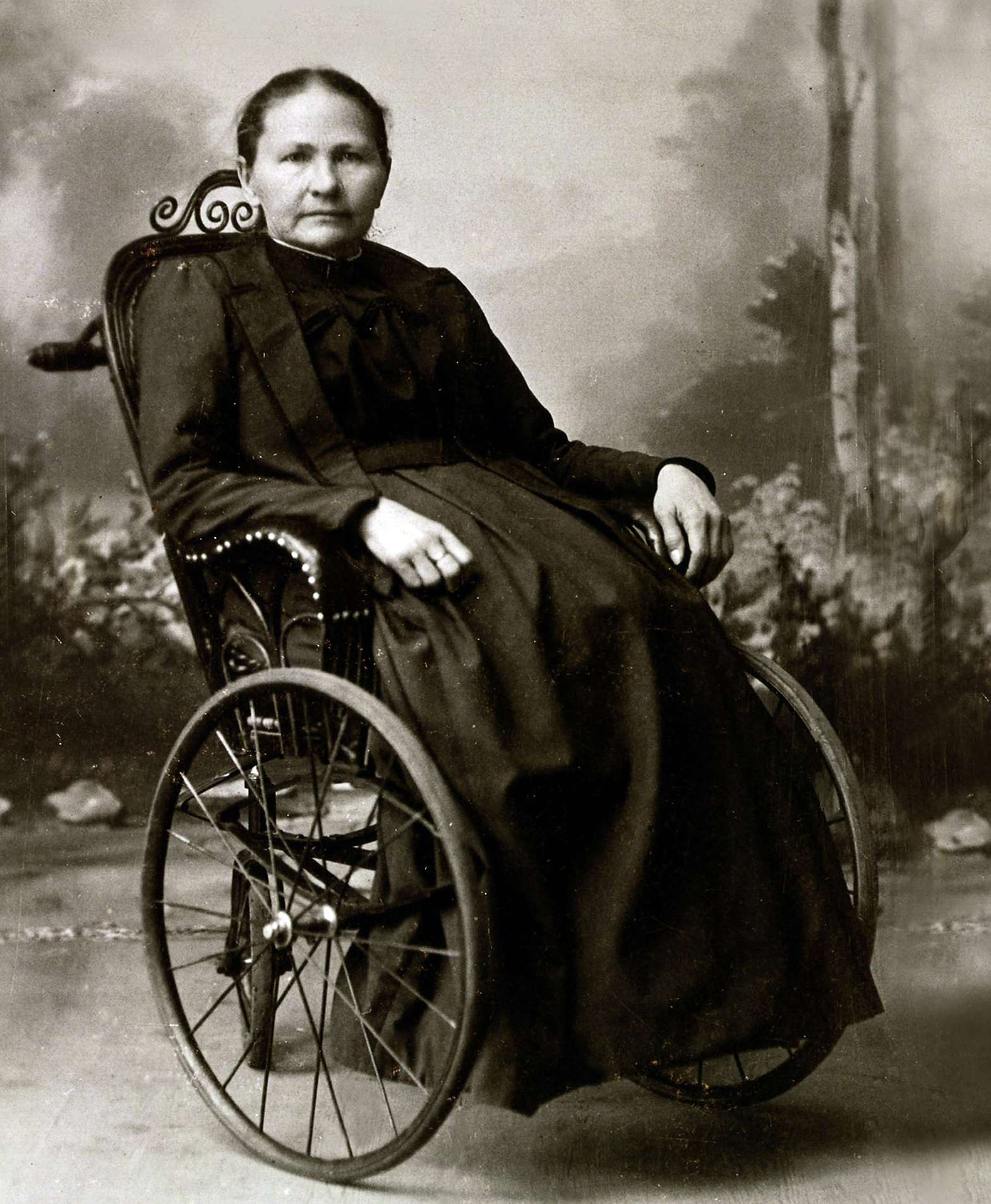
Margarete Steiff

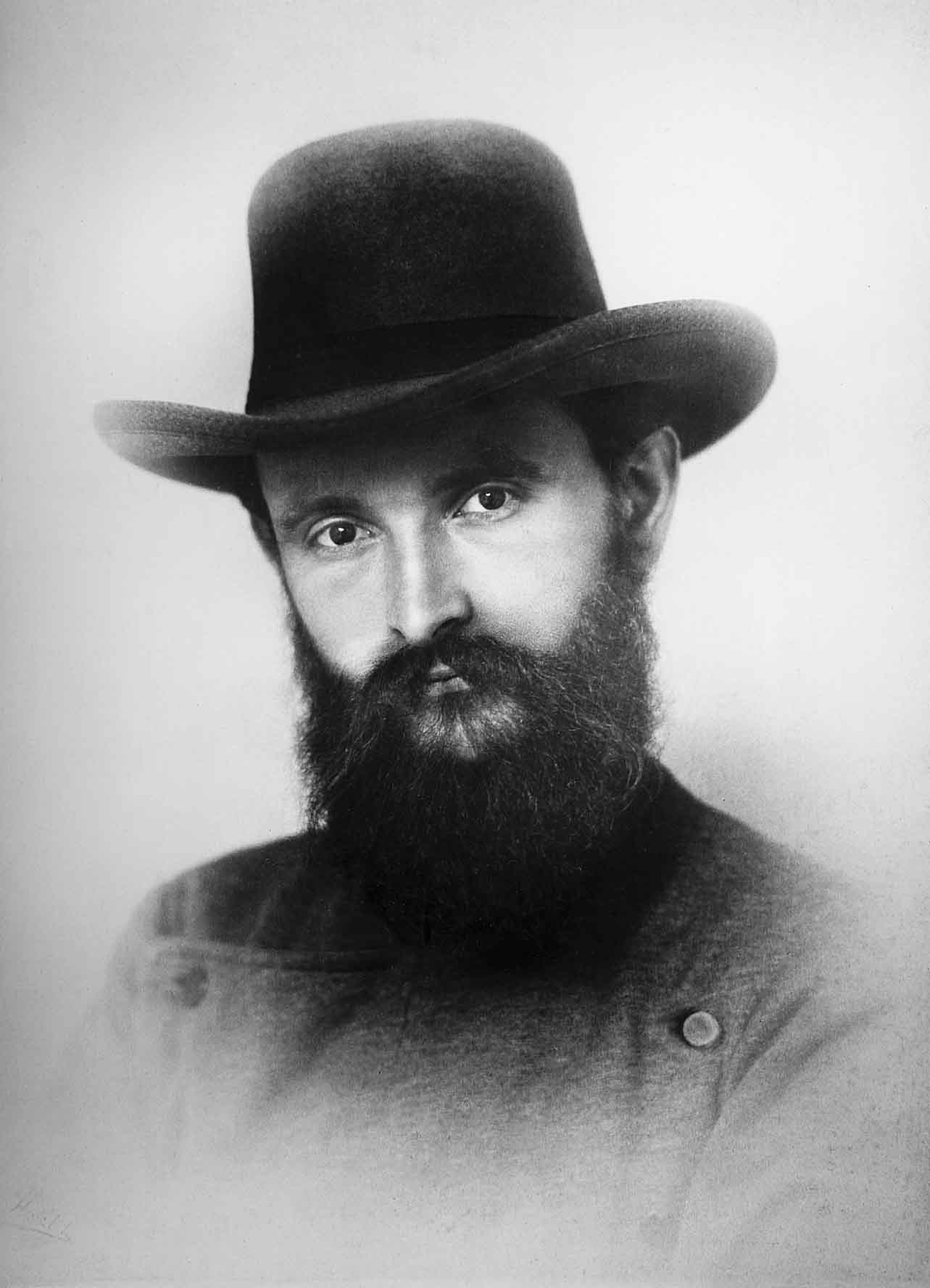
Robert Bosch

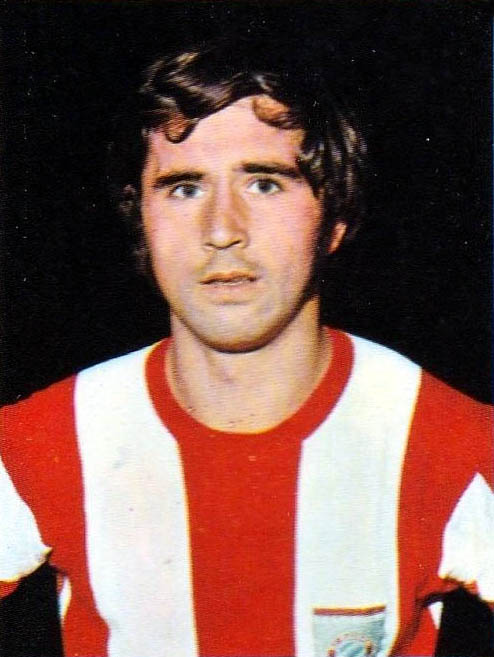
Gerd Müller

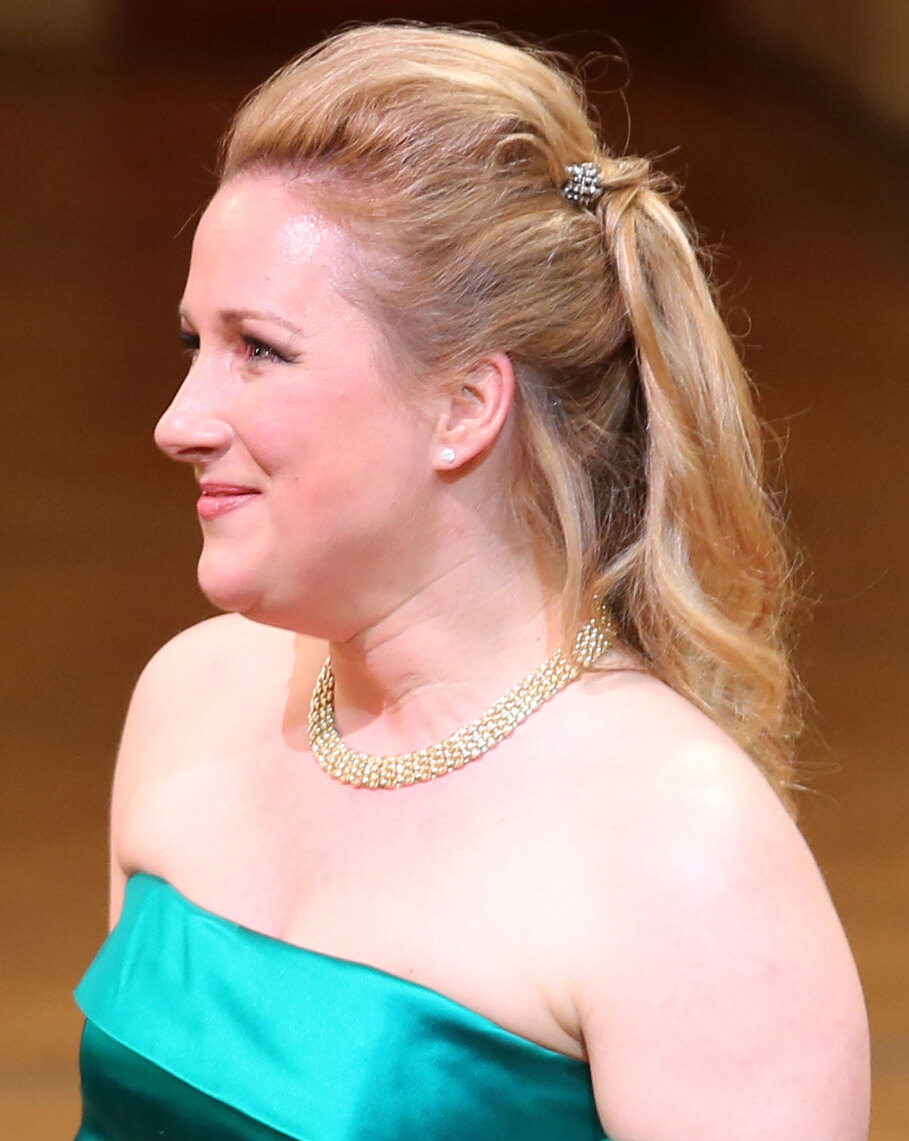
Diana Damrau

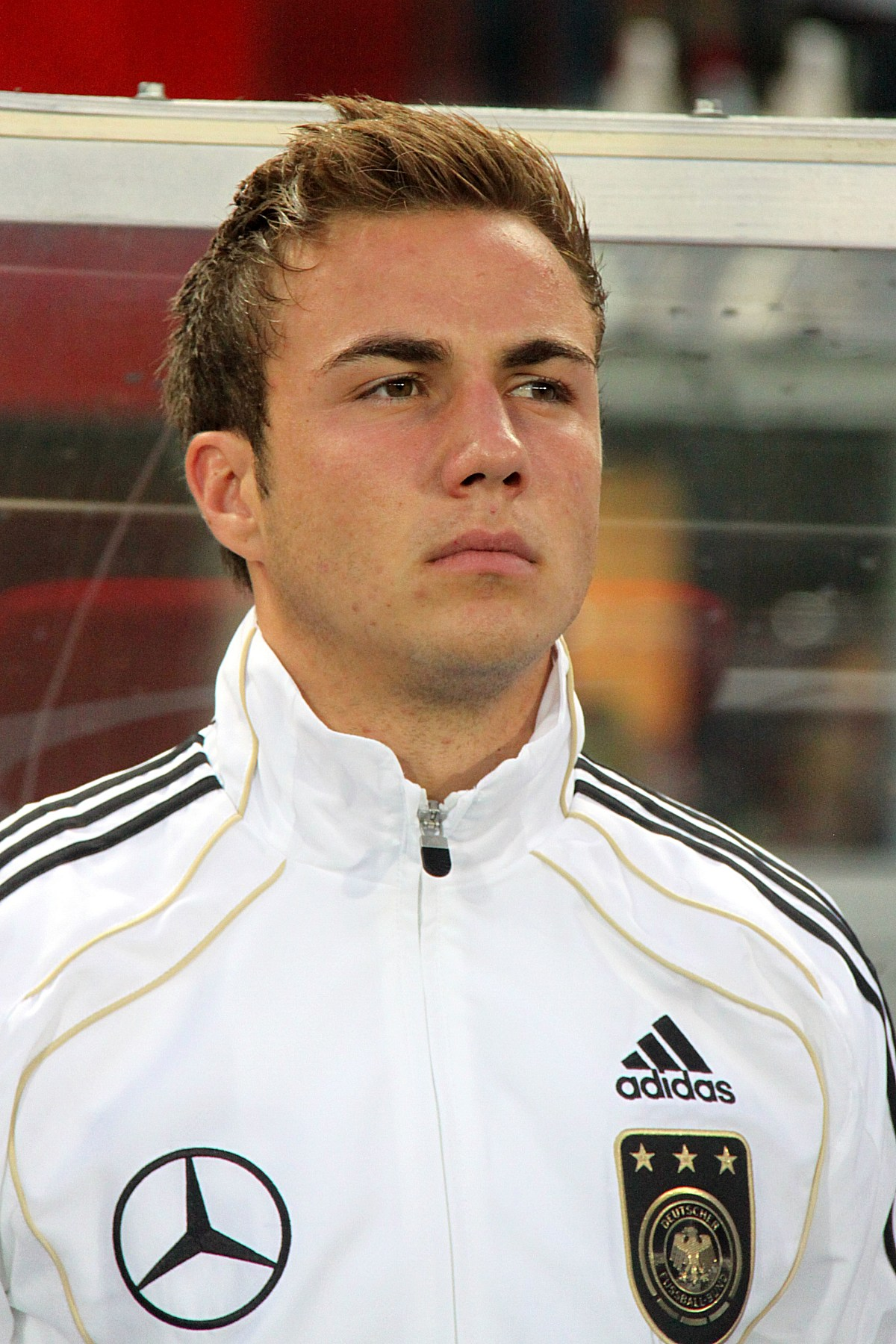
Mario Götze

== See also ==
- Swabian children
- Alsatians
- Bavarians
- Alemannic separatism
- German tribes
