= Western New England University =

Private university in Springfield, Massachusetts, US

- Seal of Western New England University
- Former name: List: Northeastern College, Springfield Division (1919–1922); Northeastern University of the Boston YMCA, Springfield Division (1922–1935); Northeastern University, Springfield Division (1935–1951); Western New England College (1951–2011)
- Motto: Latin: Scientia Integritas Servitium
- Motto in English: Knowledge Integrity Service
- Type: Private university
- Established: 1919; 107 years ago (Note: Then still part of Northeastern University. Separated 1951.)
- Accreditation: NECHE
- Academic affiliations: Cooperating Colleges of Greater Springfield
- Endowment: $60.2 million (2024)
- President: Joseph C. Hartman
- Students: 3,674
- Undergraduates: 2,616
- Postgraduates: 1,058
- Location: Springfield, Massachusetts, U.S. 42.1155°N 72.5197°W
- Campus: 215 acres (87 ha); Suburban
- Colors: Blue & gold
- Nickname: Golden Bears
- Sporting affiliations: NCAA Division III
- Mascot: Spirit
- Website: wne.edu

Western New England University is a private university in Springfield, Massachusetts. Academic programs are provided through its College of Arts and Sciences, College of Business, College of Engineering, School of Law, and College of Pharmacy and Health Sciences.

In recognition of its master's and doctoral programs, the institution officially changed its name from Western New England College to Western New England University on July 1, 2011. This marked the return of "university" to the school's name, exactly 60 years after separating from Northeastern University. It had long been classified as a university.

== History ==
The Springfield Division of Northeastern College, known as Springfield-Northeastern, was established in 1919. Evening classes, held in the YMCA building on Chestnut Street in Springfield for students studying part-time, were offered in law, business, and accounting. In 1922, the school's first 13 students were awarded the degree of Bachelor of Commercial Science. The first seven law graduates were recognized in 1923.

In 1951 the Springfield Division of Northeastern University became Western New England College. The college was chartered on July 17, 1951. On April 26, 1956, 34 acres (140,000 m^{2}) for the current Wilbraham Road campus were purchased. In that same year the first day program was started; it was in engineering, with 53 students enrolled. The first building, originally known as East Building and later renamed Emerson Hall in recognition of the college's first trustee chairman, opened in 1959.

The college's charter was expanded in 1959 to permit the college to grant the bachelor's degree in any field of business administration, science, engineering, education, and law, and certain master's degrees. The charter was expanded in 2005 to include the LL.M. in Estate Planning and Elder Law, and again in 2008 with the inclusion of the Ph.D. in Behavior Analysis.

The School of Arts and Sciences was established in 1967, and the college received accreditation as a general purpose institution in 1972.

The 1960s through the 1990s saw the college's academic programs expanding, its student body growing, and the addition of a number of buildings, including the D’Amour Library, the Blake Law Center, the St. Germain Campus Center, the Alumni Healthful Living Center, and the LaRiviere Living and Learning Center. In 2001, the Evergreen Village townhouses opened for seniors. The Kevin S. Delbridge Welcome Center, which houses the admissions offices, opened in 2002. In 2003, Commonwealth Hall and the Golden Bear Stadium opened. The George Trelease Memorial Baseball Park was completed in 2004. In 2006, the $1.9 million expansion to the D’Amour Library was completed. In 2008 and 2009, respectively, the college expanded and renovated the Blake Law Center and built Southwood Hall. In 2010, the $40 million Center for the Sciences and Pharmacy was completed. Herman Hall underwent an $8 million renovation in 2012.

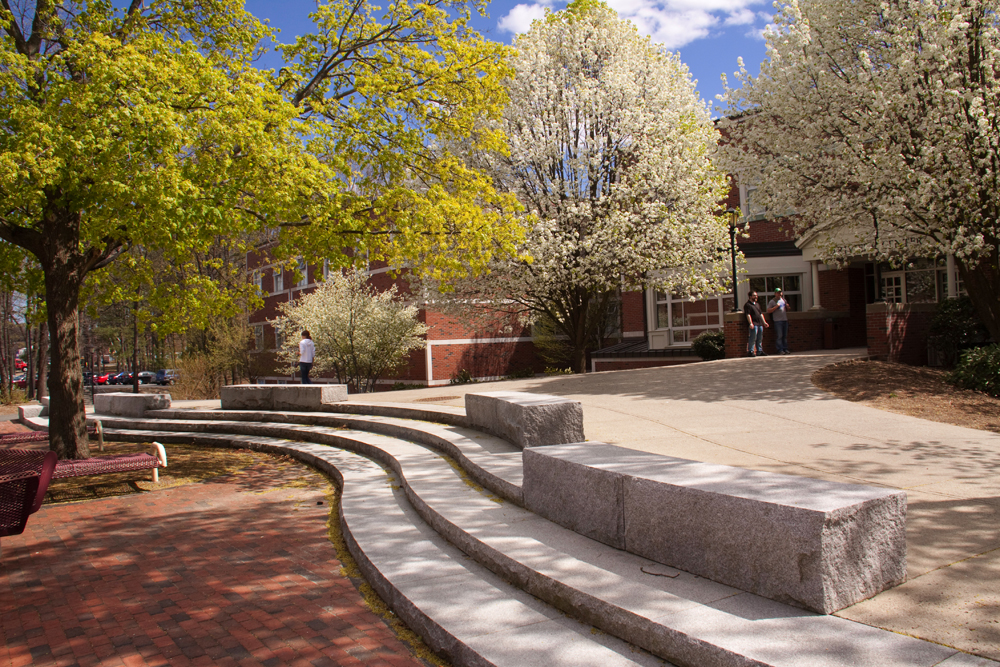
Western New England University campus

The university's 215-acre (0.87 km^{2}) campus serves as home to undergraduate, graduate, doctoral, pharmaceutical, and law students from throughout the United States and abroad. Undergraduate and graduate programs are offered in the Colleges of Arts and Sciences, Business, Engineering, Pharmacy, and at the School of Law. In 2010, the College of Pharmacy was established, and the institution was granted a change to its charter that permits it to offer the degree of Doctor of Pharmacy. Western New England University has 45,000 alumni around the world.

On July 1, 2011, Western New England College officially became Western New England University. The Massachusetts Board of Higher Education approved the name change in March 2011. The Schools of Arts and Sciences, Business, Engineering, and Pharmacy became the Colleges of Arts and Sciences, Business, Engineering, and Pharmacy. The School of Law retained its name.

== Affiliations ==
Western New England University is accredited by the New England Commission of Higher Education. Business programs are accredited by the Association to Advance Collegiate Schools of Business, engineering programs are accredited by the Accreditation Board for Engineering and Technology, and social work programs are accredited by the Council on Social Work Education. The School of Law is accredited by the American Bar Association and is a member of the Association of American Law Schools. Teacher education programs have been approved by the Massachusetts Board of Education and are part of the Interstate Certification Compact. Western New England University is also a member of the Association of American Colleges, the National Association of Independent Colleges and Universities, and the Association of Independent Colleges and Universities of Massachusetts.

== Rankings ==
Academic rankings

National
- U.S. News & World Report: 283 (tie)

In 2025 (2026 Best National Universities List), U.S. News & World Report ranked Western New England University tied for No. 283 out of 436 National Universities, tied for No. 113 out of 286 Best Undergraduate Engineering Programs at schools where a doctorate is not offered, and tied for No. 386 out of 433 Top Performers on Social Mobility.

Western New England University has consistently dropped in its rankings over the past few years. On the Best National Universities List, it was ranked #234 for 2023, #236 for 2024, #273 for 2025, and #283 for 2026.

== Undergraduate admissions ==
In 2024, Western New England University accepted 88% of undergraduate applicants, with admission standards considered challenging, applicant competition considered very low, and with those enrolled having an average 3.49 high school GPA. The college does not require, but will consider, submission of standardized test scores, Western New University being a test optional school. Those enrolled that submitted test scores had an average 1190 SAT score (22% submitting scores) or an average 26 ACT score (1% submitting scores).

== Student life ==
For the 2021–2022 academic year, enrollment at Western New England University was 3,674 students. Full-time undergraduate enrollment totaled 2,522 students; approximately 58 percent are male students and 42 percent female. Law enrollment was 395 students, and part-time undergraduate, graduate studies and adult learners, pharmacy, and occupational therapy enrollment totaled 731.

=== Athletics ===
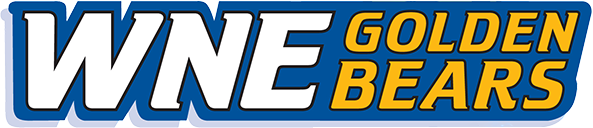
WNE Golden Bears wordmark

WNEU athletics teams (nicknamed the Golden Bears) participate in 14 sports programs, competing in the Conference of New England of NCAA Division III. Western New England's teams include men's and women's basketball, cross country, lacrosse, ice hockey, outdoor track and field, soccer, tennis, and wrestling.

Men's sports include baseball and football while women's sports include field hockey, softball, swimming, and volleyball.

== Notable persons ==
=== Alumni ===
Western New England University has 43,000 alumni. The Western New England University School of Law has more than 7,000 alumni, while the MBA and MSA programs have nearly 6,000 alumni. The general University alumni magazine used to be called The Communicator. The School of Law alumni magazine is called Perspectives. A new magazine launched in 2019 called WNE: The Magazine of Western New England University.

=== Notable alumni ===
- John Joseph Bell, Air Force officer and member of the Virginia House of Delegates
- Nicholas Boldyga - member of the Massachusetts House of Representatives (served 2011–present)
- Thomas G. Bowman JD - American political aide and retired Marine Corps Colonel who served as the United States Deputy Secretary of Veterans Affairs from August 10, 2017, to June 15, 2018
- Stephen Buoniconti JD'95 - former member of the Massachusetts Senate (served 2005–2011) and former member of the Massachusetts House of Representatives (served 2001 – 2004).
- Lawrence F. Cafero JD'81 - member of Connecticut House of Representatives and Republican House Leader.
- Gale D. Candaras JD'82 - member of the Massachusetts Senate (served 2007–present) and former member of the Massachusetts House of Representatives (served 1996 – 2006).
- Michael A. Christ JD'02 - former Deputy Majority Leader of Connecticut House of Representatives.
- Cheryl A. Coakley-Rivera JD'95, member of the Massachusetts House of Representatives (served 1999–present).
- Michael Charles Green JD'86 - District Attorney for Monroe County, New York
- Curt Hawkins - WWE Wrestler (Did not graduate)
- Anthony Katagas - Academy Award-winning producer of 12 Years A Slave.
- Daniel F. Keenan JD - former member of the Massachusetts House of Representatives (served 1995–2007)
- John Kissel JD'84 - member of the Connecticut State Senate.
- Michael Mori JD'94 - U.S. Marine Corps lawyer.
- Thomas S. Moorman Jr. MBA'72 - served as Vice Chief of Staff of the United States Air Force.
- Tim Murray JD'94 - former Lieutenant Governor of Massachusetts and former Mayor of Worcester, Massachusetts.
- Larry O'Brien '42 - Chairman of the Democratic National Committee during the Watergate break-in, former National Basketball Association Commissioner, and former U.S. Postmaster General (then a Cabinet position). O'Brien was campaign manager for John F. Kennedy, Robert F. Kennedy, Lyndon B. Johnson, Hubert Humphrey, George McGovern, and Foster Furcolo. Namesake of the Smithsonian Institution's O'Brien Gallery in Washington, DC and the Lawrence O'Brien Award.
- Thomas Petrolati - member of the Massachusetts House of Representatives (served 1987–present)
- Angelo Puppolo JD'01 - member of the Massachusetts House of Representatives (served 2007–present) and former City Councilor in the city of Springfield, Massachusetts
- Joseph Rallo JD'76 - president of Angelo State University.
- Regina Rush-Kittle MS'97 - past deputy commissioner, Connecticut State Division of Emergency Management and Homeland Security
- Rodney Smith - bronze medal winner in the 68-kg division of the Greco-Roman wrestling competition at the 1992 Olympic Games and also competed in the 1996 Olympic Games
- Thomas L. Stevenson JD'77 - former member of the Pennsylvania House of Representatives (served 1997–2006)
- John E. Sweeney JD'91 - former member of the U.S. House of Representatives from upstate New York and noted conservative legislator
- Tommy Tallarico - video game music composer and musician
- Joseph Wagner - former member of the Massachusetts House of Representatives (served 1991 – 2023)

=== Notable faculty and staff ===
- Pearl Abraham - assistant professor of English and an American novelist, essayist, and short story writer who has written four novels: The Romance Reader, Giving Up America, The Seventh Beggar, and American Taliban
- Anthony S. Caprio - president emeritus of Western New England University and a French language scholar
- Charles Clason - former dean of the School of Law, former member of the House of Representatives from Massachusetts from 1937 to 1949, and namesake of the School of Law's Clason Speaker Series
- Julie Croteau - former baseball assistant coach after she was the first woman to play men's NCAA baseball at St. Mary's College of Maryland
- Stephen Danbusky - former men's soccer assistant coach and former professional soccer player
- Jean Marie Higiro - associate professor of communication and former director of the Rwandan Information Office (ORINFOR), a government corporation that run Radio Rwanda, Rwandan Television and state controlled media in the Republic of Rwanda
- Tom Hull - associate professor of mathematics and expert in the mathematics of paper folding
- Chris Iijima - former professor and Asian American folksinger, educator and legal scholar
- Linda Jones - professor of materials science and engineering
- Barbara Lenk - trustee and associate justice of the Massachusetts Supreme Judicial Court
- Joan Mahoney - former dean of the School of Law and former dean of Wayne State University Law School
- Michael Meeropol - former economics professor, eldest son of Ethel and Julius Rosenberg, and the author of SURRENDER: How the Clinton Administration Completed the Reagan Revolution
- Robert Meeropol former anthropology professor from 1971 to 1973 and son of Ethel and Julius Rosenberg. Founder of the Rosenberg Fund for Children
- Richard Muhlberger - former professor of art history, former vice-director of New York's Metropolitan Museum of Art, and an American art critic. Also author of numerous art titles including: What makes a Rembrandt a Rembrandt?, What makes a Raphael a Raphael?, What makes a Bruegel a Bruegel?, What makes a Degas a Degas?, Bible in Art: The Old Testament, Bible in Art: The New Testament, and Charles Webster Hawthorne: Paintings and Watercolors.
- Anibál Nieves - former head wrestling coach and wrestler representing Puerto Rico in the 1992 and 1996 Olympics and two-time silver medalist at the Pan American Games
