= Linda Jones (engineer) =

Engineering professor (born 1958)

- Born: September 12, 1958
- Education: Pennsylvania State University
- Scientific career
- Thesis: The effect of boron on carbon fiber microstructure and reactivity (1987)

Linda Ellen Jones is an academic in the field of chemical engineering, and known for her work in high temperature chemistry. She is a professor at Western New England University and an elected fellow of the American Ceramic Society.

== Education and career ==
Jones has a bachelor's degree in chemistry from Mary Washington College (1980) and then moved to Pennsylvania State University where she earned her master's (1984) and doctoral degrees. She also worked at Atlantic Research Corporation serving as materials engineer and chemist. In 1991, Jones joined the faculty at Alfred University, where she was promoted to professor in 2001.

In 2005, Jones moved to Smith College where she was the Rosemary Bradford Hewlett ’40 Professor of Engineering at Smith College, and was the director of the college's engineering program. While at Smith, Jones worked to integrate engineering students with non-science majors.

Jones subsequently moved back to Alfred University, and from 2010 to 2014, she was the first woman to serve as Vice President and Head of the New York State College of Ceramics. She served as Provost and Vice President of Academic Affairs from 2014 to 2020 at Western New England University. As of 2021, she is a professor of materials science and engineering at Western New England University.

She has a patent for improving plasticizers needed for solid propellants.

== Selected publications ==
- Jones, L.E; Thrower, P.A (1991). "Influence of boron on carbon fiber microstructure, physical properties, and oxidation behavior". Carbon. 29 (2): 251–269. Bibcode:1991Carbo..29..251J. doi:10.1016/0008-6223(91)90076-U.
- Hach, Charles T; E. Jones, Linda; Crossland, Carl; Thrower, Peter A (1999). "An investigation of vapor deposited boron rich carbon–a novel graphite-like material–part I: the structure of BCx (C6B) thin films". Carbon. 37 (2): 221–230. doi:10.1016/S0008-6223(98)00166-3.
- Howe, J. Y.; Rawn, C. J.; Jones, L. E.; Ow, H. (2003). "Improved crystallographic data for graphite". Powder Diffraction. 18 (2): 150–154. Bibcode:2003PDiff..18..150H. doi:10.1154/1.1536926. ISSN 0885-7156. S2CID 95405722.
- Rohrer, Gregory S.; Affatigato, Mario; Backhaus, Monika; Bordia, Rajendra K.; Chan, Helen M.; Curtarolo, Stefano; Demkov, Alex; Eckstein, James N.; Faber, Katherine T.; Garay, Javier E.; Gogotsi, Yury (2012). "Challenges in Ceramic Science: A Report from the Workshop on Emerging Research Areas in Ceramic Science". Journal of the American Ceramic Society. 95 (12): 3699–3712. doi:10.1111/jace.12033. ISSN 1551-2916.

== Honors and awards ==
From 1996 to 1997, Jones was the Graffin lecturer of the American Carbon Society. In 2008, Jones was named a fellow of the American Ceramic Society, and delivered the McMahon lecture at Alfred University. In 2013 she received the Outstanding Educator Award from the American Ceramic Society. Jones was profiled in the 2016 book on successful women in ceramic and glass science. In 2021, Jones was named one of the University of Pennsylvania's 125th Anniversary Fellows.
