= Anthony S. Caprio =

American academic administrator and scholar

Anthony S. Caprio is a French language scholar. He was the fifth president of Western New England University, succeeding Beverly Miller in 1996. He was succeeded in 2020 by Robert E. Johnson.

Caprio is a member of Omicron Delta Kappa, Phi Beta Kappa, and the law school accreditation committee of the American Bar Association.

== Education and career ==
Caprio received the B.A. degree in 1967 from Wesleyan University, where he was named to Phi Beta Kappa, the M.A. from Columbia University in 1969, and the Ph.D. from Columbia University in 1973. He undertook his studies also in Paris. He was awarded the honorary bachelor's degree from Western New England University in 2000.

Since 1973, he has worked as a teacher and administrator in a wide range of institutions, both private and public. Prior to his appointment as President of Western New England University, Caprio served for seven years as provost and professor of language and literature at Oglethorpe University in Atlanta where he was responsible as chief academic officer for all matters related to faculty and to undergraduate and graduate curriculum. Caprio led the development of the university's strategic plan and its subsequent implementation, including the innovative integration of the institution's liberal arts curriculum within its urban setting. His efforts with regard to internationalization of the University resulted in numerous exchange agreements with universities in Europe, Japan, and South America.

Before joining Oglethorpe University, Caprio held administrative and faculty positions at several institutions. From 1980-1989, he was professor and administrator at American University in Washington, D.C. where he was responsible for faculty and staff in languages and literatures, area and foreign studies, linguistics, and English as a second language. He helped establish study abroad centers in Poland and in Argentina with the American University World Capitals Program, held academic program oversight of American University in Rome, and developed interdisciplinary undergraduate and graduate programs with other units of the University. At American University he was recognized with the Administrator-Faculty Award for Outstanding Performance. Prior to American University, he served at Cedar Crest College in Pennsylvania and Lehman College of the City University of New York.

Caprio has published two books in the areas of language and literature, including Reflets de la Femme (1973) and the college textbook French for Communication (1985). These books are no longer in print.

== Western New England University presidency ==
Caprio was selected by a unanimous vote of the board of trustees in June 1996, after a seven-month national search. He began his tenure as president on September 1, 1996. He presided over an era of change and growth at Western New England University. Several major building projects (Commonwealth Hall, LaRiviere Hall, the S. Prestley Blake Law Center expansion, Golden Bear Stadium, the St. Germain Campus Center renovation, the Kevin S. Delbridge Welcome Center, the George E. Trelease Memorial Baseball Park, Southwood Hall, and the Center for the Sciences and Pharmacy, and the new Dining Hall) were completed during his tenure. Many of these projects were made possible through the Transformations: The Campaign for Western New England College, a $23 million capital campaign.

Caprio spearheaded the creation of the Western New England University College of Pharmacy, the first new college at the university in 41 years. Complementing the College of Pharmacy is a new Center for the Science and Pharmacy. This 126,000-square-foot (11,700 m^{2}), $40 million addition to campus houses the administrative functions of the College of Pharmacy, classrooms, and laboratories supporting the College of Pharmacy and all science programs at the university. It was the largest building project in the history of the university.

Enrollment and academic qualifications of new students also increased during Caprio's administration. Full-time undergraduate enrollment was 2,456 students for the 2007-08 academic year, a 19.2 percent increase since the 2001-02 academic year. Additionally, the School of Law saw a 29.4 percent increase in total enrollment in the same period.

Tuition and fees increased during his tenure. However, the proportion of student tuition and fees discounted through grant aid also increased. The campaign is providing for 79 scholarships.

Preceded by Beverly Miller	President of Western New England University; 1996-2020	Succeeded by Robert E. Johnson
