= Mühlberg =

Mühlberg may refer to:

== Places ==
- Mühlberg, Brandenburg, a town in the Elbe-Elster district, Brandenburg
- Mühlberg, Thuringia, a village in the Gotha district, Thuringia
- Mühlberg (Neustadt an der Waldnaab), a quarter of the town Neustadt an der Waldnaab, Bavaria
- Frankfurt Mühlberg station, a S-Bahn station in Frankfurt am Main
- several hills and mountains are named Mühlberg

== Other uses ==
- the Battle of Mühlberg, which took in place near Mühlberg, Brandenburg, in 1547
- Georg Mühlberg (1863–1925), German painter
