= Sebastian Sailer =

German writer

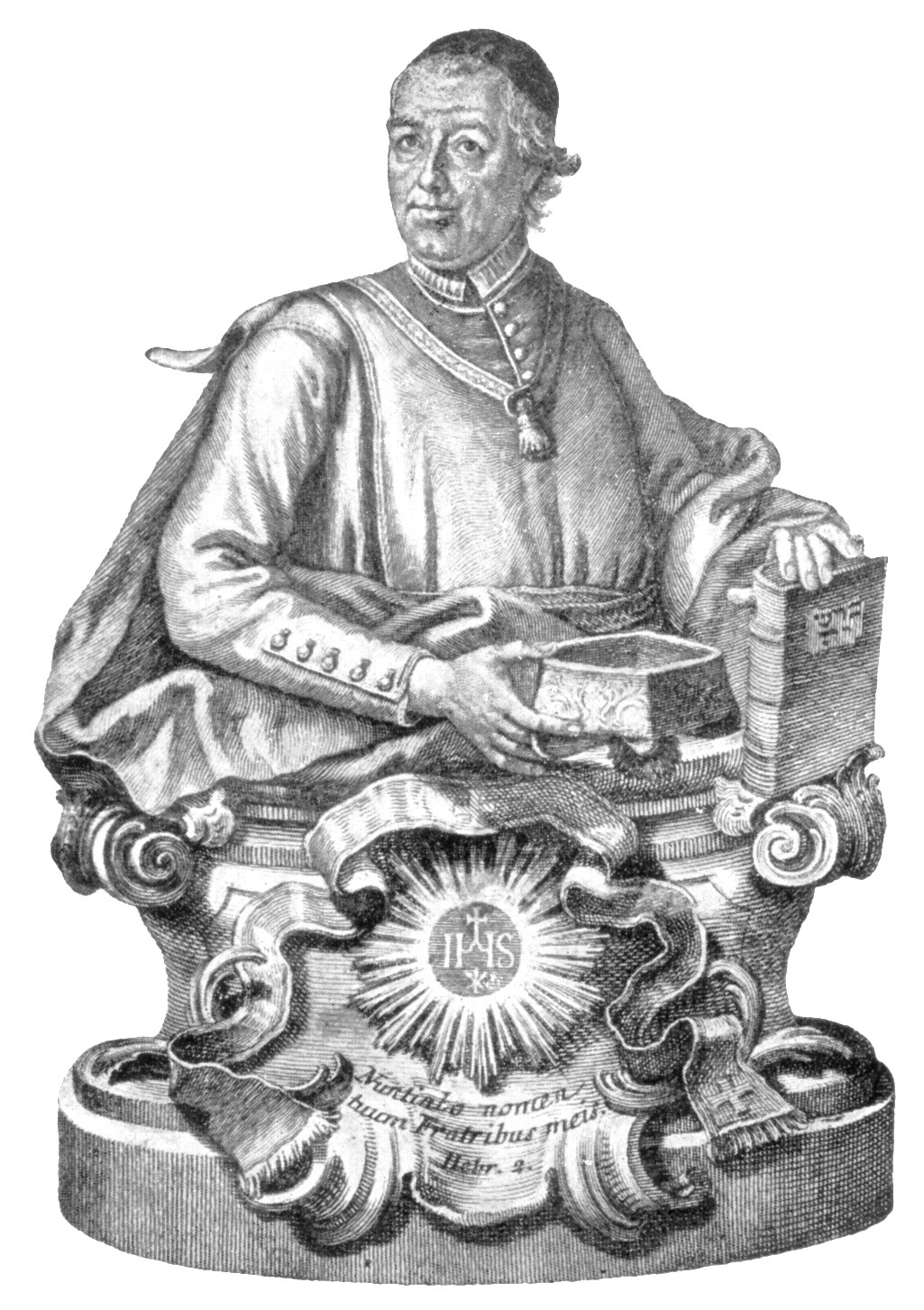
Portrait of Sebastian Sailer, by Gottfried Bernhard Göz

Sebastian Sailer (12 February 1714 in Weißenhorn – 7 March 1777 in Obermarchtal), born Johann Valentin Sailer, was a German Premonstratensian Baroque preacher and writer. He is especially known for his comedies written in Swabian German.

== Writings ==
=== Works written in dialect ===
Sailer's Swabian dialect is that of his hometown Weißenhorn (in what is now Bavarian Swabia) with influences by the hefty rural dialect of his Upper Swabian parishes.

- Schöpfung der ersten Menschen, der Sündenfall und dessen Strafe (Creation of the First Men, the Fall of Mankind and its Punishment, commonly referred to as Die Schwäbische Schöpfung, i. e. The Swabian Creation), musical comedy, 1743
- Der Fall Luzifers (The Fall of Lucifer), musical comedy, after 1738
- Die sieben Schwaben, oder: Die Hasenjagd (The Seven Swabians, or The Hunting of the Hare), comedy, c. 1756
- Beste Gesinnungen Schwäbischer Herzen (Best Dispositions of Swabian Hearts), cantata, 1770
- Die Schultheißenwahl zu Limmelsdorf (The Mayoral Election at Limmelsdorf), play, 1770
- Die schwäbischen heiligen drei Könige (The Swabian Three Magi), comedy, 1771
- Bauernhochzeit (Peasant Wedding), ballad
- Peter als Gott Vater (Peter as God the Father), ballad
- various occasional musical comedies containing Latin, standard German and dialect passages

=== Theological and historical works ===
- Vier Sendschreiben wider H. P. Aug. Dornblüth (Four Epistles against H. P. Aug. Dornblüth), published under the pseudonym Benastasii Liares, 1755-1756
- Das Marianische Orakel (The Marian Oracle), meditations, 1763
- Kempensis Marianus, Latin meditations, 1764
- Geistliche Reden (Theological Speeches), three volumes, 1766-1770
- Das jubilierende Marchtall (Jubilant Marchtal), a history of the monastery of Obermarchtal, 1771
- Geistliche Schaubühne („Spiritual Playhouse“), texts for oratorios, 1774
