= Pearl Abraham =

American novelist, essayist and short story writer

- Born: 1960 (age 65–66); Jerusalem
- Education: Hunter College; Masters of Fine Arts in Creative Writing from New York University
- Occupations: novelist, essayist and short story writer
- Writing career
- Genre: fiction
- Notable work: The Romance Reader, Giving Up America, The Seventh Beggar, American Taliban.
- Notable awards: "Hasidic Noir" won the 2006 Shamus Award for Best Short Story about a Private Eye; "The Romance Reader" was named "Best Book of 1995" by Library Journal
- Website: pearlabraham.com

Pearl Abraham (born 1960 in Jerusalem, Israel) is an American novelist, essayist and short story writer. She was the third of nine children in a Hasidic family. Her father was a rabbi. At age five, the family moved to New York City and two years later returned to Israel. Following several moves back and forth between New York and Israel, the family settled in New York when she was 12. She studied first in Yiddish, then in English and then again in Yiddish.

== Education and teaching career ==
She graduated from Hunter College and received her Masters of Fine Arts in Creative Writing from New York University. She is currently Assistant Professor in the English Department at Western New England University where she teaches creative writing and fiction. She previously taught at New York University, Sarah Lawrence College and the University of Houston.

== Authorship ==
Abraham is the author of four novels: The Romance Reader, Giving Up America, The Seventh Beggar and her latest novel, American Taliban.

In each of her novels, Ms. Abraham has explored the themes of emotional evolution, awakening and becoming. She has described her work as seeking to understand "the mystery of creation, call it talent, the muse, or the heightened mystical moments in which inspiration flows."

The main characters in the Seventh Beggar are a young student who becomes captivated by and ultimately obsessed with Kabbalistic thought and his nephew, a student at MIT, who is steeped in computer science and the creative power of artificial intelligence. While the novel is set in the present, in the background throughout is the 18th century Hasidic master, mystic and storyteller Rabbi Nachman of Bratslav. Regarding the Seventh Beggar, Harold Bloom, Yale University Professor and literary critic wrote: "The Seventh Beggar is an amazingly poignant completion of the most enigmatic of Nachman of Bratslav’s tales. Rabbi Nachman listened for God's voice in the void and was frighteningly honest as to how difficult it was to apprehend redemption. By a kind of miracle of sympathetic imagination, Pearl Abraham has been able to revivify what may be the most spiritually disturbing of all Chasidic tales."

In her review of Giving Up America in the San Francisco Chronicle, Christina Buchmann wrote: "Whether one is falling in love or out of it, the transition is mysterious. Giving Up America, the story of a young couple in New York whose marriage begins changing for the worse, does full justice to that mystery. The book's marriage may end in divorce, but in the meantime Pearl Abraham has given us so many interesting reflections on marriage that the result is invigorating rather than depressing." The Romance Reader tells the story of a young Hasidic woman confronting the challenges of growing up in the face of a stringently imposed orthodoxy. A New York Times review described it as "an assured, smoothly written book, narrated in a muted voice that seems to whisper secrets into the reader's ear."

American Taliban, Abraham's newest novel, tells the story of a young surfer/skater on "an American spiritual journey that begins with Transcendentalism and countercultural impulses, enters into world mysticism, and finds its destination in Islam."

In addition to Abraham's novels, she has been published in Moment Magazine and The New York Times.

== Awards and honors ==
She is also the editor of the Dutch anthology Een Sterke Vrouw: Jewish Heroines in Literature. Her stories and essays have appeared in literary quarterlies and anthologies, including: Who We Are (Schocken Books), The Michigan Quarterly, The Forward, Epoch (Cornell), and Brooklyn Noir (Akashic Press). The Seventh Beggar was one of three finalists for the 2006 Koret Jewish Book Award in Fiction. The Romance Reader was a semifinalist for The Discover New Writer's Award, named "Best Book of 1995" by Library Journal, and selected as first title by Contra Costa Times of San Francisco. It was also on bestseller lists in Germany and the Netherlands. Her story "Hasidic Noir" won the 2006 Shamus Award for Best Short Story about a Private Eye.
