= Schwabenhass =

German phrase

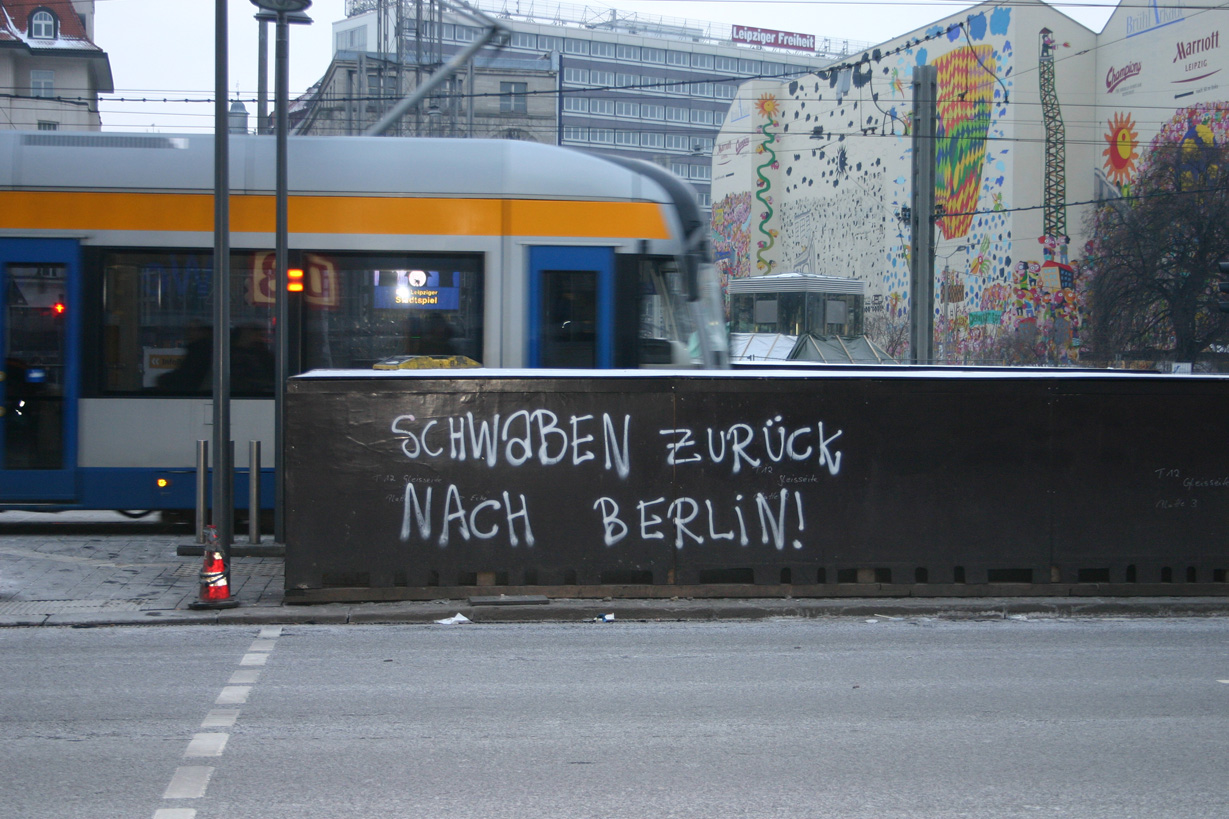
Graffiti in Leipzig: "Swabians [go] back to Berlin!"

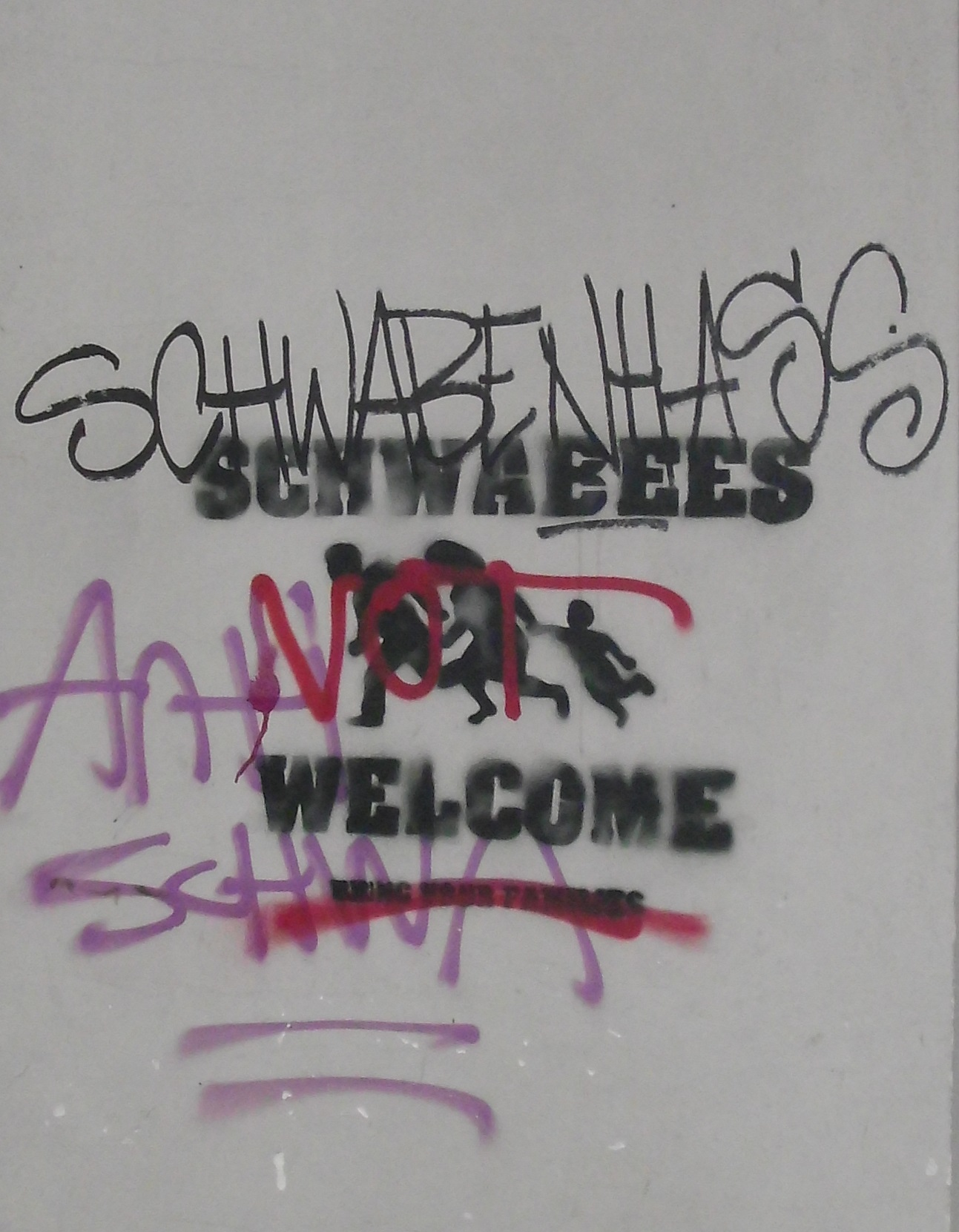
Graffiti in Berlin-Prenzlauer Berg on the wall of a "Swabian Bakery" parodying the popular pro-refugee "Refugees Welcome" graphic

Schwabenhass (German for hatred against Swabians) is a neologism referring to the aversion to the approximately 300,000-strong Swabian diaspora in Berlin and elsewhere in Germany outside of Swabia. In 2013, the so-called Spätzle-streit gained nationwide attention.

== Historical background ==
Anti-Swabian sentiment occurs in different ethnic groups in Germany. The people of Baden, who live immediately west of Swabia and share with them the state of Baden-Württemberg, have a tradition of rivalry with their eastern neighbors. According to the notion, we have nothing against Swabians, at least nothing with sustainable remedy effect. Theodor Fontane states in his 1895 novel Effi Briest that Swabians were a reason to move away from certain neighborhoods in Berlin.

The terms Schwob and Szwab have been used by German Swiss and Poles respectively as an ethnic slur for all Germans. Similar prejudices applied to the Donauschwaben in Hungary despising everything German. "Švabe" is a derogatory term for all Germans in modern Serbo-Croatian.

== Role in gentrification ==
Berlin was not accustomed to gentrification and went through a rather quick modernization process after 1989. Swabians were being deemed as gentrification drivers. “Schwaben” as a term is being used as a synonym for all sorts of well-to-do west German immigrants.

There have been cases of arson e.g. on expensive buggies and trendy cars.

Jan Fleischhauer saw "Schwaben-Hass" as a politically correct variant of xenophobia for left-wing intellectuals hiding otherwise totally unacceptable political positions against foreign infiltration or domination by immigrants.

Prenzlauer Berg slogans included snowclones such as „Schwaben töten“ (Kill Swabians), „Wir sind ein Volk. Und ihr seid ein anderes“ (We're one people. And you are another.) or „Ostberlin wünscht dir eine gute Heimfahrt“ (East Berlin wishes you a good trip home). The police started acting after „Kauft nicht bei Schwab'n“ (don't buy Swabian, a snowclone on a well-known antisemitic motto) was used as graffiti in Berlin's Rykestrasse.

== Thierse controversy ==
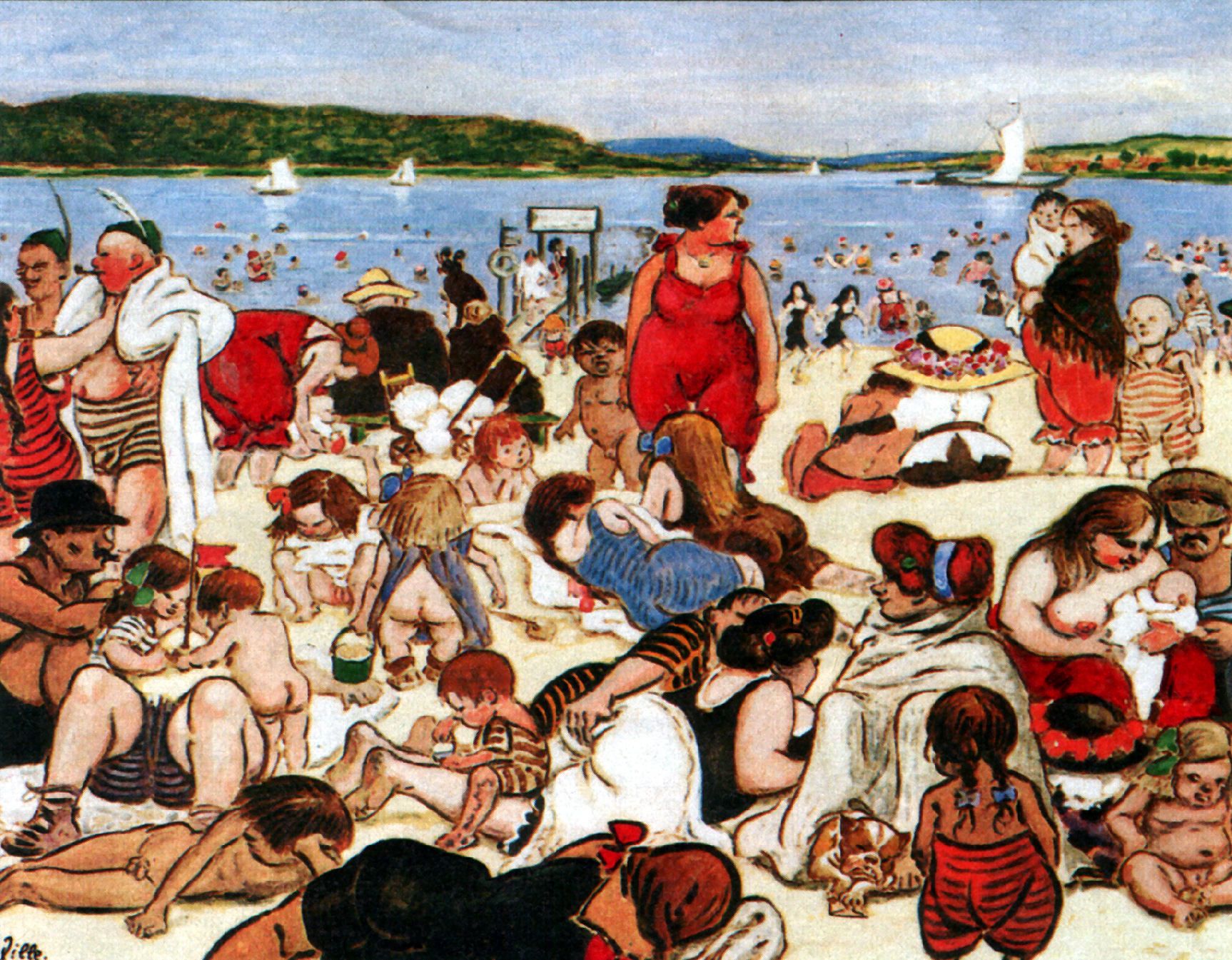
Beach life in Berlin (1901) as depicted by Heinrich Zille

Politician Wolfgang Thierse (SPD) had accused Swabians in Berlin of a lack of adaptive capability and a lack of understanding the 'culture of Berlin'. The notion in a local Berlin newspaper gained nationwide flak. Germans doubt whether Berlin has any (high brow) culture at all, as Berlin 'milieu' stereotypes, based on Heinrich Zille's work, are often working-class-derived. Thierse himself does not have any such local background, as a man of letters and Catholic immigrant from the former Silesia. Cicero magazine tried to describe him as an all-German square "Spießer" due to the controversy. Thierse's use of Überfremdung points against Swabians was harshly criticized, and he faced considerable protest.

During this Berliner Schwabenstreit 2013 various Spaßguerillas turned up, as „Free Schwabylon“, claiming a micronation for Swabian emigrants around Kollwitzplatz, close to Thierses home. New York Times reported about various aspects of the conflict, under the title „Swabian Separatists Fling Spätzle to Make Their Point“.

For later reconciliatory efforts, Thierse received a "Goldene Narrenschelle", an order of Carneval from the Vereinigung Schwäbisch-Alemannischer Narrenzünfte (VSAN), an umbrella organization of Swabian–Alemannic Fastnacht.

== Literature ==
- Bov Bjerg: Großmaultaschenliebe – Ostberliner Schwabenhass. In: Moritz Kienast (Hrsg.): I hate Berlin. Unsere überschätzte Hauptstadt. Bastei Lübbe, Köln 2011, ISBN 3-431-03847-6, p. 161–168.
- Martina Schöller: Schwaben in Berlin. Eine ethnographische Studie. Tübingen 2003
- Martina Schöller: Von Schwaben nach Berlin: eine empirische Untersuchung zur Bedeutung von Herkunft für Binnenmigrationen. Magisterarbeit Universität Tübingen 2004.
- Thomas Bürk, Thomas Götz: Schwaben in Berlin: Metamorphosen einer kulturellen Figur und ihrer urbanen Topographien. In: Beate Binder (Hg.), Moritz Ege (Hg.), Anja Schwanhäußer (Hg.), Jens Wietschorke (Hg.): Orte - Situationen - Atmosphären: kulturanalytische Skizzen. Campus-Verlag, Frankfurt am Main 2010, p. 307-320, ISBN 978-3-593-39269-1.
