= Georg Mühlberg =

German painter, draftsman and illustrator

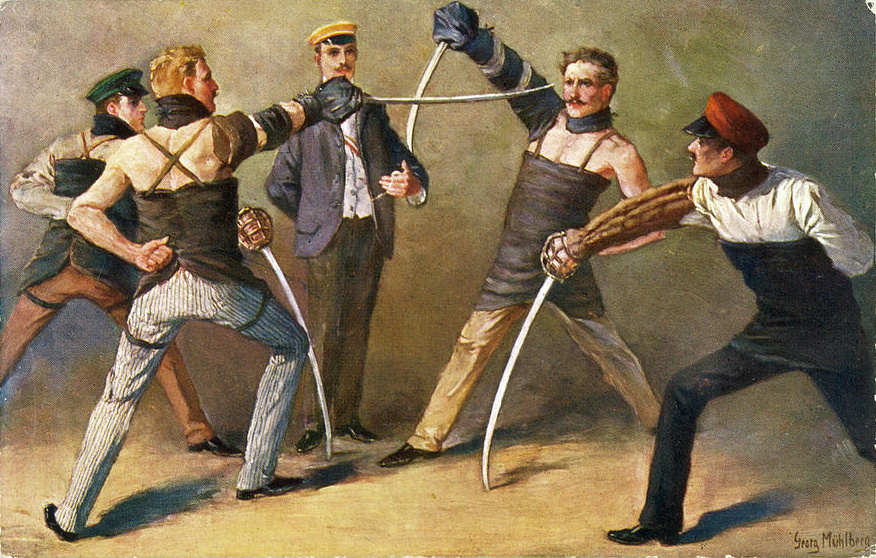
Sabre duel of German students, around 1900, painting by Georg Mühlberg

Georg Mühlberg (5 February 1863 – 1 January 1925) was a German painter, draftsman and illustrator.

Mühlberg illustrated especially children's literature, including fables (Hey Paul, 100 Fables for Children), fairy tales and magazines. Several images depict scenes of student life. He produced a popular postcard series on fairy tales such as The Wishing-Table and The Seven Swabians, the historical novel by Wilhelm Hauff The Piper of Hardt, and novels by E. Marlitt including The Owl House, The secret of the old maid, Gold Else, and Countess Gisela.
