= The Seven Swabians =

German fairy tale

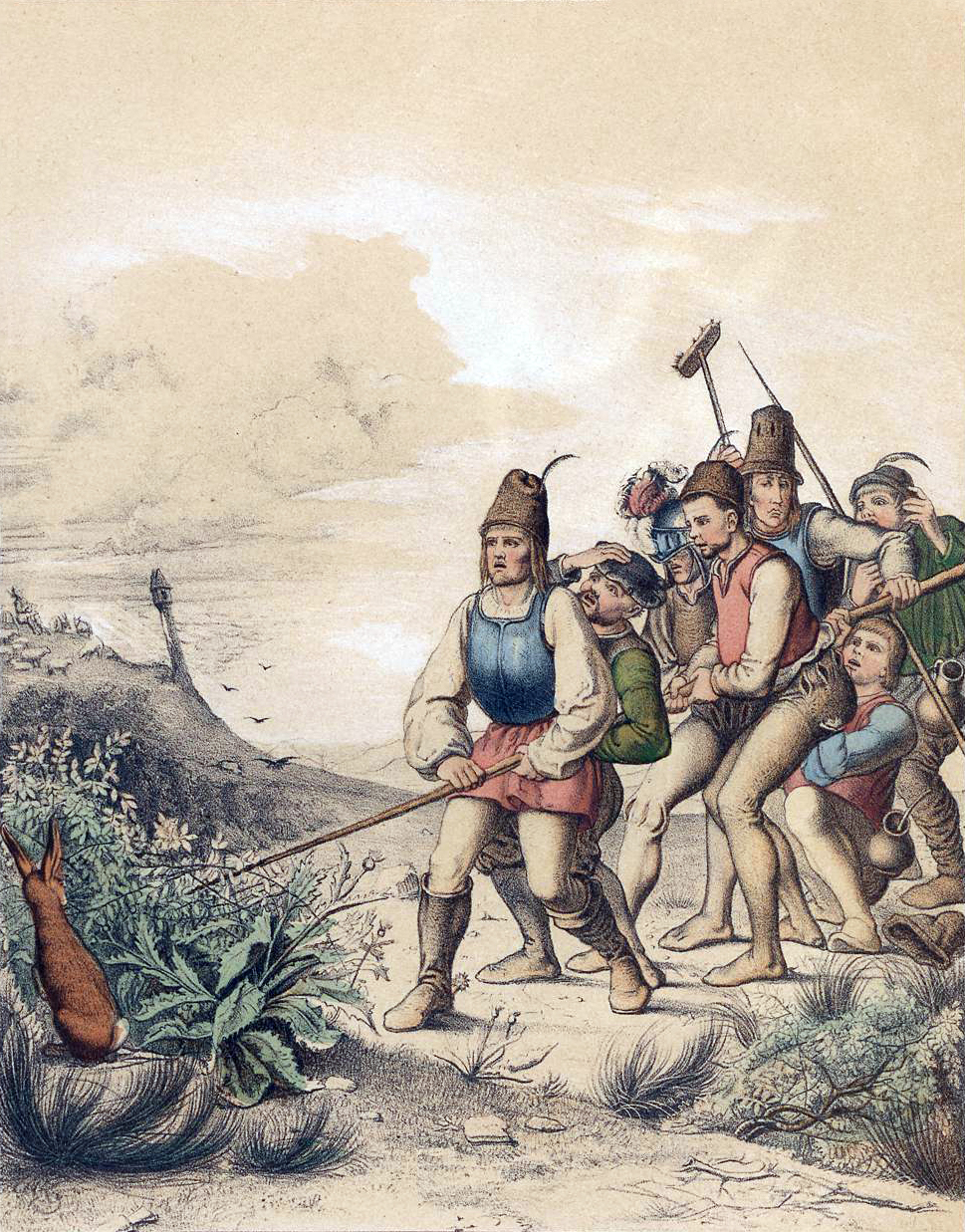
- The Seven Swabians encounter a hare.

Folk tale
- Name: The Seven Swabians
- Aarne–Thompson grouping: ATU 1321
- Country: Germany
- Published in: Grimms' Fairy Tales

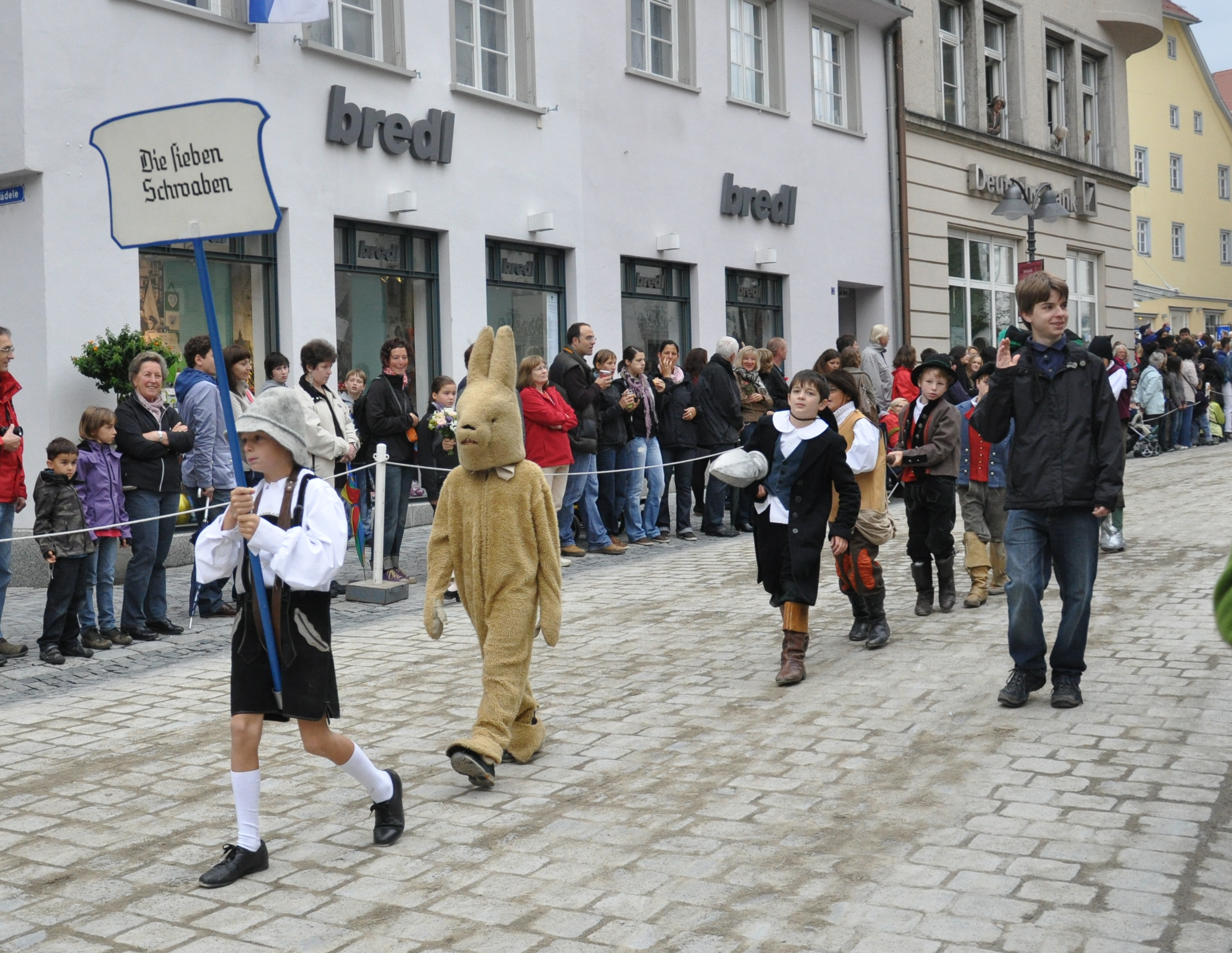
Rutenfest in Ravensburg, Baden-Württemberg, Germany, celebrating the story.

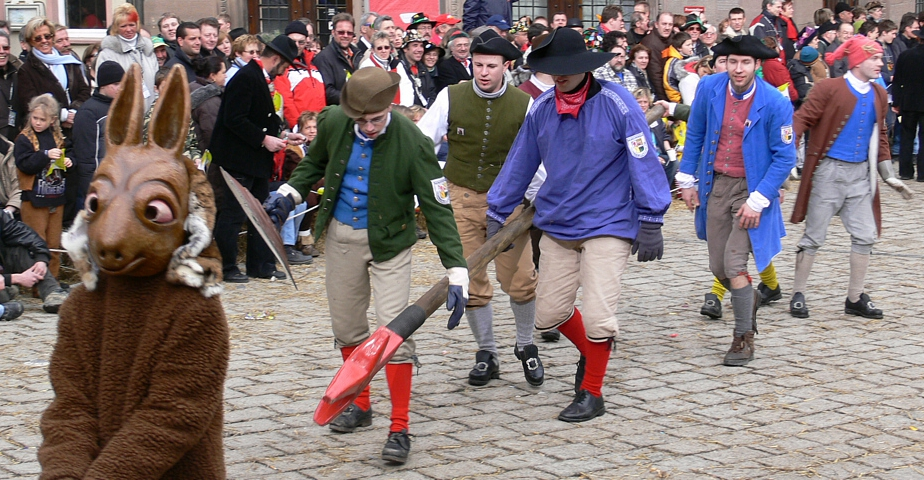
Rutenfest in Ravensburg, Baden-Württemberg, Germany, celebrating the story.

"The Seven Swabians" (German: Die Sieben Schwaben) is a German fairy tale, collected by The Brothers Grimm in the second volume edition of their Kinder- und Hausmärchen (1857) under the number KHM119. The term Swabians refers to people from the German region Swabia, though in Switzerland it refers to Germans in general.

== Plot ==
Once upon a time there were Seven Swabians who travelled through the world. To be safe from danger they carried one long spear with them. One day in July they walk through a meadow just by nightfall and notice a hornet buzzing by. Unaware what they just heard the men start to panic, thinking it was a war drum. One of them tries to flee, jumps over a fence and then walks right on the teeth of a rake, whereupon the handle hits him in the face. He quickly begs for mercy and tells the invisible attacker that he'll surrender, whereupon his six friends do the same. Later, when they finally understand they were fooled they decide to keep this embarrassing anecdote a secret. To prevent the story from getting out they swear to not say anything about it until one of them should accidentally opens his mouth.

Later they encounter a hare sleeping in the sun. They take the animal for a monster and decide to attack it. After bracing themselves with all the courage they can get they strike out and the hare runs away, whereupon they realize they've once again been fooled.

The septet travels onward until they reach the river Moselle. Unaware how to cross it they ask a man on the opposite side of the river for help. Due to the distance and their language the man doesn't understand what they were saying and he asked them in the dialect of Trier: "Wat, Wat?" This causes the men to think that they have to wade (German: wate) through the water. As the first Swabian gets into the river he starts to sink into the mud. His hat is blown away to the opposite shore, next to a frog who croaks noises that sound like "wat, wat, wat". The six surviving Swabians think it's their friend telling them to wade across; they rush in the water and all drown.

== Publication history ==
Hans Wilhelm Kirchhof was the first to write it down in his book Wendemut (1563). Eucharius Eyring wrote it down as a poem in "Proverbiorum Copia" (1601–1604). Ludwig Aurbacher also wrote down a well known version in "Ein Volksbüchlein" (1827–1829) and gave the seven protagonists names: Allgäuer, Seehas, Nestelschwaub, Blitzschwaub, Spiegelschwaub, Gelbfüssler and Knöpfleschwaub.

In 1756 German preacher Sebastian Sailer wrote the tale down as a comedy. Both Ferdinand Fellner and Georg Mühlberg are well known German artists who made illustrations to the story.

== In popular culture ==
=== Music ===
In 1545 the story was adapted into song by Hans Sachs.

In 1887 Karl Millöcker adapted the story into an operette.

=== Other references ===
During World War I the Fokker D.VII (OAW-built 4649/18) of the Luftstreitkräfte's Jasta 65 fighter squadron, flown by Gefreiter (corporal) Wilhelm Scheutzel was resplendent in a scheme depicting a scene from an ancient German fable brought back to popularity by the Brothers Grimm in 1857. There is no other aircraft that possesses a livery depicting an ancient German fable. But his Fokker D.VII has the 'Sieben Schwaben' (Seven Swabians) depicted in battle with a hare, using their one shared, pike-like spear. According to the tale, the men had mistaken the animal for a Dragon. The story is really an olden day 'blonde joke' about the people of Swabia and is thought to have been told by those in neighbouring areas of Germany as a tongue-in-cheek insult to the region.

Scheutzel joined Jasta 65 from Jasta-Schule II on 12 July 1918 and lasted until the end of the war. He scored his one and only kill when he downed a DH4 on 13 August 1918.

Why Scheutzel had this scene depicted on his aircraft is not entirely clear. Was the art an ironic comment on the folly of war, an insult to the Allies that they would flee like rabbits or perhaps Scheutzel liked the war cry given by the leader of the Seven Schwaben in his attack on the rabbit: "then let us boldly advance to the fight, and thus we shall show our valour and might"?

In 1978 a monument was created on the Fehrbelliner Platz in Berlin-Wilmersdorf, sculpted by Hans-Georg Damm.

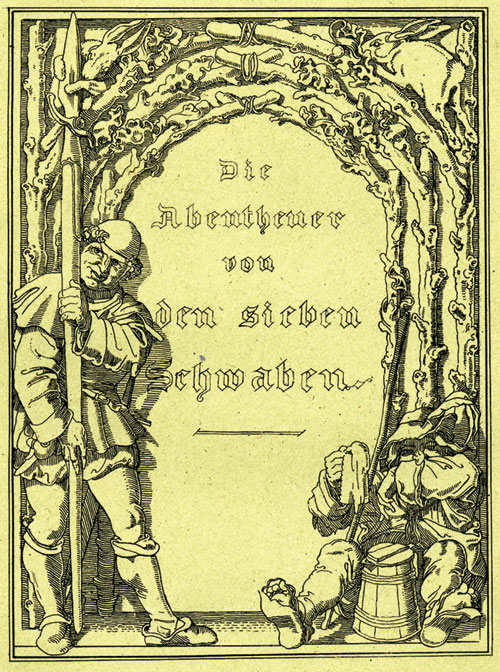
Die Sieben Schwaben, Ludwig Aurbacher, 1832.

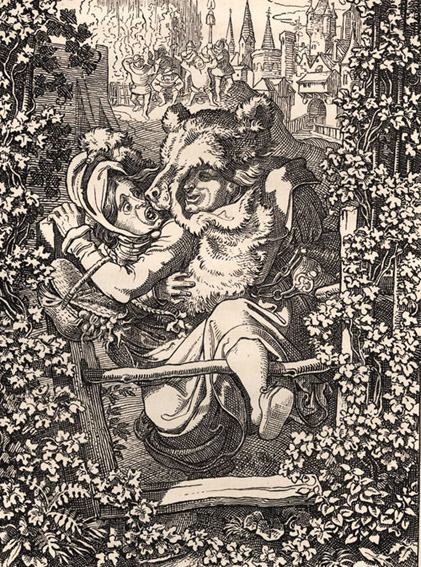
Illustration from The adventures of the Seven Swabians, Ludwig Aurbacher, 1832

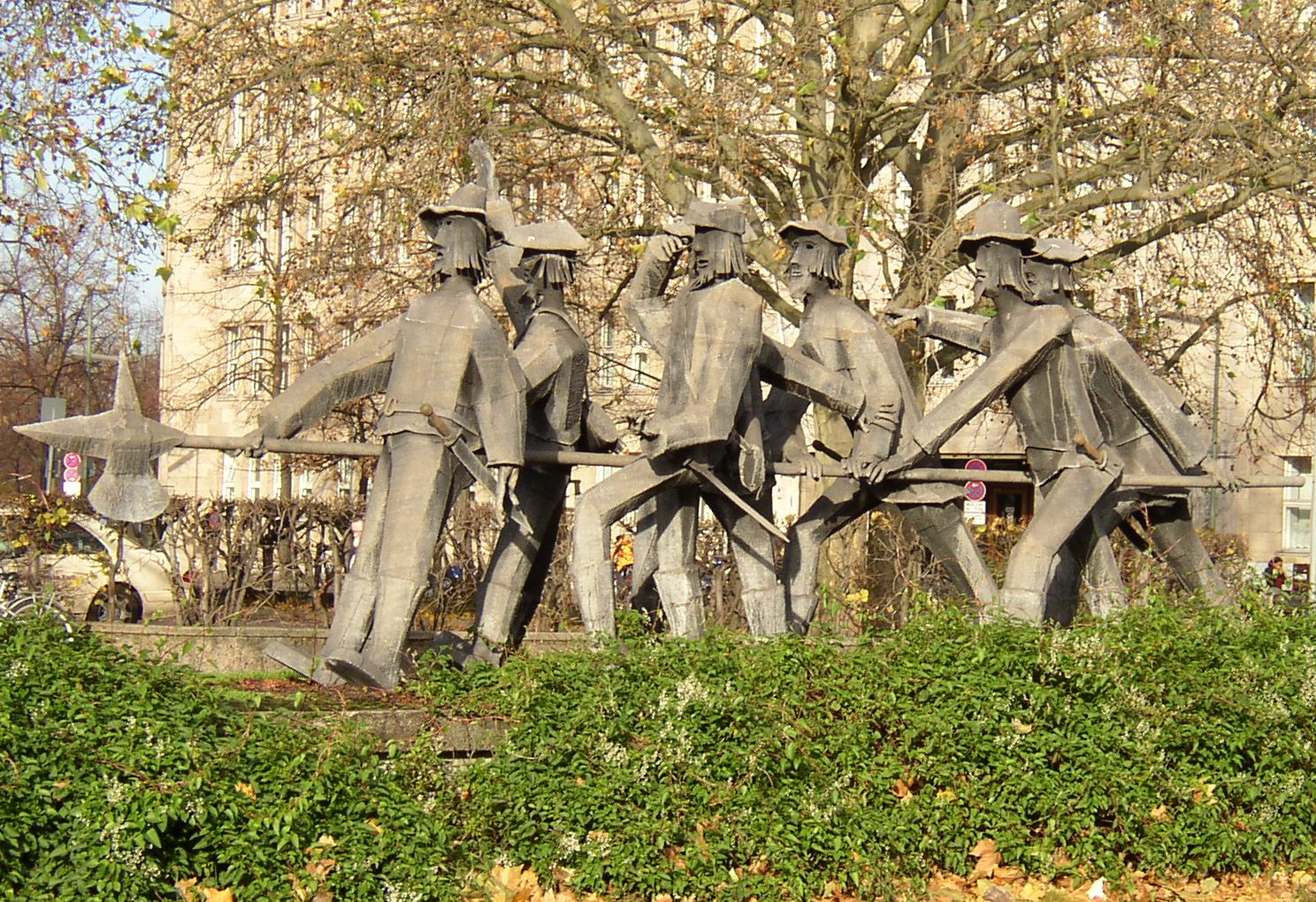
Monument depicting the fairy tale at the Fehrbelliner Platz in Berlin-Wilmersdorf.
