= Richard Muhlberger =

American art critic, and museum curator (1938–2019)

Richard C. Muhlberger (January 20, 1938 – March 23, 2019) was an American art critic and museum curator. He was Curator of Education for the Worcester Art Museum. He later became a professor of art history at Western New England College, and the vice-director for the Metropolitan Museum of Art, but he is best recognized for his analysis of many famous art pieces.

== Career ==
Some of the most famous pieces Mühlberger has critiqued are done by Rembrandt, Leonardo da Vinci, and Pablo Picasso. Along with being a critic, Muhlberger was also a writer. He was known for a series containing critiques of illustrious authors. This series is made up of several books, "What makes a Rembrandt a Rembrandt?", "What makes a Van Gogh a Van Gogh?", "What makes a Monet a Monet?", "What makes a Degas a Degas?", "What makes a Cassatt a Cassatt?", "What makes a Goya a Goya?", "What makes a Bruegel a Bruegel?", What makes a Leonardo a Leonardo?", "What makes a Raphael a Raphael?", and "What makes a Picasso a Picasso?". More of his written works included a series titled "The Bible in Art". It contains the following books "Bible in Art: The Old Testament" and, "Bible in Art: The New Testament". Mühlberger's latest work was called "Charles Webster Hawthorne: Paintings drawings, and Watercolors".

== Personal life and death ==
Muhlberger was born in 1938 in New Jersey. He died in June 2019 at the age of 81.

== Works ==
- The Christmas story: told through paintings. Metropolitan Museum of Art. 1990. ISBN 978-0-15-200426-2.
- What makes a Degas a Degas?. Viking. 1993. ISBN 978-0-670-85205-5.
- American folk marquetry: masterpieces in wood. Museum of American Folk Art. 1998. ISBN 978-0-912161-07-5.
- The Bible in art: the New Testament. Portland House. 1990. ISBN 978-0-517-03364-7.
