= Ludwig Aurbacher =

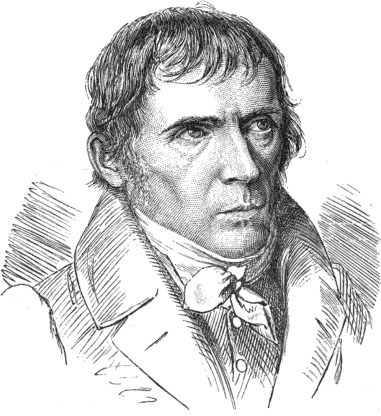
- Born: 26 August 1784; Türkheim, Kingdom of Bavaria
- Died: 25 May 1847 (aged 62); Munich, Bavaria, Kingdom of Bavaria
- Occupations: friar, teacher, writer
- Writing career
- Genres: stories, folk poetry
- Notable work: Ein Volksbüchlein

Ludwig Aurbacher (26 August 1784 – 25 May 1847) was a German teacher and writer. He became famous for his stories about The Seven Swabians.

== Biography ==
He was born in Türkheim, Bavaria, the son of a poor nailsmith. He wanted to become a Catholic clergyman. He attended the school in Landsberg am Lech and was a choirboy for one year. In 1795 he attended the Benedictine seminary in Munich, where he graduated from high school. After that he entered the Ottobeuren Abbey as a novice in 1801. After the dissolution of this abbey, he went to the abbey in Wiblingen, a district of Ulm. In 1803 he left the Benedictine order. From 1804 to 1808 he was a tutor for the chancellor von Weckbecker in Ottobeuren and from 1809 to 1834 professor of German and Aesthetics at the Kadettencorps in Munich.

The work of Aurbacher covers a wide range. From pedagogy, psychology, philology and religion to poetry. He became famous for his Ein Volksbüchlein, a treasure chest of Swabian folk poetry.

In his birthplace Türkheim in the Allgäu, a special room in the Sieben-Schwaben-Museum (Museum of the Seven Swabians) is reminiscent of the author. The Ludwig-Aurbacher-Mittelschule and the Ludwig-Aurbacher-Straße are named after him.

== Selected works ==
- Ein Volksbüchlein. Die Geschichte des ewigen Juden, die Abenteuer der sieben Schwaben, nebst vielen andern erbaulichen und ergötzlichen Historien. 1. Band. München, 1835
- Ein Volksbüchlein. Enthaltend die Legende von St. Christoph, die Wanderungen des Spiegelschwaben, nebst vielen andern erbaulichen und ergötzlichen Historien . 2. Band. München, 1832
- Schriftproben in oberschwäbischer Mundart. München, 1841
