= List of wars involving Switzerland =

Wars and conflicts involving Switzerland since the creation of the Old Swiss Confederacy include:

== Old Swiss Confederacy ==
=== Growth (1291–1523) ===
Start	Finish	Name of conflict	Belligerents		Outcome
Start	Finish	Name of conflict	Allies	Enemies	Outcome
15 November 1315		Battle of Morgarten part of: the growth of the Old Swiss Confederacy	Old Swiss Confederacy	Archduchy of Austria	Decisive Swiss victory; Pact of Brunnen
9 July 1386		Battle of Sempach part of: the growth of the Old Swiss Confederacy	Old Swiss Confederacy	Archduchy of Austria	Decisive Swiss victory
30 June 1422		Battle of Arbedo	Old Swiss Confederacy	Duchy of Milan	Defeat: Temporarily discouraged Swiss expansion in the direction of Lake Maggiore
2 November 1440	12 June 1446	Old Zürich War	Old Swiss Confederacy	(Canton of Zurich) Imperial City of Zürich; Archduchy of Austria; Kingdom of France	Swiss Confederation victory
1474	1477	Burgundian Wars	Old Swiss Confederacy Duchy of Lorraine	Duchy of Burgundy; Duchy of Savoy	Franco-Swiss victory
January 1499	September 1499	Swabian War	Old Swiss Confederacy	Holy Roman Empire: Swabian League	Swiss Confederation victory: Treaty of Basel (1499); Further independence of the Swiss Confederation from the Holy Roman Empire
1511	1516	War of the League of Cambrai	(Switzerland) Swiss mercenaries; Papal States; Spain; Holy Roman Empire; England; Duchy of Milan	Venice; France; Scotland; Duchy of Ferrara	Defeat: End of Swiss expansionism, beginning of Swiss neutrality

=== Reformation (1523–1648) ===
Start	Finish	Name of conflict	Belligerents		Outcome
Start	Finish	Name of conflict	Allies	Enemies	Outcome
1529		First War of Kappel: Civil War of religions	Protestant cantons	Catholic cantons	Unresolved, no actual battles fought
1531		Musso war	Three Leagues; Old Swiss Confederacy (Protestant cantons)	Duchy of Milan	Victory: Increased Catholic-Protestant tension, leading to the Second War of Kappel
1531		Second War of Kappel: Civil War of religions	Catholics: Uri; Schwyz; Zug; Lucerne; Unterwalden	Protestants: Zürich	Catholic cantons victory

=== Ancien Régime (1648–1798) ===
Start	Finish	Name of conflict	Belligerents		Outcome
Start	Finish	Name of conflict	Allies	Enemies	Outcome
January 1653	June 1653	Swiss peasant war of 1653: Civil War	Peasant rebels	City governments troops	Military victory of the ruling city councils
1656 and 1712		The First War of Villmergen and the Toggenburg War (or Second War of Villmergen): Civil Wars of religion	Canton of Zürich; Canton of Bern; Canton of Schaffhausen	Canton of Lucerne; Canton of Uri; Canton of Schwyz; Unterwalden; Canton of Zug; Freie Ämter; Rapperswil	Catholic victory in First war, Protestant victory in second.

== Napoleonic era and Restoration (1798–1848) ==
Start	Finish	Name of conflict	Belligerents		Outcome
Start	Finish	Name of conflict	Allies	Enemies	Outcome
1798	1799	French Revolutionary Wars: French invasion of Switzerland			French victory: Establishment of the Helvetic Republic
1799	1802	War of the Second Coalition	(France) French Republic; (Poland) Polish Legions; French client states	(Holy Roman Empire) Austria; Russia; Great Britain (until 1801); United Kingdom (from 1801); (Kingdom of France) French Royalists; Portugal; Two Sicilies; Ottoman Empire	French Republican victory
1802		Stecklikrieg: Civil war	Centralists; Helvetic Republic	Federalists; Canton of Uri; Canton of Schwyz; Canton of Luzern; Canton of Obwalden; Canton of Nidwalden; Canton of Glarus; City of Zürich; Canton of Bern; Canton of Aargau; Canton of Solothurn; Appenzell Ausserrhoden; Appenzell Innerrhoden	Collapse of the Helvetic Republic, French Act of Mediation and creation of the Swiss Confederation
1806	1807	War of the Fourth Coalition	(France) First French Empire; French client states	Prussia; Russia; United Kingdom; Saxony; Sweden; Sicily	French victory
10 April 1809	14 October 1809	War of the Fifth Coalition	(France) First French Empire; French client states	Austria; Tyrol (in rebellion against Bavaria); United Kingdom; (Kingdom of the Two Sicilies) Sicily; Sardinia; Black Brunswickers	French victory
1813	1814	War of the Sixth Coalition	(France) First French Empire; French client states	Russia; Prussia; Austria; United Kingdom; Sweden; Spain; Portugal; (Kingdom of the Two Sicilies) Sicily; Sardinia	Coalition Victory
20 March 1815	8 July 1815	War of the Seventh Coalition	Seventh Coalition: Austrian Empire; Russian Empire; Prussia; United Kingdom; (Province of Hanover) Hanover; Nassau; Brunswick; Sweden; United Netherlands; Spain; Portugal; Sardinia; (Kingdom of the Two Sicilies) Sicily; Tuscany; Switzerland; (Kingdom of France) French Royalists	(France) First French Empire; (Kingdom of the Two Sicilies) Naples	Coalition victory
6 December 1830	6 December 1830	Freiämtersturm		Freiämtersturm	Freiämtersturm Victory
3 November 1847	29 November 1847	Sonderbund War: Civil war	Swiss Confederation: Aargau; (Appenzell Ausserrhoden) Appenzell AR; Basel-Landschaft; Basel-Stadt; Bern; Geneva; Glarus; Graubünden; St. Gallen; Solothurn; Thurgau; Ticino; Vaud; Zürich	Sonderbund: Fribourg; Lucerne; Nidwalden; Obwalden; Schwyz; Uri; Valais; Zug	Confederation victory

== Modern era ==
Start	Finish	Name of conflict	Belligerents		Outcome
Start	Finish	Name of conflict	Allies	Enemies	Outcome
1940	1945	Aerial incidents in Switzerland in World War II	Switzerland	United States Army Air Forces; (United Kingdom) Royal Air Force; (Nazi Germany) Luftwaffe	Downing of multiple allied aircraft by Swiss fighters; Bombings on multiple towns; U.S. Government paid Swiss $4 million and an additional $14.4 million (in 1944/45 dollars); End of allied and German overflights following the end of World War II
1962	1966	Jura conflict	Switzerland Union of Bernese-Jurassic Patriots (1962–1964)	Jura Liberation Front (1962–1964); Second Jura Liberation Front; (1965–1966)	Swiss victory: Swiss Police arrests FLJ members and leader in 1964.; Second FLJ created in 1965, but Swiss police also captures them in 1966.; Jura becomes a canton in 1979.

== See also ==
- List of battles involving the Old Swiss Confederacy
- Military history of Switzerland
- Swiss Army
