= Military history of Switzerland =

The military history of Switzerland comprises centuries of armed actions, and the role of the Swiss military in conflicts and peacekeeping worldwide. Despite maintaining neutrality since its independence from the Holy Roman Empire in 1499, Switzerland has been involved in military operations dating back to the hiring of Swiss mercenaries by foreign nations, including the Papal States.

== Old Swiss Confederacy ==
Formed with the Federal Charter of 1291, an alliance of three cantons was formed for mutual defense, chiefly against the Habsburgs. A succession of interventions by the Habsburgs led to the battles of Morgarten (1315) and Sempach (1386), resulting in independence for the confederacy. By 1353, the original three cantons had been joined by two additional cantons and three city-states.

=== Swiss mercenaries ===
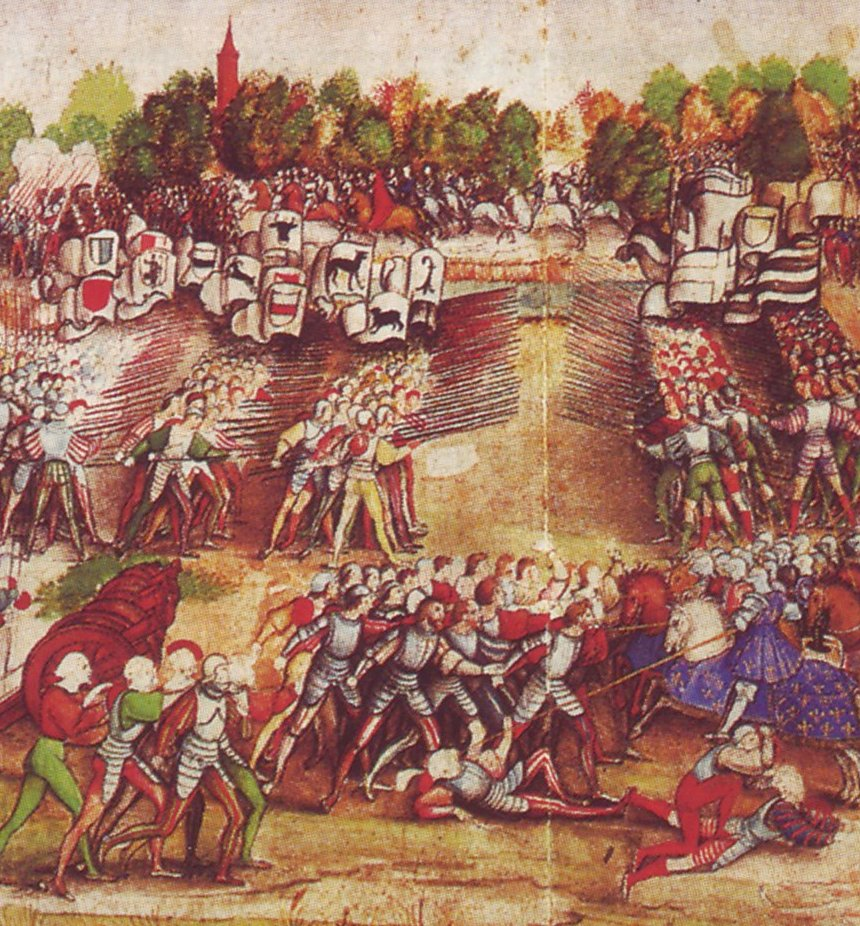
Depiction of Swiss mercenaries assaulting the Landsknecht mercenaries in the French lines at the Battle of Marignano, 1515.

Late in the thirteenth century, soldiers drawn from the cantons of Switzerland gained a military reputation throughout Europe. This reputation was earned as a result of their defense against the Austrian Habsburg overlords and during campaigns in Italy. By the fifteenth century the Swiss had become particularly valued as soldiers-for-hire. Swiss soldiers were noted for their combat skill and ferocious attacks in the phalanx, or deep column formation using pike and halberd. They had a virtual monopoly on pike mercenary service up until 1490.

By 1490, German mercenaries had become proficient in Swiss military tactics and were available for hire at a lower cost. In 1515, the Swiss pledged themselves to neutrality, and they only continued to fight in the service of the Royal French army. They became bitter rivals with the German mercenaries and the two would often fight on the battlefields of Europe during the next few decades.

Following the Battle of Marignano in 1515, the Swiss style of massed-combat fighting went into steady decline, to be replaced by the arquebusiers, artillery and earthworks. During the Battle of Bicocca in 1522, the Swiss mercenaries met a bitter defeat with heavy casualties. Nonetheless, Swiss soldiers continued to serve as mercenaries during the next two centuries, adopting the musket to replace the pike.

==== Swiss Guard ====
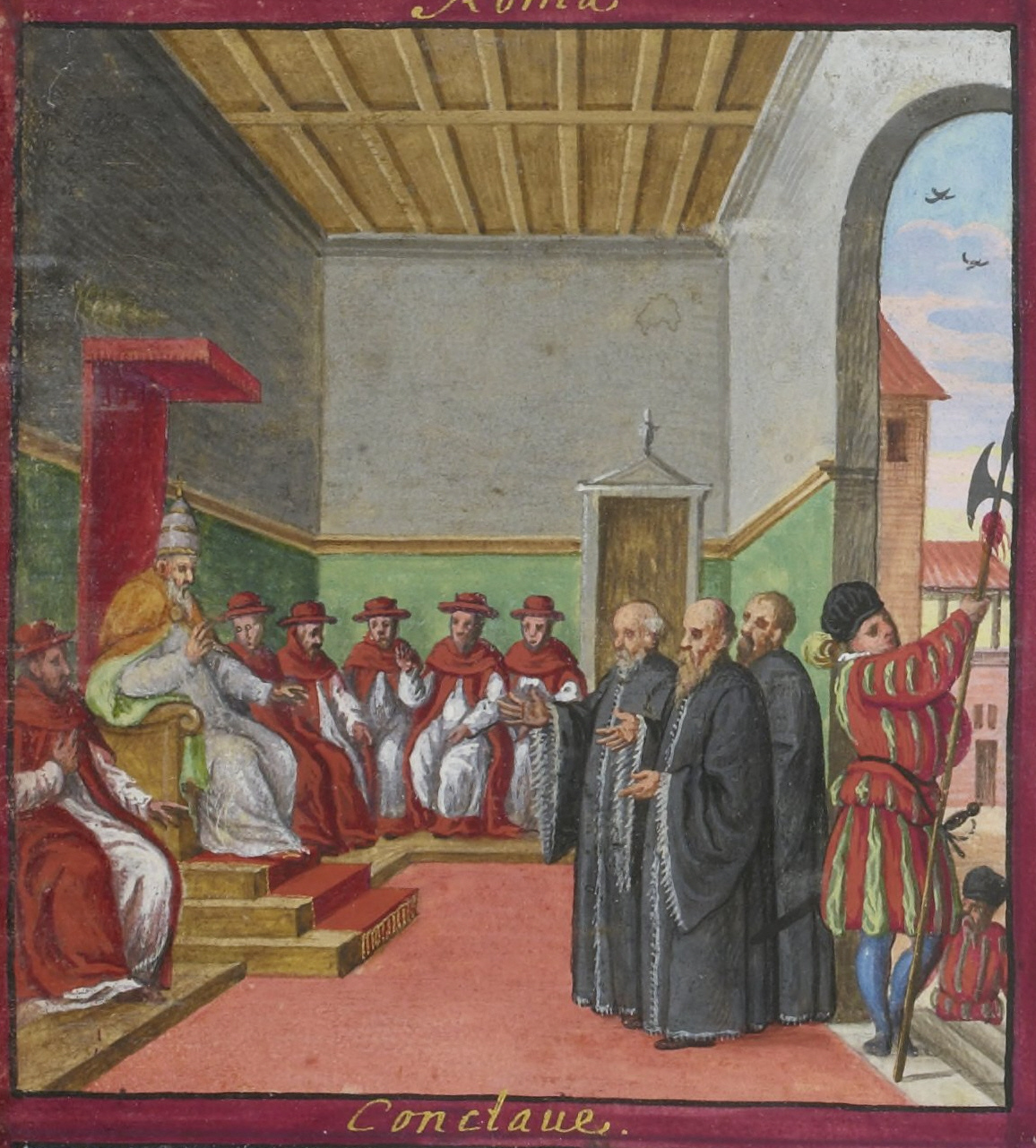
Conclave with Pius V, a Swiss Guard guarding the entrance, ca. 1578.

The Swiss Guard has its origins in 1506 when Pope Julius II hired them as "bodyguards"; however the group of soldiers was large enough to be considered an army. This is appropriate, seeing as the Papal States took up one-third of Italy at the time, requiring extensive protection. The pope enlisted them, seeing as he believed they were the best at the time. Currently, it is illegal for Swiss citizens to join another country's armed forces except as members of the Swiss Guard protecting the Vatican. Military service abroad of dual nationals is permitted under certain circumstances.

=== Internal conflicts after the Reformation ===
The Swiss peasant war of 1653 was a popular revolt by the rural populations of several cantons. The rebellion was suppressed, but it led to a series of reforms. In 1656, tensions between Protestants and Catholics re-emerged and led to the outbreak of the First War of Villmergen. A new conflict in 1712 caused the Second War of Villmergen, which overturned the balance of power to the Protestant cantons. The religious conflicts were renewed in 1847, resulting in the Sonderbund War and leading to the formation of Switzerland as a federal state.

== Helvetic Republic ==
In 1798 the French army overran Switzerland and proclaimed the Helvetic Republic. Internal resistance and economic problems destabilized the state and additional French troops were deployed to restore order. Parts of Switzerland also became a battleground during the Italian and Swiss expedition.

During the 1814-15 Congress of Vienna the neutrality of Switzerland was guaranteed by the signatories.

== Birth of the federal state ==
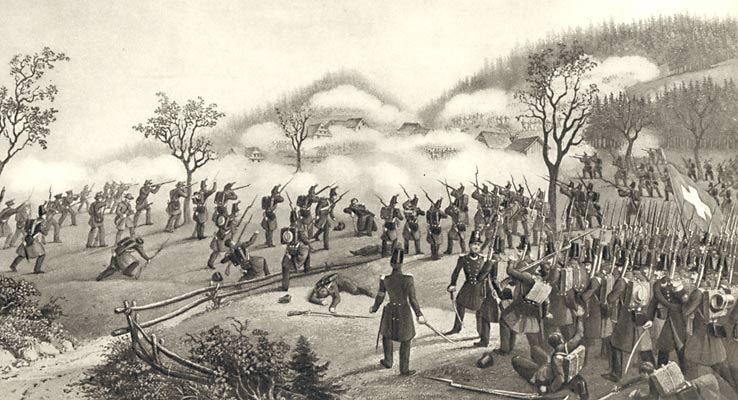
A battalion of soldiers advance during the Battle of Meierskappel. The battle was fought during the Sonderbund War, a civil war in 1847.

In the federal treaty of 1815, the Tagsatzung prescribed cantonal troops to put a contingent of 2% of the population of each canton at the federation's disposition, amounting to a force of some 33,000 men. The cantonal armies were converted into the federal army (Bundesheer) with the constitution of 1848. From this time, it was illegal for the individual cantons to declare war or to sign capitulations or peace agreements. Paragraph 13 explicitly prohibited the federation from sustaining a standing army, and the cantons were allowed a maximum standing force of 300 each (not including the Landjäger corps, a kind of police force). Paragraph 18 declared the obligation of every Swiss citizen to serve in the federal army if conscripted (Wehrpflicht), setting its size at 3% of the population plus a reserve of one and one half that number, amounting to a total force of some 80,000.

The first complete mobilization, under the command of Hans Herzog, was triggered by the Franco-Prussian War in 1871. In 1875, the army was called in to crush a strike of workers at the Gotthard tunnel. Four workers were killed and 13 were severely wounded.

Paragraph 19 of the revised constitution of 1874 extended the definition of the federal army to every able-bodied citizen, swelling the size of the army at least in theory from below 150,000 to more than 700,000, with population growth during the 20th century rising further to some 1.5 million, one of the largest armed force per capita.

== The World Wars ==
During World War I, Switzerland remained a neutral state. In World War II, Germany made some plans for the invasion of Switzerland, most notably Operation Tannenbaum, but these were never carried out. However Swiss air space was repeatedly violated, both by German and Allied aircraft.

Swiss officer barracks in the Umbrail Pass during World War I. Switzerland remained neutral during both World Wars.

=== World War I ===
A major manoeuvre commanded in 1912 by Ulrich Wille, a reputed Germanophile, convinced visiting European heads of state, in particular Kaiser Wilhelm II, of the efficacy and determination of Swiss defences. Wille subsequently was put in command of the second complete mobilization in 1914, and Switzerland escaped invasion in the course of World War I.

=== Interbellum period ===
Wille also ordered the suppression of the Swiss general strike (Landesstreik) of 1918 with military force. Three workers were killed, and a rather larger number of soldiers died of the Spanish flu during mobilization. In 1932, the army was called to suppress an anti-fascist demonstration in Geneva. The troops shot dead 13 demonstrators, wounding another 65. This incident long damaged the army's reputation, leading to persistent calls for its abolition among left-wing politicians. In both the 1918 and the 1932 incidents, the troops deployed were consciously selected from rural regions such as the Berner Oberland, fanning the enmity between the traditionally conservative rural population and the urban working class.

=== World War II ===
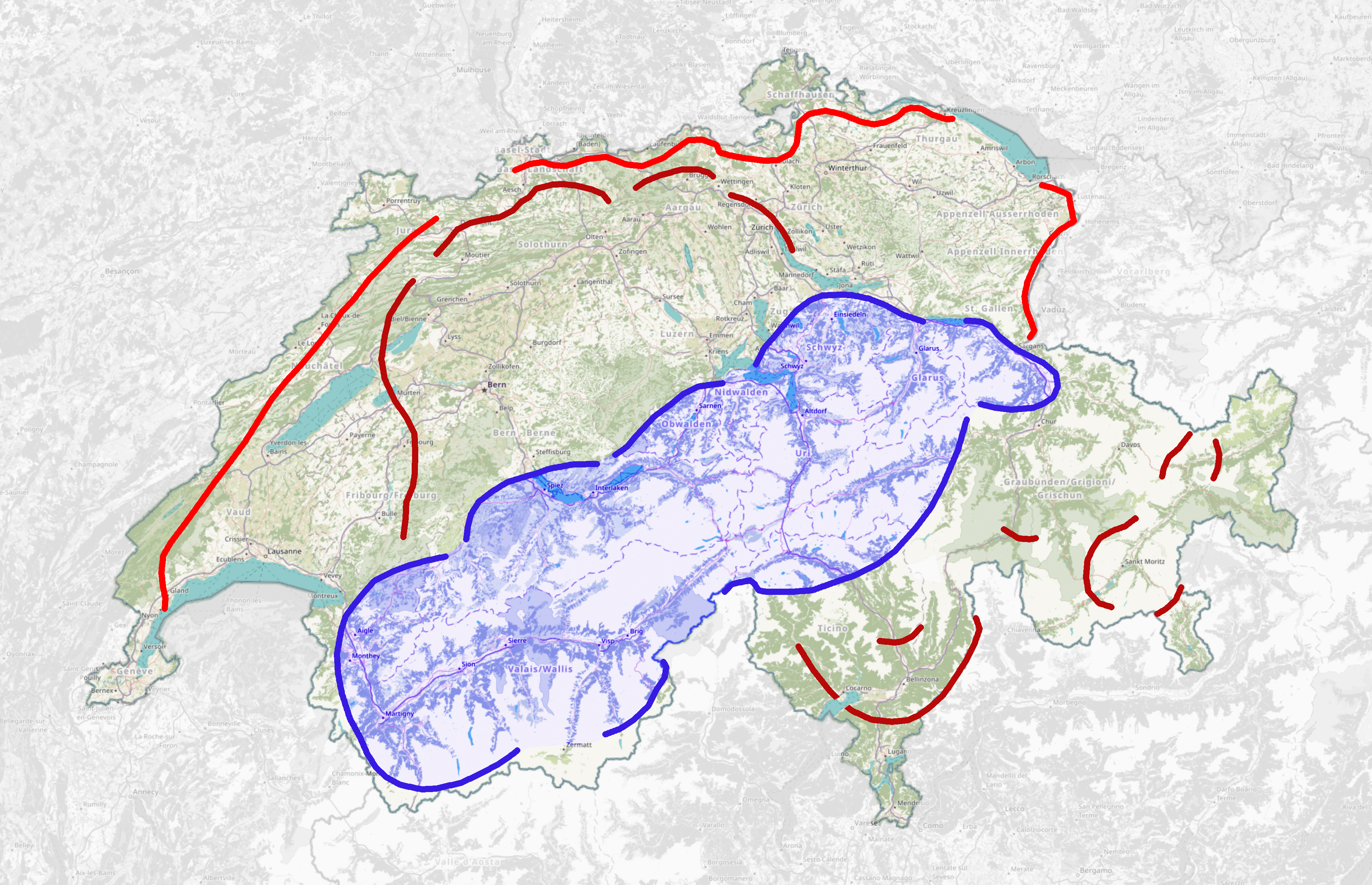
Plan of the defence lines of the National Redoubt

The third complete mobilization of the army took place during World War II under the command of Henri Guisan.

Switzerland's military strategy during World War II was essentially one of deterrence. The idea was to make clear to the Third Reich that an invasion would have a high cost. Simultaneously, economic concessions were made to Germany in the hope that the overall cost of a German invasion would be perceived as higher than the potential benefits. Despite this, it is clear that Hitler intended to invade eventually and that the Allied landing at Normandy as well as the difficulties faced in invading Russia were pivotal in merely delaying an invasion. After Switzerland was surrounded by German and Italian forces of Operation Tannenbaum, General Guisan revealed on 25 July 1940 at the so-called Rütli rapport, a meeting of the Swiss Armed Forces staff at the founding site of the Swiss confederation, that in case of attack the Swiss would only defend the high Alps including the important transalpine roads and rail links. As a last resort, the army would make these routes useless to the Axis by destroying key bridges and tunnels. This plan, known as the National Redoubt, meant that the populated lowlands – including the economic centres of the country – would effectively be ceded to the Germans and to the Italians. The gold reserves of the Swiss National Bank in Zürich were moved farther away from the German border, to the Gotthard Pass and to Bern.

Many billions of Swiss francs have been invested in building the fortifications in the mountains, which are partly still used by the army. The most important buildings of the Reduit were the fortifications of Sargans, St. Maurice (Valais) and the Gotthard region. The caverns of those time were equipped with the needed infrastructure; beside cannons and howitzers they consisted of dormitories, kitchens, field hospitals, rooms for the sick and bakeries; and they provided space enough to accommodate 100 to 600 soldiers for a timespan of up to several months. Because the tensions between the western countries and the USSR cooled down and bunkers became more or less obsolete because of newer weapon systems, a great number of the Reduit buildings were closed. Some of them have been reopened as museums and can be visited.

== Cold War ==
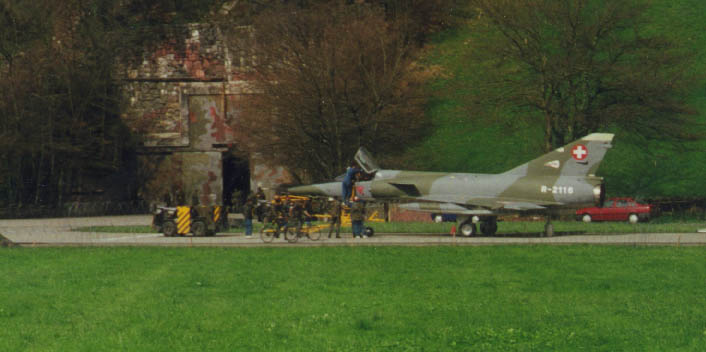
Mirage III at an aircraft cavern, 2005. Large-scale construction of these types of hangars was conducted by the Swiss military in the 1950s.

At the end of the 1950s, reflecting both the imagined threat of possible invasion by the Soviet Union and the realities of nuclear warfare, Swiss military doctrine changed to mobile defense that included missions for the air force outside of its territory, in order to defeat standoff attacks and nuclear threats, including the possibility of defensive employment of air-delivered nuclear weapons. However the inability to field an air force of sufficient capability to carry out such missions led to a return of traditional "protection of own territory" doctrine. Meanwhile, the Air Force also began to prepare ad hoc airbases in the mountains, with sections of highway strengthened to act as runways and hangars carved out of the mountains.

In the 1960s and 1970s, the armed forces were organised according to the "Armee 61" structure.

During the Cold War, Swiss authorities considered the construction of a Swiss nuclear bomb. Leading nuclear physicists at the Federal Institute of Technology Zurich such as Paul Scherrer made this a realistic possibility. However, financial problems with the defense budget prevented the substantial funds from being allocated, and the Nuclear Non-Proliferation Treaty of 1968 was seen as a valid alternative. All remaining plans for building nuclear weapons were dropped by 1988.

== Contemporary history ==
In 1989, the status of the army as a national icon was shaken by a popular initiative aiming at its dissolution (see: Group for a Switzerland without an Army) receiving 35.6% support. This triggered a series of reforms, and in 1995, the number of troops was reduced to 400,000 ("Armee 95"). Article 58.1 of the 1999 constitution repeats that the army is "in principle" organized as a militia, implicitly allowing a small number of professional soldiers. A second initiative aimed at the army's dissolution in late 2001 received a mere 21.9% support. Nevertheless, the army was shrunk again in 2004, to 220,000 men ("Armee XXI"), including the reserves.

In 2003, for the first time since 1815, Switzerland deployed troops on foreign soil. The Swiss Armed Forces deployed 31 soldiers to Afghanistan. Swiss participation in the War in Afghanistan ended in 2008 when 2 officers who had served with German forces returned home.

On September 22, 2013, a referendum was held that aimed to abolish conscription in Switzerland. However, the referendum failed with over 73% of the electorate voting against it, showing the strong support for conscription in Switzerland.

In 2016, the Swiss Federal Assembly voted to further reduce the army from 140,000 men to 100,000 men, reducing the time of basic training from 21 weeks to 18, but also to increase the military budget by 2.4 billion Swiss francs. In 2022, the Assembly voted to increase spending by 1.4 billion Swiss francs by 2030, or at least 1% of the country's GDP. The government planned to spend up to 50 billion Swiss francs on defense through the early 2030s. In 2024, the Armed Forces was projected to face significant funding shortfalls.

In 2019, Lieutenant Colonel Christine Hug became the first openly transgender officer in the Swiss Army.

== See also ==
- Switzerland–NATO relations
- History of the Swiss Air Force
- Battles of the Old Swiss Confederacy
- List of wars involving Switzerland

== Bibliography ==
- Roman Schürmann: Helvetische Jäger. Dramen und Skandale am Militärhimmel. Rotpunktverlag, Zürich 2009, ISBN 978-3-85869-406-5
- Lombardi, Fiona (2007). The Swiss Air Power: Wherefrom? Whereto?. Zürich University. ISBN 978-3-7281-3099-0.
