= Leuenberger =

Leuenberger is a surname. Notable people with the surname include:

- Benjamin Leuenberger (born 1982), Swiss businessman and former racing driver
- Matthew Leuenberger (born 1988), Australian football player
- Moritz Leuenberger (born 1946), Swiss politician
- Niklaus Leuenberger (c.1615–1653), Swiss rebel
- Sven Leuenberger (born 1969), Swiss ice hockey player
- Werner Otto Leuenberger (born 1932), Swiss artist
