= Joachim Meggeli =

Swiss politician (d. 1590)

Landammann of Appenzell Innerrhoden
- In office 1553–1587

Chancellor of Appenzell

Personal details
- Born: c. 1520
- Died: 27 September 1590 Appenzell, Appenzell Innerrhoden
- Spouse: Anna Gartenhauser Barbara Zimmermann Barbara Scheuss Anna Mutscheller

Joachim Meggeli (born no later than 1520; died 27 September 1590) was a Swiss politician who served as chancellor and later Landammann of Appenzell Innerrhoden. He was a leading figure of the Counter-Reformation in the region and played a central role in enforcing Catholic unity in the inner Rhodes of Appenzell.

== Early life and family ==
Joachim Meggeli was born no later than 1520, son of Joachim Meggeli, who served as chancellor, and grandson of Hans Meggeli. He married four times: to Anna Gartenhauser, Barbara Zimmermann, Barbara Scheuss, and Anna Mutscheller.

== Political career ==
Meggeli served as chancellor of Appenzell from 1543 to 1553. He was subsequently elected Landammann eight times between 1553 and 1587. During his political career, he also served as Landesfähnrich in 1570, held the position of parish administrator, and attended the Federal Diet nearly 90 times as a delegate.

In 1560, Meggeli addressed administrative abuses in the secular administration of the Wonnenstein convent, ensuring its survival. He negotiated with Saint Gall Abbey, leading to the abolition of mortmain in 1566. Under his initiative, Appenzell established a baptismal register in 1570 and adopted the Gregorian calendar in 1584, though it remained valid only for the outer Rhodes until the "calendar affair" of 1589–1590.

== Religious policy ==
Together with Bartholomäus Dähler and Johannes von Heimen, Meggeli formed a leading triumvirate in Appenzell that supported the Counter-Reformation after the mid-16th century and sought confrontation with Protestantism. He brought the Capuchins to Appenzell and oversaw the construction of their monastery between 1587 and 1590. In 1587–1588, he pressed the council to strengthen the principle of confessional parish unity, forcing Protestants in the inner Rhodes to either convert or leave. He also promoted membership in the Golden League, which was realized in 1600. In 1588, Appenzell entered into an alliance with Spain, provoking strong reactions in the outer Rhodes.

== Urban planning ==
Meggeli planned the reconstruction of the villages of Herisau (burned in 1559) and Appenzell (burned in 1560). In Appenzell, he oversaw the raising of the nave of the parish church, as well as the reconstruction of the town hall and an adjacent house where he lived.

== Death ==
Joachim Meggeli died on 27 September 1590 in Appenzell.
