= Johann Rudolf Wettstein =

Swiss diplomat and mayor of Basel

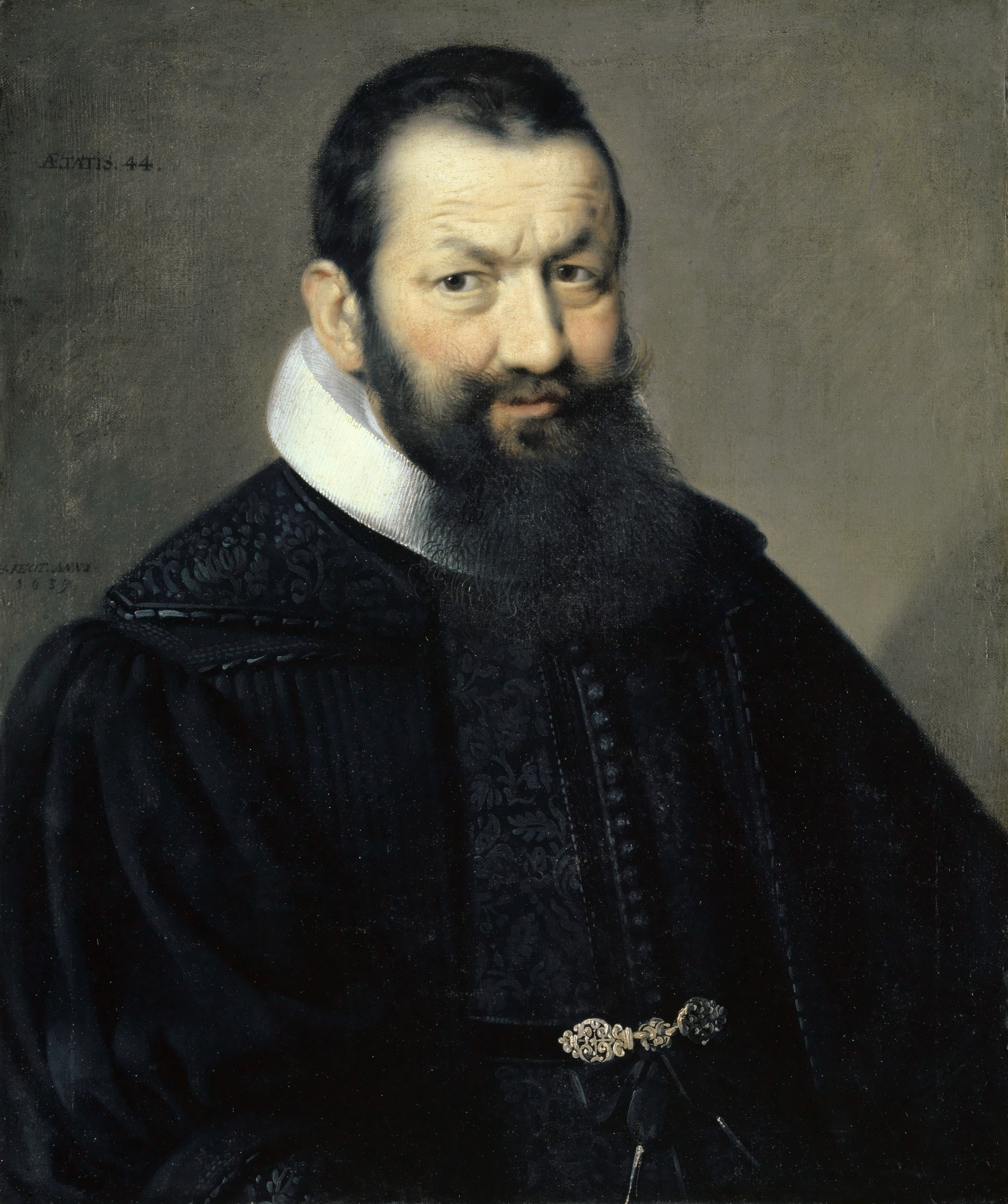
- Johann Rudolf Wettstein by Samuel Hoffmann in 1649

Mayor of Basel Stadt

Personal details
- Born: 27 October 1594 Basel
- Died: 12 April 1666 (aged 71) Basel
- Spouse: Anna Maria Falkner

Johann Rudolf Wettstein (27 October 1594, Basel – 12 April 1666, Basel) was a Swiss diplomat and mayor of Basel, who achieved fame through his diplomatic skills, culminating in de iure Swiss independence from the Holy Roman Empire in 1648.

== Early life and education ==
Johann Rudolf Wettstein was born on 27 October 1594 as the youngest of five sons, and attended the "Schule auf Burg," the present-day secondary school located at the Münsterplatz in Basel. At the Gymnasium, he was taught the basics in Latin and history and he graduated with fourteen years of age. Afterwards he concluded a chancellery apprenticeship in Yverdon and Geneva where he learned the French language which would be useful in later career as a diplomat. In 1611, as he was 17 years old, he married Anna Maria Falkner a noble woman from Basel. The Historical Dictionary of Switzerland records that Wettstein's marriage was not a happy one. With time he owed quite a sum to his wife's family and apparently for that reason he moved to Italy in 1616, where he served in the Venetian military.

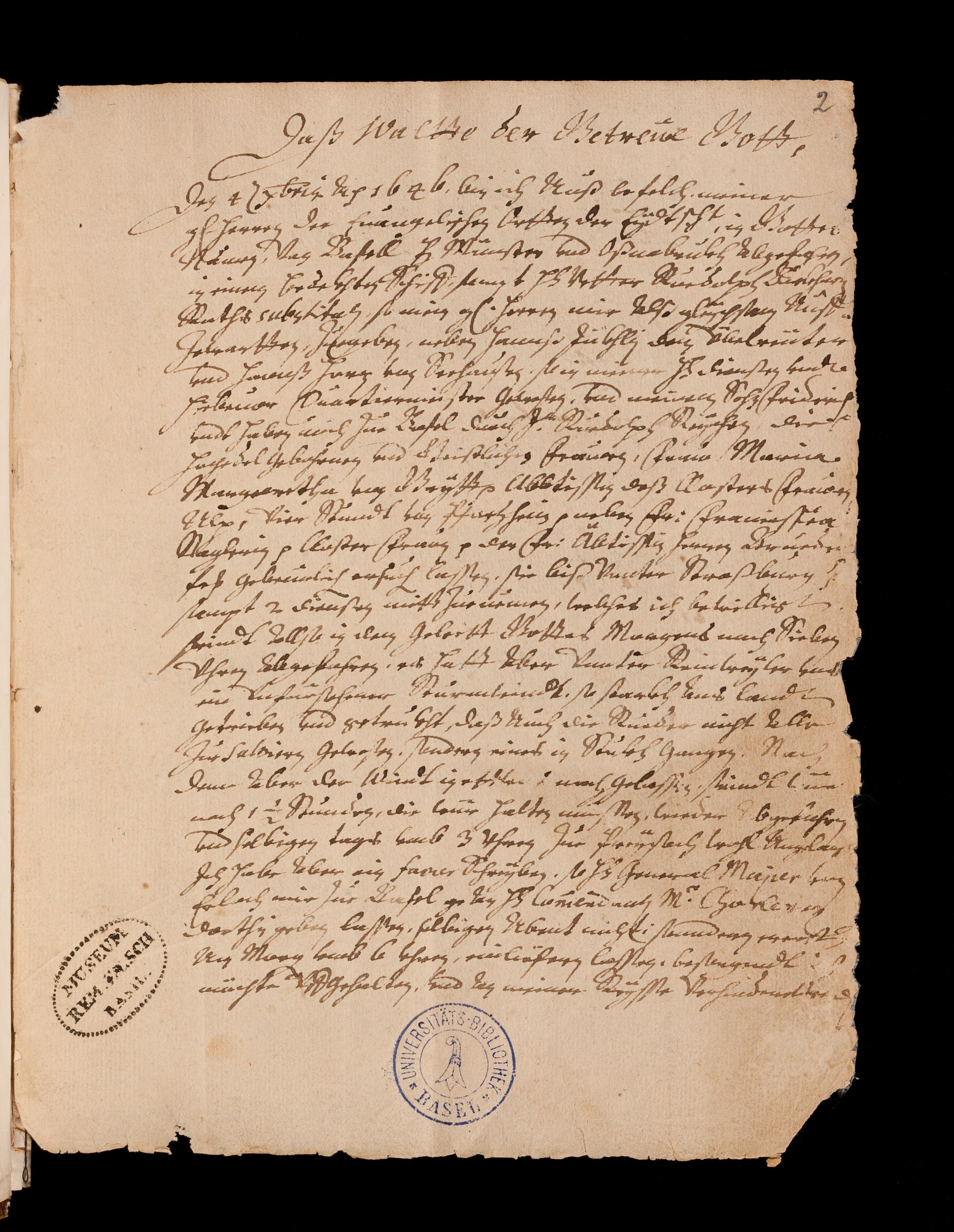
Excerpt of his diary he held during the negotiations for the Peace of Westphalia

== Political career ==
In 1620, after his return to Basel, Wettstein was elected to the city council. His career in the public service progressed with increasingly responsible positions becoming the Vogt of Farnsburg from 1624 to 1626 and of Riehen from 1626 to 1635. In 1635 he became senior guild master in the city of Basel, and by June 1645 he was elected its Mayor, which he stayed for twenty-one years. In 1661 he supported the purchase of the extensive collections included in the Amerbach- Cabinet with public funds.

=== Swiss independence ===
Wettstein participated in the negotiations for the Peace of Westphalia in 1646/47 interested to gain juridical independence for the merchants of Basel from the Holy Roman Empire. As Wettstein travelled by ship to Münster in 1646, he was not invited, much less was he in possession of an accreditation by the Swiss Confederacy. He was only provided with a mandate by the reformists. From the Swiss confederacy he received the official accreditation only in 1647 and after a long and skillful mediation, he achieved the official recognition of the Swiss independence from the Holy Roman Empire on the 24 October 1648 and Habsburg renunciation of all claims to Swiss government. In memory of this achievement Basel minted a coin and the merchants of Basel donated a trophy.

He had a second diplomatic journey accompanied by Sebastian Peregrin Zwyer in winter 1650/51, this time before Emperor Ferdinand III. Following the Frankfurter trade fair in October 1650, the German Court in Speyer, ordered the seizure of certain goods from the merchants in Basel and after some negotiations in Viennas Hofburg, the two achieved their liberation. Ferdinand ordered the goods restitution to the merchants of Basel, together with the payment of a fine of 100 Marks in Gold. In exchange Wettstein and Zwyer agreed to an Austrian demand, that Swiss soldiers wouldn't participate in battles which would expand the French territories.

=== Professional career ===
He earned some money with his political duties, but those were not enough to finance his family's household. At the time, it was normal that politicians earned their main income elsewhere mostly through commerce. Wettstein though appeared to have made several financial investments.

== Later life, death and posthumous recognition ==
During the Peasants' War of 1653, Wettstein was responsible for the public execution of seven peasant leaders. Wettstein died in Basel in 1666. He was not buried in the Münster in Basel as his wife, but in the Barfüsser Church. He is generally acknowledged as one of the most competent Swiss politicians of his era, but also as a prominent exponent of the absolutist tendencies within the Swiss Confederacy.

Associated with Switzerland's independence, Wettstein's name first became prominent around 1750, and reached its zenith during World War II, when the country's sovereignty was challenged once more.

A bridge bearing his name was built across the Rhine in Basel in 1881. In addition, a memorial-fountain, a local square and a street beside the bridge, as well as a march of the Basler Carnaval were named after Wettstein.

== Family ==
His parents Jakob Wettstein and Magdalena Betzler had migrated from Russikon in the Zurich region around 1580. His father worked in the Basel hospital, eventually becoming hospital supervisor. His father died shortly before he left Basel for Italy in 1616. In 1611 Johann Rudolf married Anna Maria Falkner. They were the parents of four sons and five daughters. Two daughters died early due to the plague. Their marriage was not a happy one as his wife's family was from the nobility of Basel while he came from a humble household and felt challenged to fulfill his wife's families demands. His wife died in 1647 while he was negotiating the Peace of Westphalia in Münster.

== Sources ==
- Thomas Quinn Marabello. "Challenges to Swiss Democracy: Neutrality, Napoleon, & Nationalism," Swiss American Historical Society Review, Jun. 2023, Vol. 59: No. 2. Available at: https://scholarsarchive.byu.edu/sahs_review/vol59/iss2/5
- Julia Gauss / Alfred Stoecklin: Bürgermeister Wettstein. Der Mann, das Werk, die Zeit, Basel 1953.
- Historisches Lexikon der Schweiz. Article on Wettstein prepared by Franz Egger: http://www.hls-dhs-dss.ch/textes/d/D19086.php
- Historisches Museum Basel (Hg.): Wettstein - Die Schweiz und Europa 1648, Begleitpublikation zur gleichnamigen Ausstellung, Basel 1998.
- Stefan Hess: Der Weinberg des Herrn Burgermeister. Johann Rudolf Wettstein als Weinproduzent, in: Basler Zeitschrift für Geschichte und Altertumskunde 98 (1998), S. 35–47.
