= Niklaus Leuenberger =

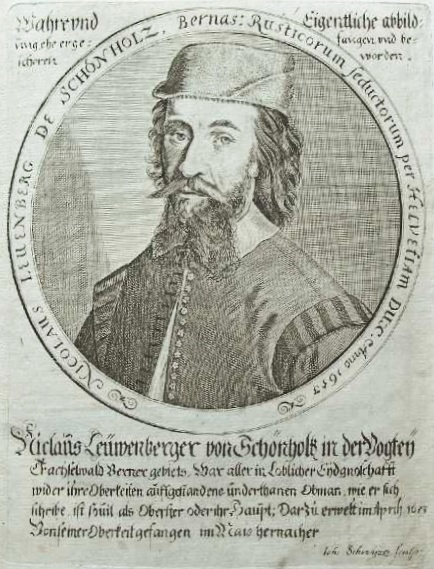

Niklaus Leuenberger (c. July 17, 1615 – executed 6 September, 1653^{[a]} Bern, Switzerland) was one of the leaders of the rural rebellion that led to the Swiss peasant war of 1653 in Switzerland. He was nicknamed the "King of the Peasants."

Leuenberger was baptized on July 17, 1615. He was part of a well-to-do peasant family. His father, Hans, was born in 1586. From 1643, he was a member of the court of Ranflüh.

Appointed leader of the uprising shortly before the formation of the "League of Huttwil" (May 14, 1653), he was nicknamed the "King of the Peasants" because he was one of the leaders of the rebellion. Leuenberger had Bern besieged by his troops on May 22, 1653. Six days later, after reaching an agreement with the mayor of Bern (the "peace of Murifeld") Leuenberger left the vicinity of the city.

On June 3, 1653, his troops clashed at Wohlenschwil with the contingent of Hans Conrad Werdmüller, who had not been informed in time of the development of the situation. Ill-equipped, Leuenberger's army was defeated and had to retreat.

On June 4 1653, he signed the Treaty of Mellingen along with Christian Schybi.

On June 7, 1653, a Bernese expedition led by Sigmund von Erlach encountered a regiment of 2,000 men from Leuenberger. The peasants fell back to Herzogenbuchsee where they were defeated by Von Erlach. The city was burned during the battle and Leuenberger fled. He tried to hide but was betrayed by a neighbor

On June 9, 1653, Samuel Tribolet, the Landvogt (sheriff) of the district of Bern apprehended him.

On September 6, 1653, after the defeat of the peasants at Herzogenbuchsee, he was delivered to the Bernese authorities. Leuenberger was executed by decapitation with a sword and drawn and quartered in Bern. His head was fixed on a gallows with a copy of the Huttwil league federal charter next to it. Four parts of his body were exhibited on the four highways out Bern.

On June 7, 1903, on the occasion of the 250th anniversary of the Peasants' War, a monument was erected in honor of Niklaus Leuenberger in Ruderswil.

== Footnotes ==
- ^{a} All dates are given according to the Gregorian calendar, which was already in effect in all the Catholic cantons. The Protestant cantons still followed the Julian calendar at that time.
