= Hans Emmenegger =

Hans Emmenegger may refer to:

- Hans Emmenegger (peasant leader) (1604–1653), Swiss peasant leader in the Swiss peasant war of 1653
- Hans Emmenegger (painter) (1866–1940), Swiss painter
