= Sebastian Peregrin Zwyer =

Baron Sebastian Peregrin Zwyer von Evibach
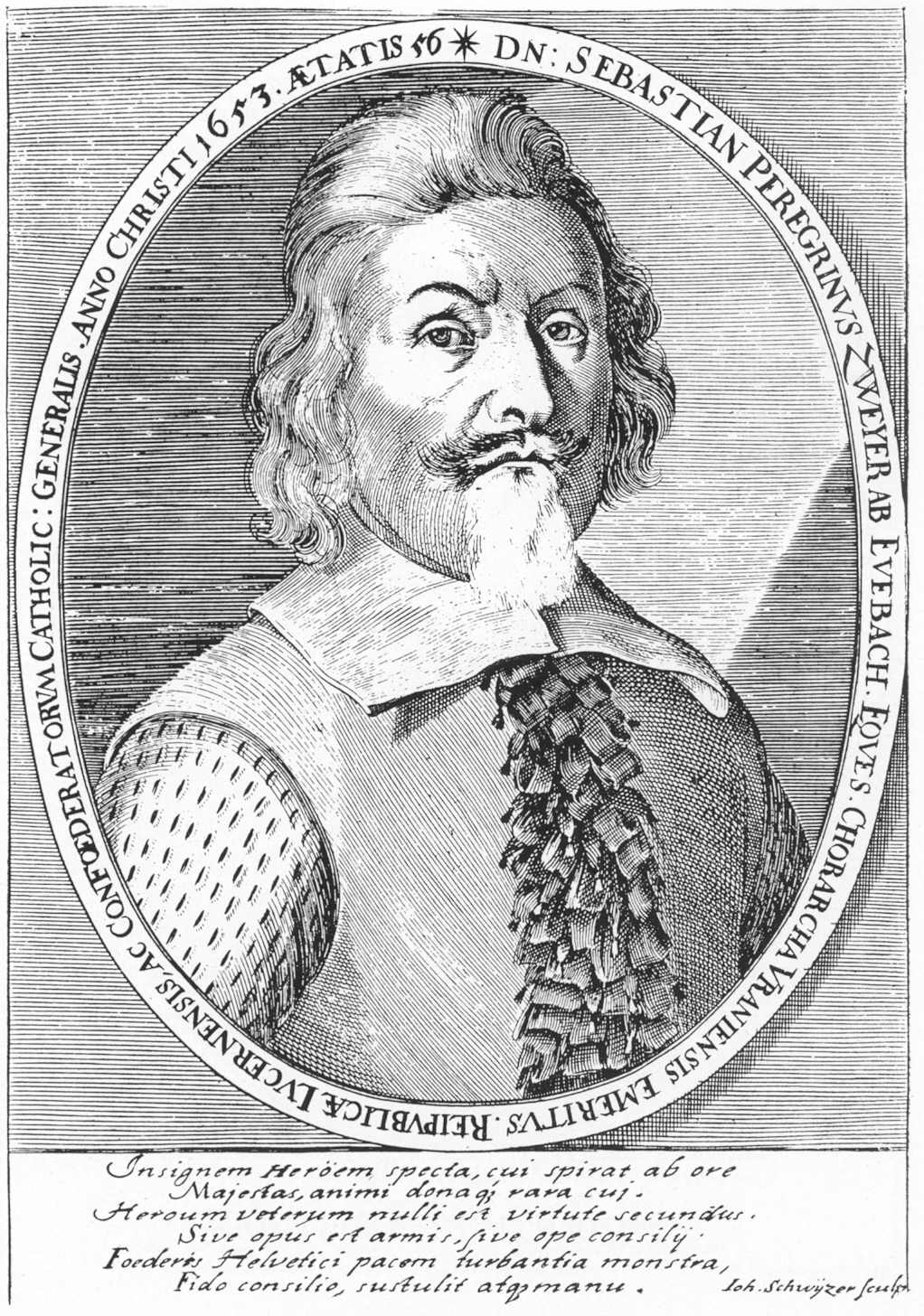
- Contemporary engraving by Johann Schwyzer
- Born: 1597; Klingnau, Old Swiss Confederacy
- Died: 15 February 1661 (aged 63–64); Altdorf, Uri, Old Swiss Confederacy
- Spouse: Maria Ursula von Roll
- Military career
- Allegiance: House of Habsburg
- Service years: 1612–1642
- Rank: Lieutenant Field-Marshal
- Conflicts: Battle of White Mountain; Battle of Nördlingen (1634); Swiss peasant war of 1653; Battles of Villmergen
- Awards: Ritter (1653); Reichsfreiherr (1658)
- Other work: Landeshauptmann of Uri (1648)

Sebastian Peregrin Zwyer (of Evibach) (1597 – 15 February 1661) was a Swiss military commander, mercenary entrepreneur, and one of the foremost politicians of the Old Swiss Confederacy in the seventeenth century.

== Biography ==
A native of the Swiss canton of Uri (he was probably born in Klingnau), Zwyer initially pursued a military career. From 1612 to 1617, he served in a mercenary regiment in the service of Spain and Milan; from 1619 to 1642 he was in service for the Habsburg emperors, first for Ferdinand II and then Ferdinand III. Zwyer fought in several battles of the Thirty Years' War. He participated in the Battle of White Mountain in 1620, fought at Glückstadt in 1624, at Mantua in 1630, and at Nördlingen in 1634.

In 1635, he was promoted to the rank of Major-General and made a member of the emperor's staff, where he was responsible for reforming the armies following the Swedish example. From 1638 to 1641 he again fought in northern Italy, commanding his own regiment of Swiss mercenaries. He abandoned his military career in 1642 at the rank of Lieutenant Field Marshal (equivalent to a lieutenant general).

In 1642, he returned to Uri and became active in local politics. 1643 the emperor named Zwyer his official envoy in the Confederacy. From 1644 to 1659, he filled the top positions in Uri: he was one of the two representatives of Uri at the Tagsatzung, the federal council of the Old Swiss Confederacy, and from 1647 on also the Landammann (head of state) of the canton. In 1648, the Tagsatzung designated him and Johann Rudolf Wettstein, the mayor of Basel, the official negotiators of the Confederacy at the Treaty of Westphalia with the task to ensure the formal exemption of the Confederacy from the Holy Roman Empire. In winter 1650/51, the two were also sent on a diplomatic journey to Emperor Ferdinand III in order to achieve the liberation of some goods from the German Court.

During the Swiss peasant war of 1653, Zwyer commanded the joint troops of the city of Lucerne and Uri, putting down the revolt in the Entlebuch valley in the canton of Lucerne. Three years later, he again commanded Catholic troops in the First war of Villmergen, when he led the defence of Rapperswil against attack from Zurich troops but refused to take direct offensive action himself.
