= First War of Villmergen =

Swiss religious war in 1656

- Part of European wars of religion
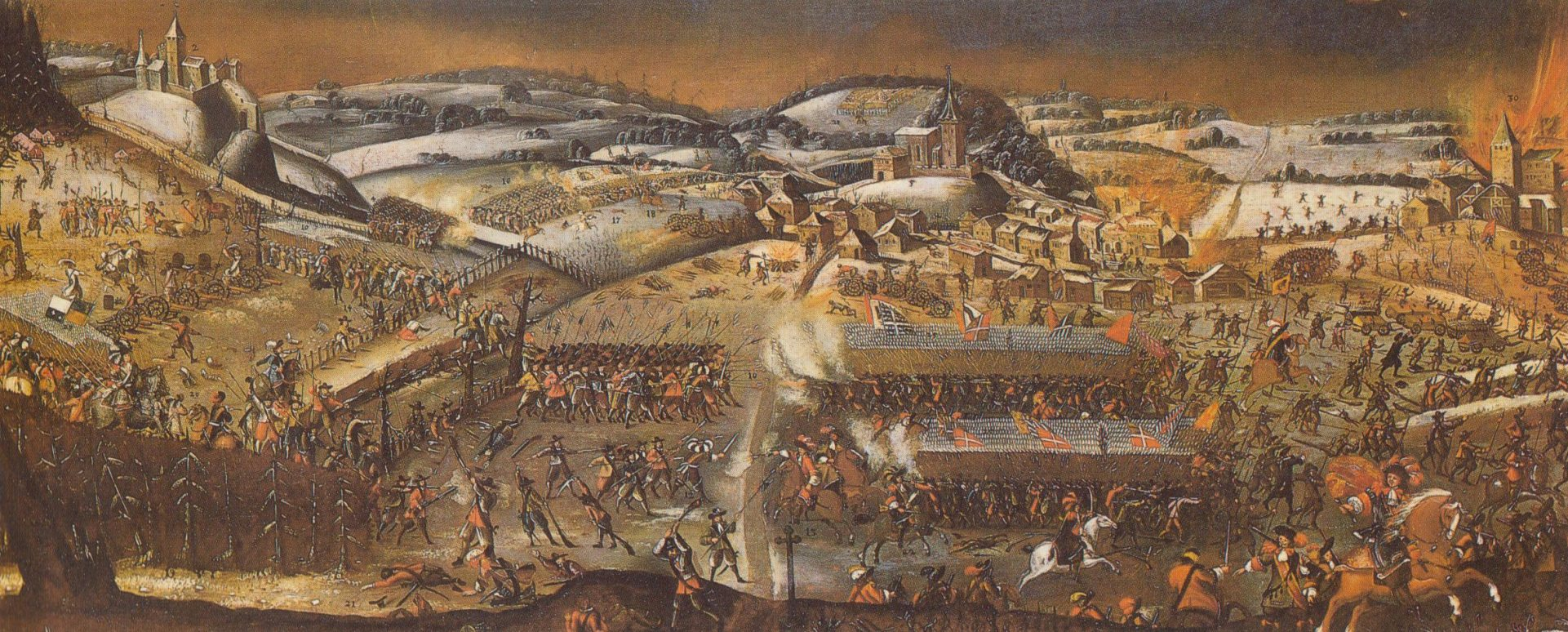
- Painting of the First Battle of Villmergen by Franz Ludwig Raufft, c. 1700
Date	5 January – 7 March 1656 (2 months and 2 days)
Location	Old Swiss Confederacy
Result	Catholic victory: Third Landfrieden; Status quo ante bellum

Belligerents
Zürich; Bern; Schaffhausen	Lucerne; Uri; Schwyz; Unterwalden; Zug

Commanders and leaders
Hans Rudolf Werdmüller; Sigmund von Erlach	Christoph Pfyffer von Altishofen

The First War of Villmergen was a Swiss religious war which lasted from 5 January until 7 March 1656, at the time of the Old Swiss Confederacy. On one side were the Protestant cantons of Zürich and Bern, on the other the Catholic cantons of Central Switzerland. The Protestants tried to break the political hegemony of the Catholics, that had been in existence ever since the Second Kappel Landfrieden of 1531. The casus belli was the expulsion and execution of Protestants from the Schwyz commune of Arth. The Zürcher unsuccessfully besieged the Central Swiss-allied city of Rapperswil and thereby drove their forces together. The Bernese were defeated and repelled in the First Battle of Villmergen. The Third Landfrieden ended the conflict and restored the pre-war balance of power.

== Background ==
During the Swiss peasant war of 1653, when the governments of the Protestant and Catholic cantons jointly moved against the insurgent peasants, the confessional differences that had existed for over a century were merely temporarily pushed towards the background. In 1654, Mayor of Zürich Johann Heinrich Waser received the task of working out a plan to reorganise the Confederacy. However, the Federal Project of 1655 was rejected by the cantons of Central Switzerland, who viewed it as a threat to their dominance established by the 1531 Second Landfrieden, as a result of the Second War of Kappel. The Central Swiss instead decided to strengthen the Catholic Golden League founded in 1586.

In September 1655, tensions escalated when Protestants living in Arth, a village in the Catholic canton of Schwyz, fled to Zürich and were granted asylum. Schwyz protested that the "Nicodemites" of Arth had received assistance from Zürcher pastors for months, and accused Zürich of encouraging Protestants who remained in Arth to emigrate. On its part, Zürich cricized Schwyz for refusing to negotiate, and threatened to take military action. The Antistes of Zürich, Johann Jakob Ulrich, declared that Swiss Protestants had a sacred duty to take up arms against the "religious tyrants" of Schwyz.

Despite warnings from Bern and Zürich, four Protestants who remained in Schwyz were executed, while three others were delivered to the Inquisition in Milan. Bern then promised military support for Zürich in case negotiations failed. On an extraordinary Federal Diet in December, Zürich demanded that those responsible be punished, that formal apologies be made and the dissolution of the Golden League. When these demands were ignored, Zürich and Bern declared war on 6 January 1656.

The Catholic cantons in Central Switzerland promised Schwyz their support. On the Protestant side, only Bern gave its full-scale help, while Schaffhausen only provided troops for defence. Basel, Fribourg, Solothurn, Appenzell Ausserrhoden, Glarus, the Three Leagues and St. Gallen remained neutral.

== War ==
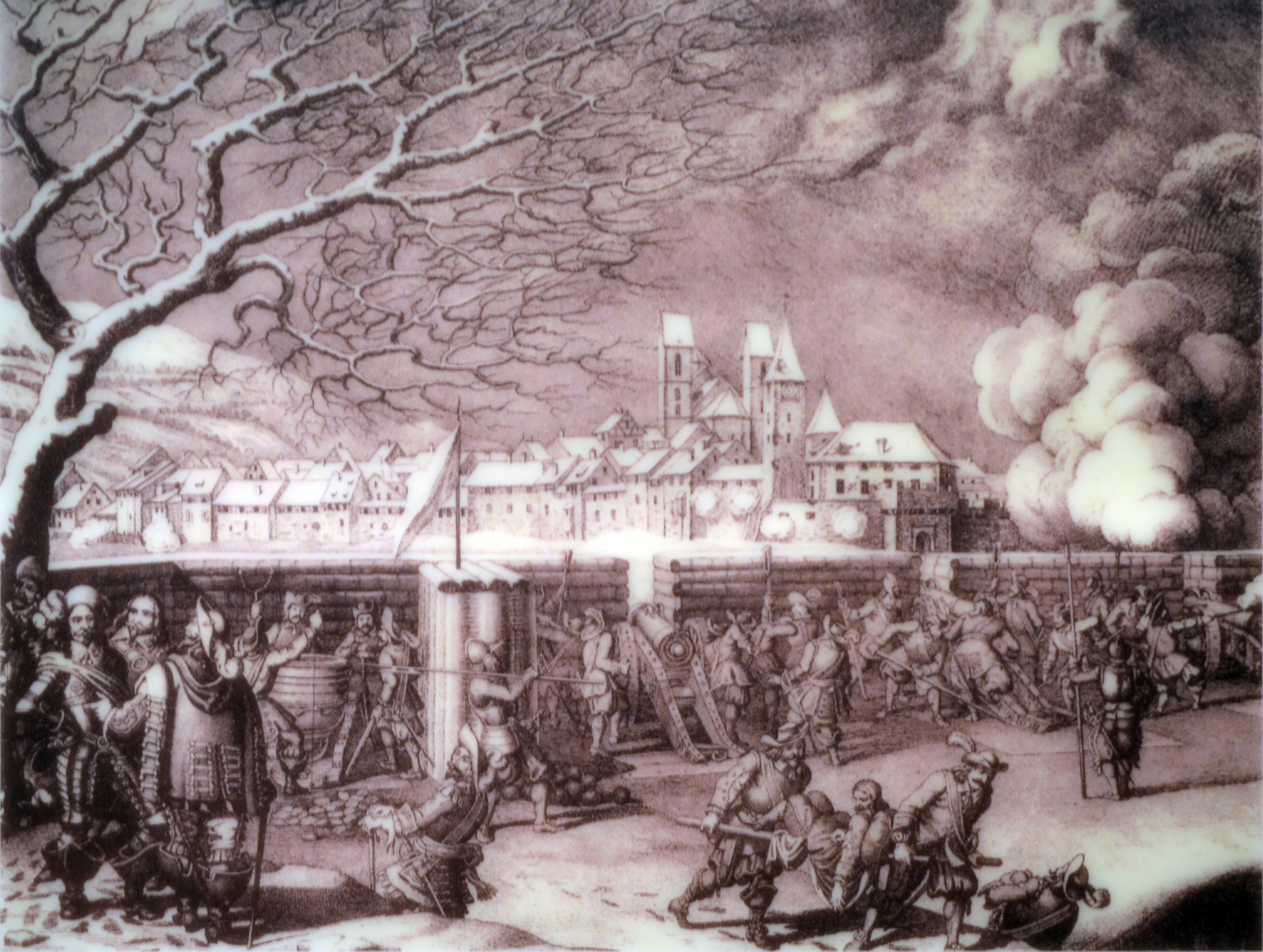
The Siege of Rapperswil from the perspective of Zürich's troops, drawing by Hans Jakob Oeri, 1855

Even a day before the declaration of war, Zürcher battalions marched to Rheinau to plunder the town and Rheinau Abbey. On 7 January, Hans Rudolf Werdmüller led the Zürcher main army to the strategic city of Rapperswil and placed it under siege. Small units took Frauenfeld, Kaiserstuhl, Klingnau and Zurzach, while others entrenched themselves at Oberwil and Kappel am Albis. The Schaffhausers lined up between Wädenswil and Hütten.

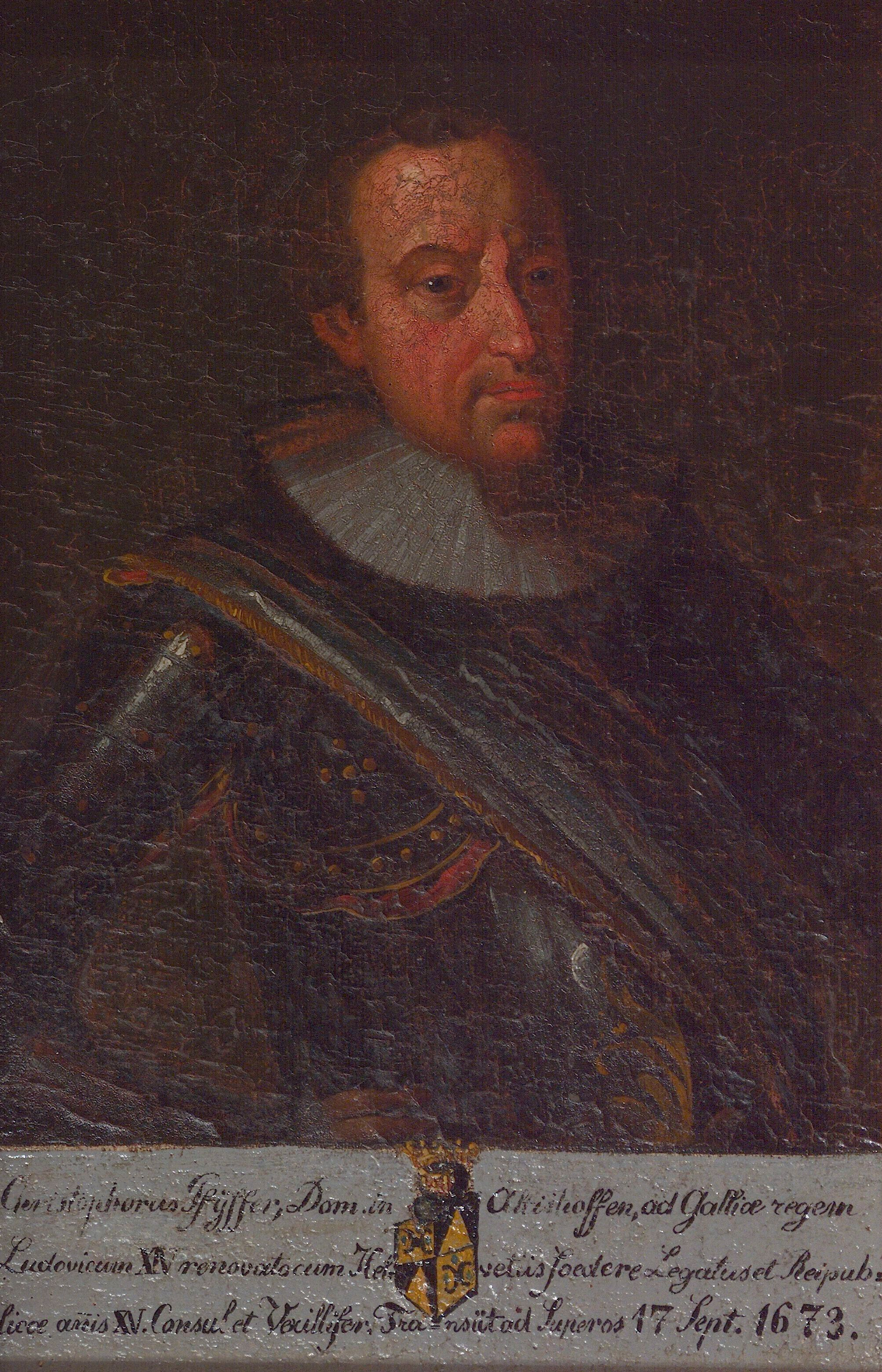
Christoph Pfyffer von Altishofen, commander of the Catholic army at the First Battle of Villmergen

Bern mobilised on 8 January and was initially on its own. About two thirds of its soldiers were needed to guard the borders with its Catholic neighbours. The remaining soldiers moved towards Aarau under the command of Sigmund von Erlach. They intended to join forces with the Zürcher there, however, those were still engaged in the unfavourably developing siege of Rapperswil. On the Catholic side, Christoph Pfyffer von Altishofen of Lucerne was appointed commander-in-chief of the army. All troops from Lucerne and Zug that were not already summoned to guard the borders, gathered in Muri and united at Boswil with battalions from the Freie Ämter.

On 24 January 1656, at the decisive Battle of Villmergen, Lucernese and Zuger troops led by Pfyffer launched a surprise attack on Erlach's Bernese army that had arrived at Villmergen in the early evening. Despite their numerical and weapon-technical inferiority, the Catholics were able to repel them, to which the lack of coordination among the Bernese contributed a large part. The battle prevented the Protestants from occupying the Freie Ämter which separated Bern and Zürich. After a final assault on Rapperswil on 3 February failed, the governments of Bern and Zürich opened peace talks. In the following weeks, several smaller skirmishes and attacks on the populace happened.

== Aftermath ==
Peace negotiations were mediated by the cantons of Fribourg, Solothurn, Basel, and Schaffhausen, as well as by foreign diplomats, most notably the French ambassador Jean de La Barde. In the resulting Third Landfrieden on 7 March, both parties agreed to cease hostilities, grant amnesty for misconduct committed during the war and to return to the status quo ante bellum. Moreover, all troops were withdrawn, prisoners-of-war released and the erected redoubts distmantled. Every canton obtained the right to maintain the status quo concerning religion. Controversial issues such as damage compensations were transferred to an arbitral tribunal, but bad blood within the commission caused many cases to remain unresolved. The actual direct cause of the war, the Protestant refugees from Arth, was disregarded.

The Third Landfrieden confirmed the balance of power that had been established by the 1531 Second Landfrieden, with the political dominance of the Catholic cantons within the Confederacy. Catholics would retain their hegemony until the Toggenburg War of 1712, also known as the Second War of Villmergen.

== See also ==
- First War of Kappel (1529)
- Second War of Kappel (1531)
- Toggenburg War or Second War of Villmergen (1712)
- Sonderbund War (1847)

== Literature ==
- (in German) Hans Rudolf Fuhrer, "Villmerger Kriege 1656/1712", in Militärgeschichte zum Anfassen 19 (Bern 2005). Militärische Akademie der ETH Zürich/Bundesamt für Bauten und Logistik.
