= Johannes Salat =

Swiss writer and mercenary

Johannes Salat (also Hans Salat, Hans Seiler, born 1498 in Sursee, died before 23 October 1561) was a Swiss chronicler, dramatist and mercenary.

Much of his life is documented in his diary entries, covering the years 1517 to 1550. A rope-maker by education, he may also have attended the Latin college in Sursee. He lived in Zürich during 1511 to 1519, and again in Sursee during 1519/20 before moving to Lucerne, where he lived during the 1520s and 1530s, during 1522 to 1527 intermittently participating in several military campaigns in French service in the Italian Wars as quartermaster, and in the Musso war in the service of Lucerne. He was also present in the Wars of Kappel against Protestant Zürich in 1529 and 1531.

He received Lucerne citizenship in 1529 (after the First War of Kappel), and from 1531 he worked as secretary to the Lucerne court of justice, a prestigious position earlier held by other notable Swiss chroniclers (Melchior Russ, Petermann Etterlin), and published literary works, often of a polemical and satirical nature. He also compiled historical works commissioned by the Catholic cantons of the Swiss Confederacy. He attacked the reformation in his 1531 Tanngrotz (a term for "fir-sprig", the badge of the Catholic troops). When Heinrich Bullinger reacted in a pamphlet Salz zum Salat (i.e. "salt for the salad", punning on Salat's surname), he followed up with the much more acrimonious Triumphus Herculis Helvetici which portrayed Zwingli and his Reformation as an obscene Witches' Sabbath. In 1537, Salat published a more conciliatory "book of warning to the Thirteen Cantons". Salat was also in charge of several dramatic performances during his time at Lucerne, the most notable of which was the Easter play at Lucerne in 1538.

He lost his employment in Lucerne due to fraud in 1540 and worked in Fribourg as school-master during the 1540s. He does not appear to have fared well in Fribourg, repeatedly imploring the Lucerne authorities to let him return, even threatening to change his allegiance to the Protestant camp should they refuse. In 1547 he lost his post as a school-master due to the performance of a students' play that was considered lewd. From that time, he survived offering his services as a leech, alchemist and astrologist, until he was allowed to return to Sursee in 1552 after which there are no more records of him. He was dead by October 1561.

== Bibliography ==
- 1531 Tanngrotz, ein schöner Spruch von dem Krieg der fünf Orte (versified account of the Second War of Kappel from the Catholic perspective; Tanngrotz is a word for "fir-sprig", the badge of the Catholic troops during the wars of Reformation; ed. Baechtold 1876).
- 1532, Triumphus Herculis Helvetici ("the triumph of the Swiss Hercules", in satirical reference to Ulrich Zwingli, preserved in a 17th-century copy; compares the Reformation to a Witches' Sabbath)
- Chronicle of the Swiss Reformation, 1517–34 (ed. Ruth Jörg, Zürich 1986, e-helvetica copy)
- 1537 Der verlorene Sohn ("the prodigal son", drama, ed. in: Walter Haas; Martin Stern: Fünf Komödien des 16. Jahrhunderts. Bern 1989, 61–181)
- 1537 Eyn nutzlichs biechlin in warnungs wyss, an die XIII Ort (polemical treatise)
- Life of Niklaus von Flüe, published as:
  - 1537 Rechte ware History, Legend und leben des frommen, ... Nicolausen von der Flü, gebornenn Landsman ob dem Wald inn Underwalden... (Augsburg), ed. Franz Josef Schiffmann as Das Leben des sel. Bruder Klaus von Johannes Salat, Gerichtsschreiber in Lucern in: Geschichtsfreund 23, 1868, 107-153.
  - 1571 Warhafftige wunderbarliche Histori und Leben des recht frommen andächtigen Gottseligen weytberümpten Nicolausen von der Flü... (Dillingen)
- Diary (ed. Baechtold 1876)
