= Franz Ludwig Raufft =

German Baroque painter (1660–1719)

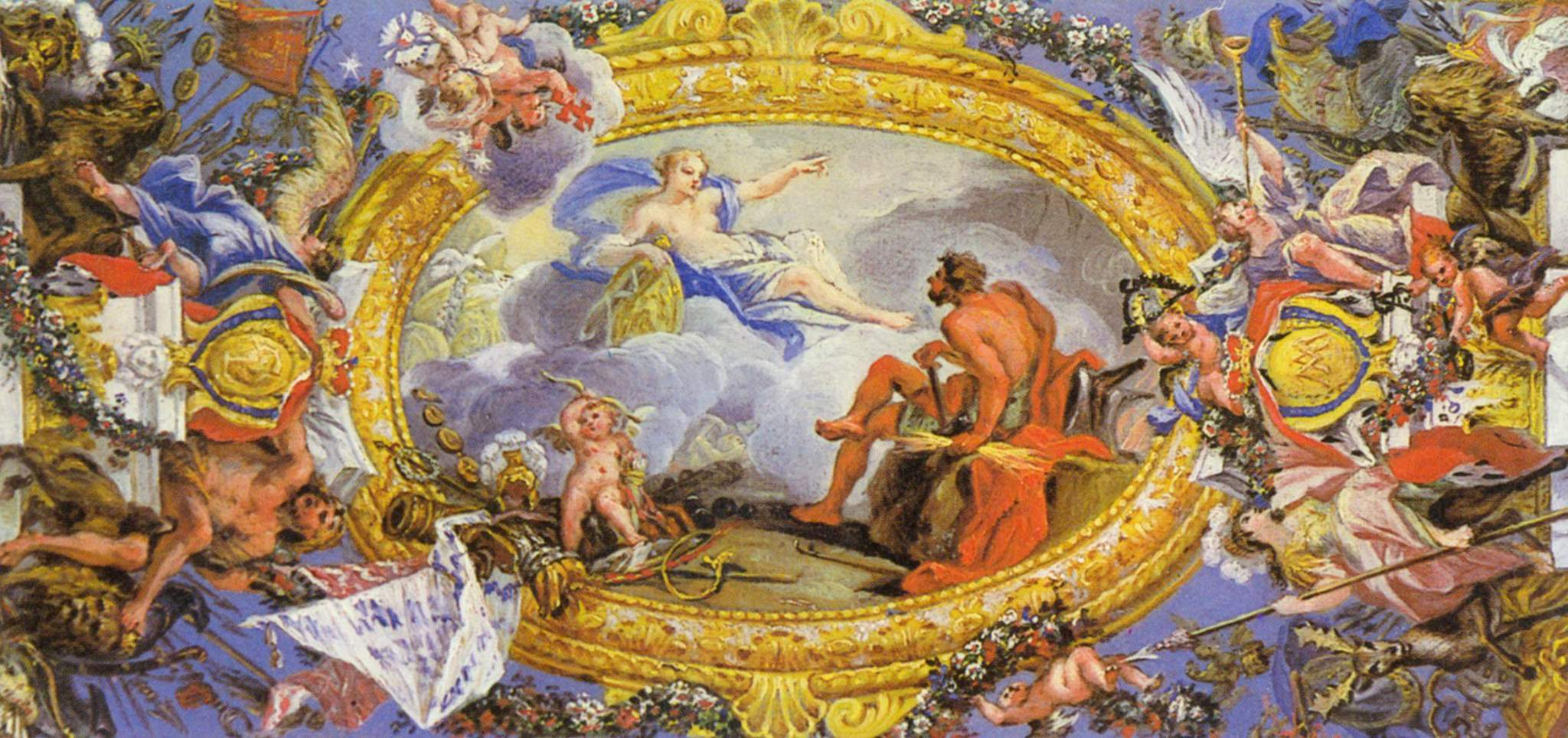
Design for a ceiling painting in Orangerie (Kassel)

Franz Ludwig Raufft (5 October 1660 in Luzern – 1719 in Kassel), was a German Baroque painter. He was the son of the decoration painter Melchior Raufft (born 11 February 1635) or of the portrait painter Martin Raufft.

According to Houbraken he joined the Bentvueghels with the nickname "Fondament". He painted historical allegories and ceiling decorations for the Landgraaf Hessenkessel. He lived with Goudsbloem (Christian Berentz) in Hamburg after a period in Rome.

According to the RKD he lived in Paris, Rome, Hamburg, and the Hague before moving to Kassel.

== Selected works ==
- Beheading of John the Baptist, not dated, oil on canvas, 249.5 x 171 x 9.5 cm, Kunstmuseum Luzern, previously town hall, Lucerne
- Christ on the Mount of Olives (sepia image) and navy, Meyer-am Rhyn Collection, Lucerne
- Battle of VW-mergen (dated 1656), Korporationsverwaltung, Lucerne
- St. Ambrose appears to the Milanese in a Battle in 1338 and drives away the enemies (oil sketch for an altarpiece), ca. 1680, oil on canvas, 52.5 x 41.5 x 5 cm, Kunstmuseum Luzern, deposit of BEST Art Collection, Lucerne
