= Werner Otto Leuenberger =

Swiss artist (1932–2009)

Werner Otto Leuenberger (W.O.L.) (Bern, Switzerland, 21 December 1932 – Bern, Switzerland, 11 April 2009) was a Swiss painter, illustrator, graphic artist and sculptor. He lived and worked in Bern.

He is famous for his quote: "Ich nehme alles auf, ich eliminiere nichts, all das geht unter die Haut – und dann muss ich es malen" (I absorb all, I eliminate nothing, everything goes under my skin – and then I have to paint)

== Books ==
AA.VV., W.O.L. – Werner Otto Leuenberger, Benteli Verlag, Bern
