= Hans Emmenegger (peasant leader) =

Swiss peasant leader (1604–1653)

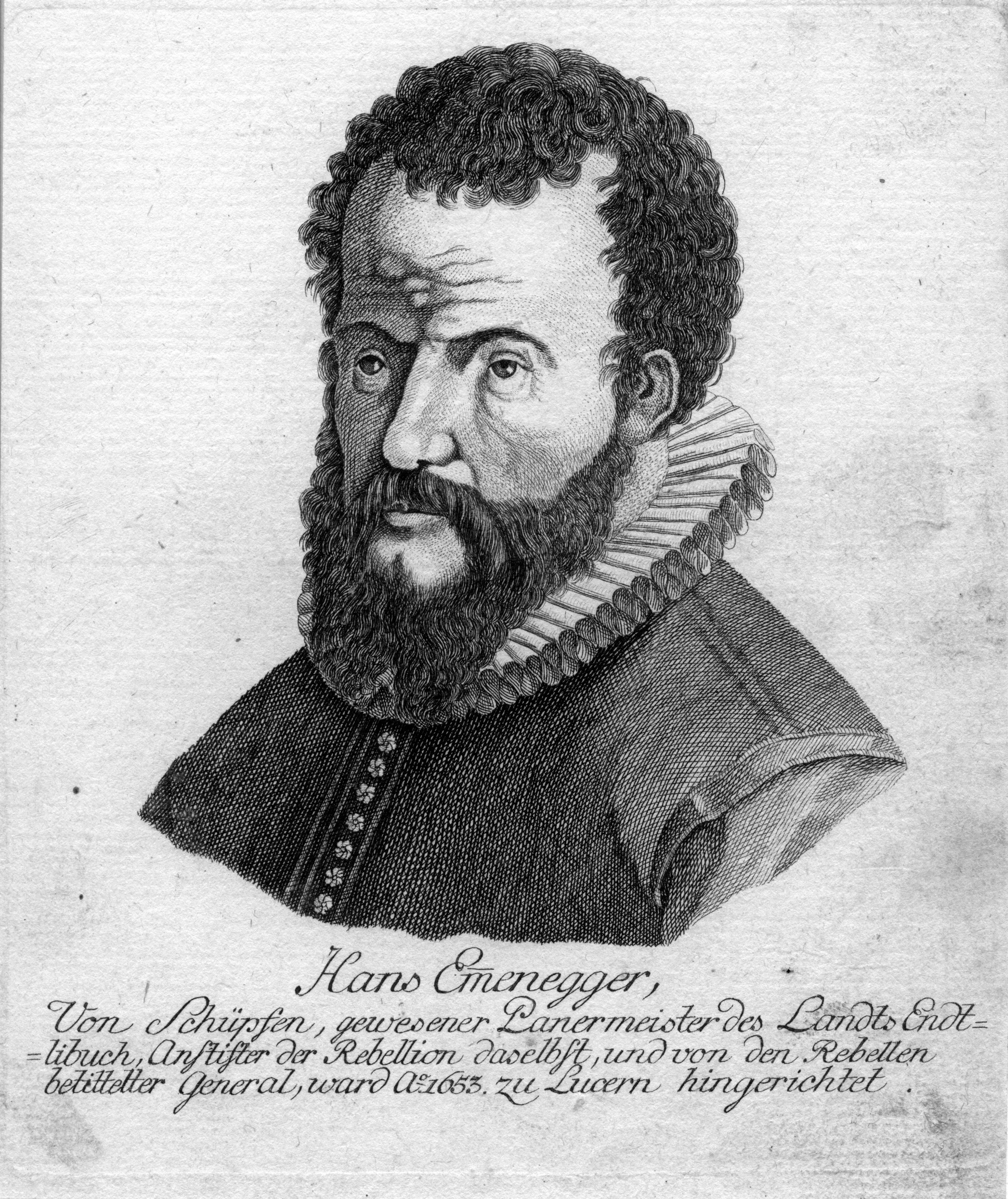
- Engraved portrait
- Born: 7 June 1604; Schüpfheim, Lucerne, Old Swiss Confederacy
- Died: 23 July 1653 (aged 49); Lucerne, Old Swiss Confederacy
- Cause of death: Execution by hanging
- Occupation: Farmer
- Known for: Leader of the Entlebuch peasants in the Swiss peasant war of 1653
- Spouse: Margaretha Krummenacher (m. 1628)
- Parents: Melchior Emmenegger (father); Barbara Zemp (mother)

Hans Emmenegger (7 June 1604 – 23 July 1653) was a Swiss farmer and peasant leader from Schüpfheim in the Entlebuch. In 1645 he was captain of the Land of the Entlebuch and in 1650 banneret. In the Swiss peasant war of 1653 he was the eloquent figure with whom the people of the Entlebuch identified, and their leader, although his political aims were unclear. He was colonel general of the peasants at Sumiswald and Huttwil. He was sentenced to death for high treason and hanged in Lucerne on the same day.

== Biography ==
Hans Emmenegger was born on 7 June 1604 in Schüpfheim, the son of Melchior Emmenegger (died 1614), a farmer and ensign of the Land (Landesfähnrich), and Barbara Zemp. In 1628 he married Margaretha Krummenacher.

Emmenegger farmed his father's farm of Siggenhusen together with other properties, with a total value of 30,600 guilders. He gave 500 guilders toward the building of the church in Schüpfheim, and in 1640 he donated a bell.

In 1634 Emmenegger was usher (Weibel) in the district (Amt) of Schüpfheim, in 1645 captain of the Land (Landeshauptmann) of the Entlebuch, and in 1650 banneret (Landespannermeister). After he called for a refusal of the oath in 1635, he was pardoned only at the request of his family. Remarks on the system of pensions (Pensionenwesen) earned him a fine of 300 guilders.

In the peasant war of 1653 Emmenegger was the eloquent figure with whom the people of the Entlebuch identified, and their leader, although his political aims were unclear. He was colonel general (Generaloberst) of the peasants at Sumiswald and Huttwil. He was sentenced to death for high treason and hanged in Lucerne on the same day, 23 July 1653.

== Bibliography ==
- A. Suter, Der schweizerische Bauernkrieg von 1653, 1997
