= Sigmund von Erlach =

Swiss military commander and a politician in Bern

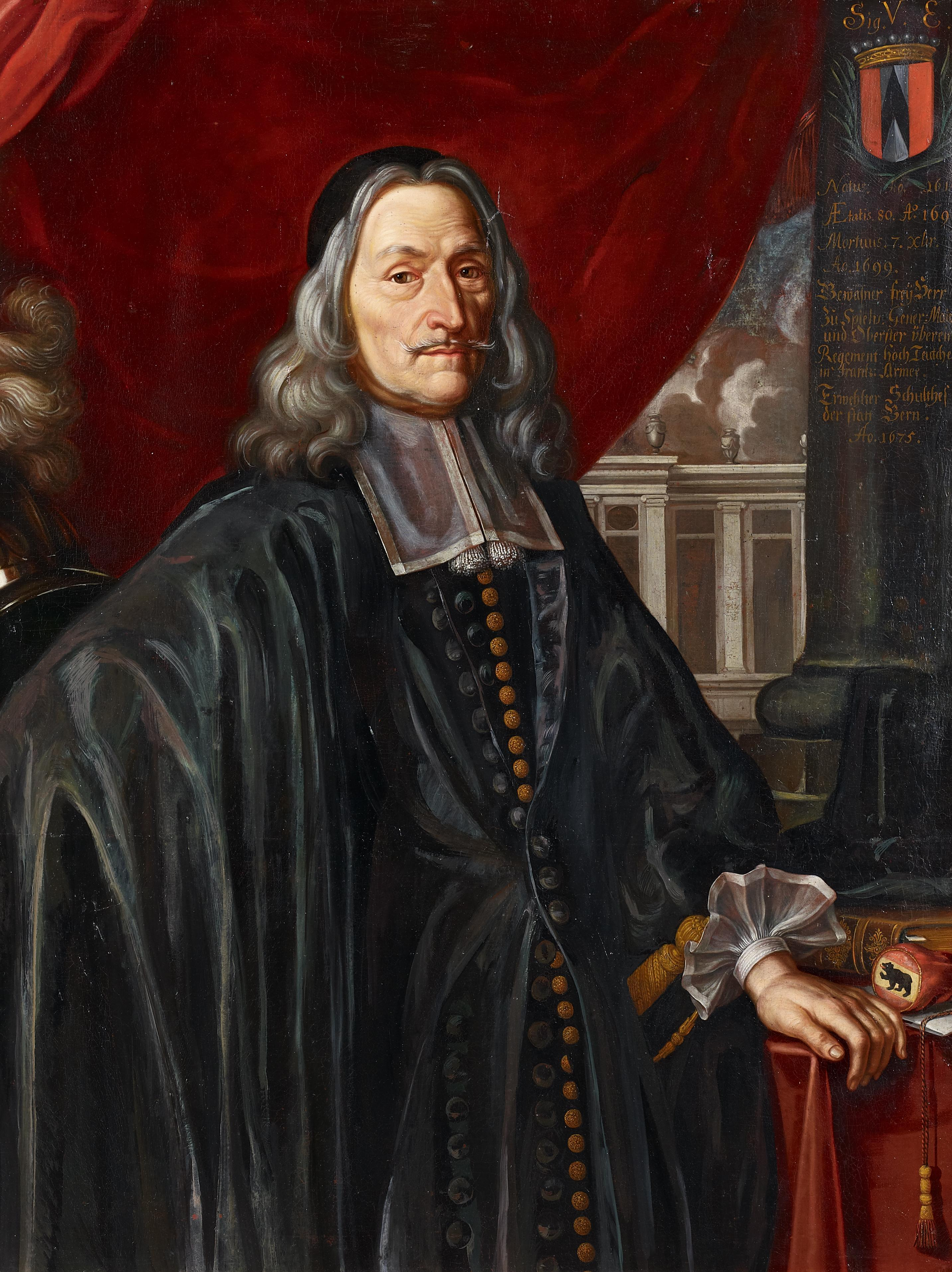
Sigmund von Erlach as Schultheiss of Bern, 1694

Sigmund von Erlach (October 3, 1614 – December 7, 1699), sometimes given as Sigismund von Erlach, was a Swiss military commander and a politician in Bern.

A member of the Erlach family, one of the foremost families of the city, he initially pursued a military career as a mercenary commander, first in the services of Bernhard of Saxe-Weimar and later in France. After he returned to Bern in 1645, he became a member of the canton's Grand Council, and seven years later, he became a member of the city council (Kleiner Rat).

Sigmund von Erlach commanded the Bernese troops in the Swiss peasant war of 1653 by putting down the rebellion of the rural population with force. He also commanded the troops of Bern in the First War of Villmergen, a religiously motivated civil war in the Old Swiss Confederacy that the Protestant cantons lost. Although he was criticised heavily for his failure in that conflict, he continued his political career in Bern, which culminated in 1675 with his election to the post of Schultheiss (mayor).
