= Hans Conrad Werdmüller =

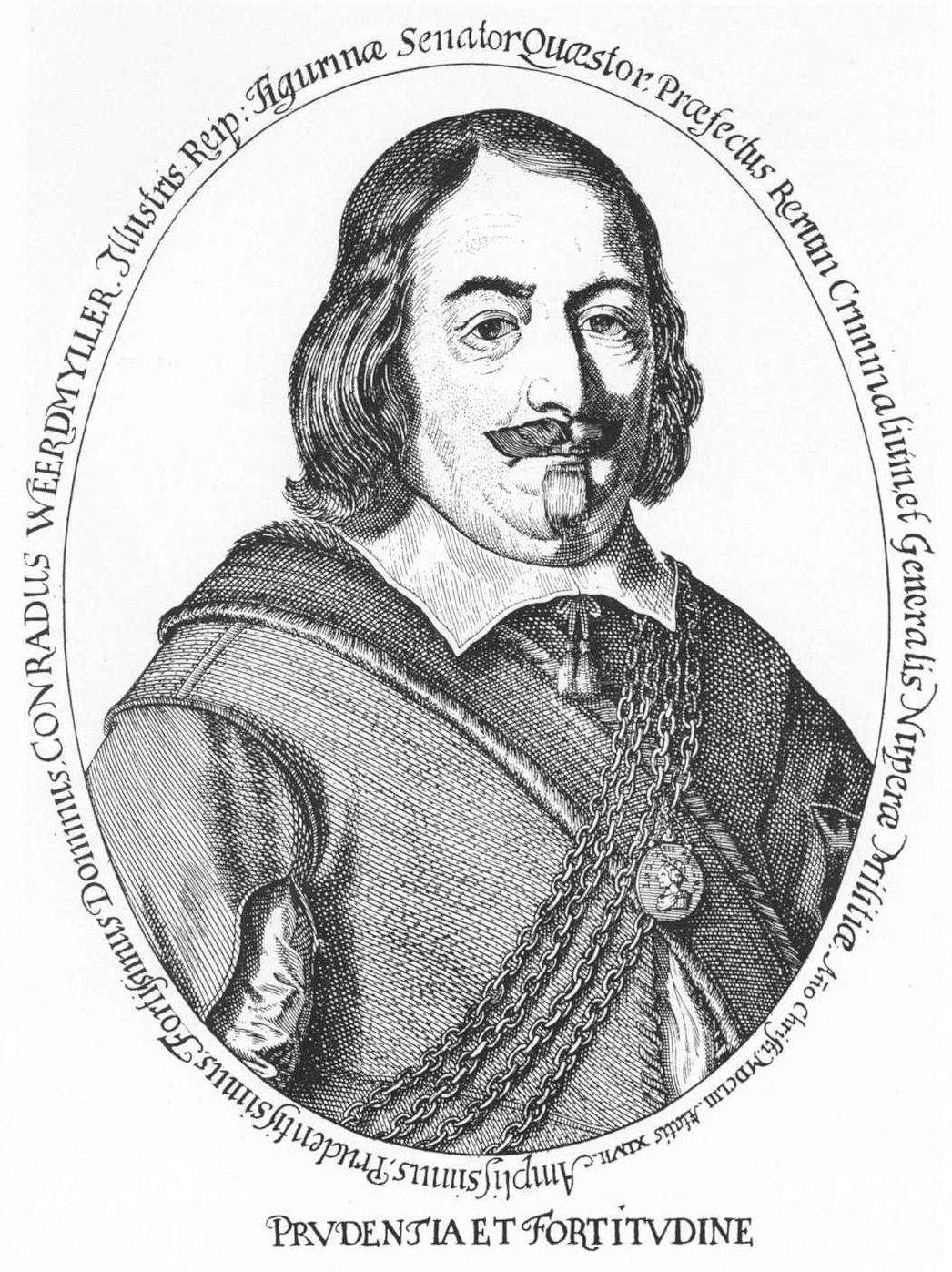
17th-century engraving by Conrad Meyer

Hans Conrad Werdmüller (Zürich, 20 July 1606 – Zürich, 30 July 1674) was a Swiss military commander and a member of the city council of Zürich.

== Biography ==
Werdmüller was the son of Christoph Werdmüller, a member of the Grand Council of Zürich, and Anna Jegglin. He studied at Zürich and Geneva. Werdmüller fought in the Valtellina War as a mercenary in French service, then served Frederick V, Margrave of Baden-Durlach from 1629 to 1631. Appointed captain in 1632, his military talents brought him to the rank of colonel. Werdmüller commanded the troops of Zürich during the Wädenswil revolt of 1646 and the Swiss peasant war of 1653. He was responsible for the 17th-century reorganization of Zürich's defenses, most notably through the introduction of cavalry.
