= First War of Kappel =

1529 armed conflict in Switzerland

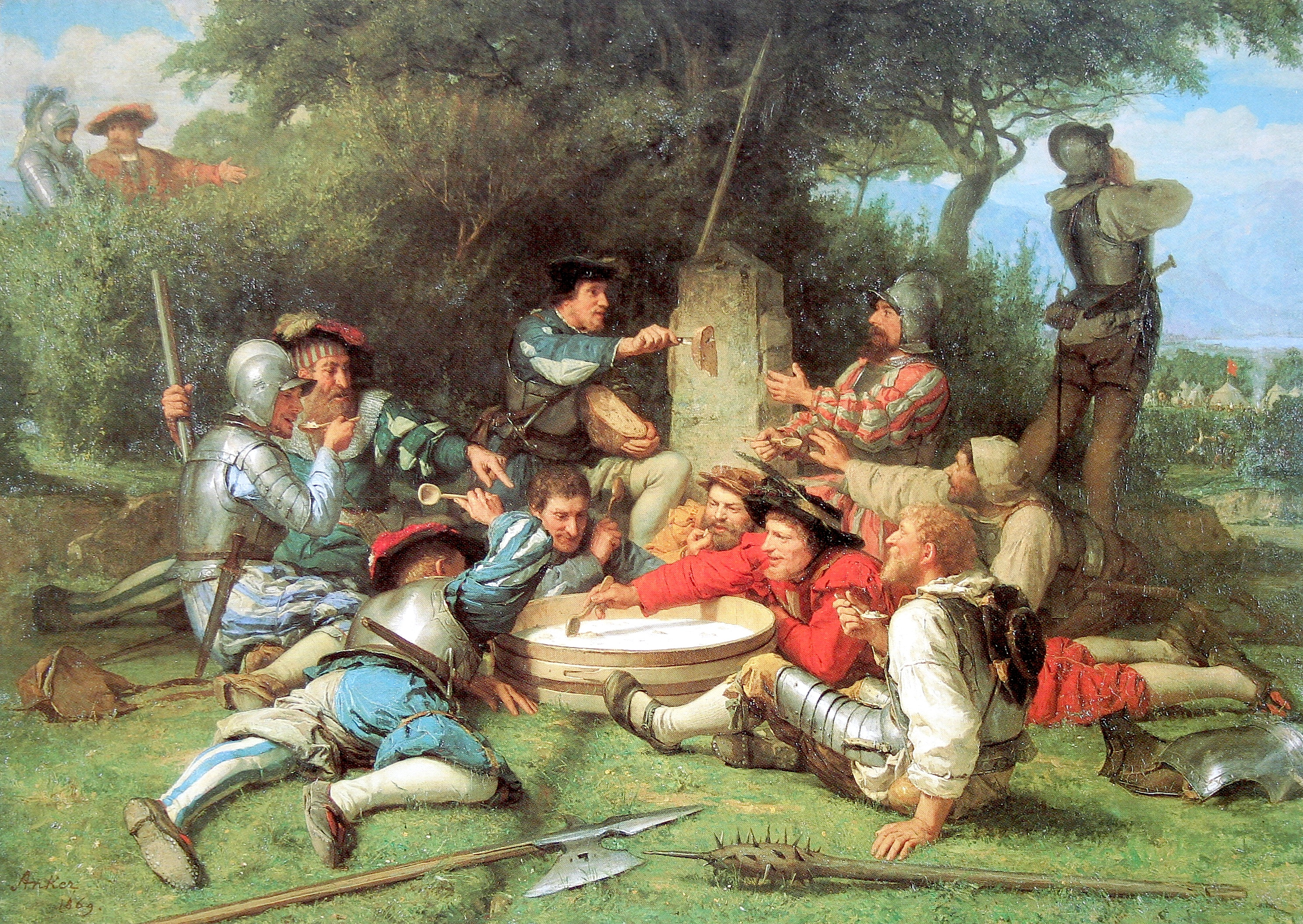
The Kappeler Milchsuppe, from an 1869 painting

The First War of Kappel (Erster Kappelerkrieg) was an armed conflict in 1529 between the Protestant and the Catholic cantons of the Old Swiss Confederacy during the Reformation in Switzerland. It ended, without any single battle having been fought, with the first peace of Kappel (Erster Landfriede).

== Background ==
Led by Huldrych Zwingli, the Protestant Canton and City of Zürich had concluded with other Protestant cantons a defensive alliance, the Christliches Burgrecht, which also included the free imperial cities of Konstanz and Strasbourg. The Catholic cantons responded by forming an alliance with Ferdinand of Austria.

Conflicts between the two religions arose also over the situation in their territories, especially the Thurgau, where the administration changed biannually between cantons and so switched between Catholic and Protestant rules. Several mediation attempts failed, such as the disputation of Baden in 1526.

Numerous minor incidents and provocations occurred on both sides, such as a Catholic priest being executed in the Thurgau in May 1528 and the Protestant pastor J. Keyser being burned at the stake in Schwyz in 1529. The last straw was the installation of a Catholic vogt at Baden.

== Course of war ==
Zürich declared war on 8 June, occupied the Thurgau and the territories of the Abbey of St. Gall and marched to Kappel, at the border of Zug.

== Resolution ==
Mediation at the Tagsatzung allowed open warfare to be narrowly avoided. The armies were on the field (the march of Kappel between Zürich and Zug) while negotiations were ongoing, but both armies' soldiers arranged to avoid any provocation. Johannes Salat of Lucerne, an eyewitness, recorded how the men from both camps fraternised, drank and talked together. Heinrich Bullinger later cast that in terms of the Kappeler Milchsuppe ("milk soup of Kappel"), an anecdotal account of how a meal was shared by the two armies, Zürich's providing the bread and Zug's the milk. That became a lasting symbol of reconciliation and compromise between confederates.

== Aftermath ==
The peace agreement (Erster Landfriede) was not favourable for the Catholics, who had to dissolve their alliance with the Austrian Habsburgs. Tensions remained essentially unresolved and would flare up again during the Second War of Kappel, two years later.

== See also ==
- Second War of Kappel (1531)
- First War of Villmergen (1656)
- Toggenburg War or Second War of Villmergen (1712)
- Sonderbund War (1847)
