= Golden League (1586) =

1586 alliance of Swiss Catholic cantons

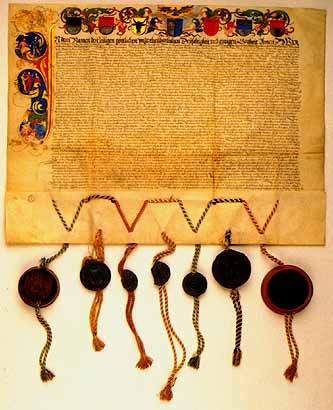
- The Goldener Bund of 1586
- Type: Confessional alliance
- Signed: 5 October 1586
- Location: Lucerne
- Expiry: 1798
- Parties: The seven Catholic cantons: the five inner cantons, Fribourg and Solothurn; Appenzell Innerrhoden from 1600; the Catholic part of Glarus from 1655

The Golden League (German: Goldener Bund), also called the Borromean League (Borromäischer Bund), was an alliance concluded in Lucerne on 5 October 1586 among the seven Catholic cantons of the Old Swiss Confederacy (the five inner cantons plus Fribourg and Solothurn) to preserve the Catholic faith in the Confederacy. It was named after the gilded initial letter of the treaty documents. The parties pledged to remain in the old faith and promised each other help against external or internal dangers. This included the right to intervene if the Catholic faith was endangered within one of the contracting cantons.

== Background ==
The union of the Catholic cantons in the Golden League marks an important stage in the conflicts between the two confessional parties in early modern Switzerland. After the military settlement of the religious and political balance of power in favour of the Catholics in the Second Peace of Kappel (Zweiter Kappeler Landfriede) of 1531, the confessional antagonism persisted. Rising tensions during the Counter-Reformation in the second half of the 16th century and the continuing disputes between the Duke of Savoy and Geneva formed the background to the decision of the five inner cantons to secure mutual support by treaty and to form a closer union with the two exposed Catholic cantons in the west of the Confederacy, Fribourg and Solothurn.

== Later history ==
Appenzell Innerrhoden was admitted to the Golden League in 1600, and the Catholic part of the canton of Glarus in 1655, when the league was renewed. Because Charles Borromeo was declared patron of the league at that time, it also received the name "Borromean League" (Borromäischer Bund). With the end of the Old Swiss Confederacy in 1798, the Golden League also lapsed.

== Bibliography ==
- A. Müller, Der Goldene Bund 1586, 1965
- R. Bolzern, Spanien, Mailand und die katholische Eidgenossenschaft, 1982
