= Second War of Kappel =

1531 battle during the Swiss Reformation

- Part of European wars of religion
- Battle of Kappel, 11 October 1531, by Hans Asper
Date	9 October – 20 November 1531
Location	Old Swiss Confederacy
Result	Catholic victory

Belligerents
Catholics: Uri; Schwyz; Zug; Lucerne; Unterwalden	Protestants: Zürich; Bern; Basel; Schaffhausen

The Second War of Kappel (German: Zweiter Kappelerkrieg) was an armed conflict in 1531 between the Catholic and the Protestant cantons of the Old Swiss Confederacy during the Reformation in Switzerland.

== Background ==
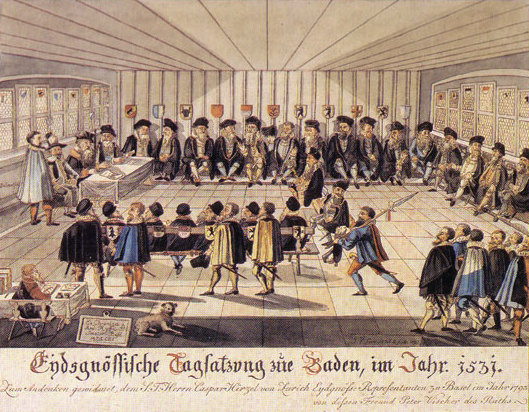
The Tagsatzung of 1531 in Baden failed to mediate between the parties (1790s drawing)

The peace concluded after the First War of Kappel two years earlier had prevented an armed confrontation, but the tensions between the two parties had not been resolved, and provocations from both sides continued, fuelled in particular by the Augsburg Confession of 1530. The Protestant canton of Zürich and Huldrych Zwingli, leader of the Swiss Reformation, feared a military action by Ferdinand I, Archduke of Austria and his brother Charles V, Holy Roman Emperor against Swiss Protestants, and saw the five Catholic cantons of Central Switzerland (Lucerne, Schwyz, Uri, Zug and Unterwalden) as potential allies of the two Habsburg sovereigns. Additionally, the Catholic party accused Zürich of territorial ambitions. While the Federal Diet (Tagsatzung) had successfully mediated in 1529, on this occasion the attempt failed, not least because Zwingli was eager to implement the Reformation throughout the Confederacy.

Since the beginning of 1531, Zürich had called on the five Catholic cantons to allow Protestant worship on their territory, but this was perceived by the Catholics as an attack on their independence and rejected. Meanwhile, as the Catholic cantons refused to help the Three Leagues in the Grisons against the Duchy of Milan during the Musso War of March–April 1531, Zürich promptly considered this a breach of contracts between the Confederacy and the Three Leagues and declared an embargo against the five cantons. Zürich urged its ally Bern to launch a joint military intervention, which it refused. Nevertheless, in May 1531 the two cantons enacted a food embargo against the five cantons, preventing the supply of grain and salt. After the measure failed to pressure the Catholics into concessions, in September Bern suggested lifting the embargo, which caused tensions with Zürich.

== Course of war ==
Pressed by the food embargo, on 9 October 1531 the five Catholic cantons declared war on Zürich and deployed their main army on Zug's border with Zürich, near Kappel am Albis. Zürich's troops were mobilized far too late, and at noon on 11 October, an army of around 2000 men found itself alone against some 7000 soldiers from the five cantons. The bulk of the troops from Zürich arrived only in the course of the afternoon, incomplete, in isolated groups and exhausted from the march. At 4 p.m., the Catholic troops launched an attack and routed the enemy after a brief resistance. Zürich suffered around 500 killed, among them Zwingli, who had accompanied the main army as a military chaplain and whose body was burned as a heretic.

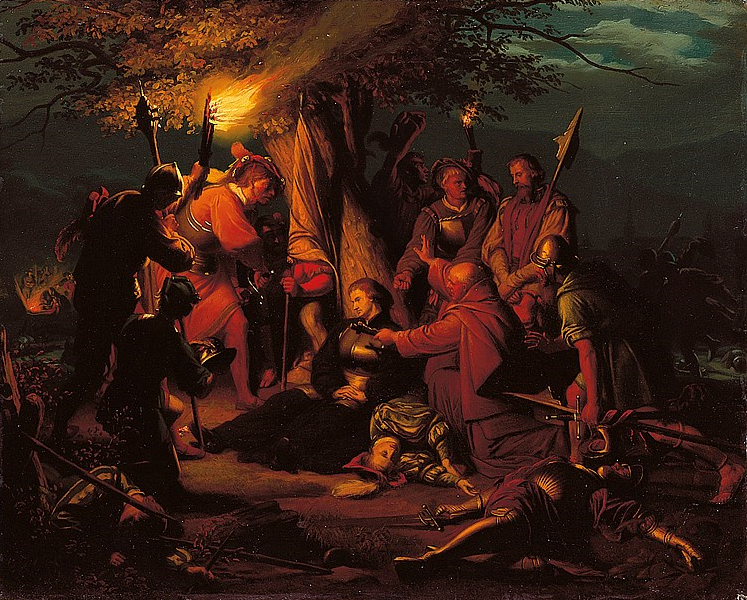
Zwingli's Death on the Battlefield at Kappel, by August Weckesser

After the Battle of Kappel, Bern and other Protestant cantons came to the aid of Zürich. Between 15 and 21 October, a Protestant army, vastly outnumbering the enemy force, marched through the Reuss valley up to the entrance of Baar, and the Catholic troops withdrew to the Zugerberg. The Bernese and the Zürcher command then attempted to advance through Sihlbrugg and Menzingen in order to surround the enemy. The maneuver, which involved around 5,000 men, was delayed by looting and the indiscipline of the soldiers. By the evening of 23 October, the expeditionary force had reached only Gubel Hill, near Menzingen, where it was attacked during the night by a small force from the five cantons and forced to flee after it had sustained heavy casualties.

The renewed defeat led to increasing desertions among the Protestant army, which retreated down the Reuss valley to Bremgarten on 3 November. The withdrawal left Zürich's territories on the left bank of Lake Zürich unprotected and allowed Catholic troops to pillage the area from 6 to 8 November. The canton's military incapability compelled leading figures in both the city of Zürich and the countryside to push for a immediate peace agreement. From the beginning of November, representatives of the cantons that remained neutral (Solothurn, Freiburg, Glarus and Appenzell), as well as French diplomats, had been trying to mediate a peace settlement. In accordance with the military circumstances, the Second Peace in Kappel or Zweiter Landfrieden (Second Territorial Peace), which was concluded on 20 November in the hamlet of Deinikon, near Baar, turned out to be favourable for the Catholics.

== Aftermath ==
Heinrich Bullinger, who had been a teacher at Kappel and since 1523 an outspoken supporter of Zwingli's, at the time of the war was pastor at Bremgarten. Following the Battle of Kappel, Bremgarten was re-catholicized. On 21 October, Bullinger fled to Zürich with his father, and on 9 December was declared Zwingli's successor as leader of the Reformed movement.

In anticipation of the Cuius regio eius religio principle of the 1555 Peace of Augsburg, the Second Peace of Kappel confirmed each canton's right to determine the denomination of its own citizens and subjects, but favored Catholicism in the Confederacy's common territories. With the restoration of the Princely Abbey of Saint Gall, Zürich's territorial ambitions in eastern Switzerland came to an end. The peace treaty determined the dissolution of the Protestant alliance. It also allowed communes or parishes that had already converted to remain Protestant. Only strategically important places such as the Freiamt or those along the route from Schwyz to the Rhine valley at Sargans (and thus to the alpine passes in the Grisons) were forcibly re-Catholicised.

One result of the treaty—probably not anticipated by its signatories—was the long-term establishment of religious coexistence in several Swiss subject territories. In both the territories of Thurgau and Aargau, for example, Catholic and Protestant congregations began worshiping in the same churches, which led to further tensions and conflicts throughout the sixteenth and seventeenth centuries. The treaty also confirmed each canton's right to practice either the Catholic or Reformed faith, thus defining the Swiss Confederation as a state with two religions, a relative exception in Western Europe. The outcome of the war also cemented the main denominations in each of the thirteen cantons of the Old Swiss Confederacy: after later settlements in Glarus and Appenzell, seven full and two half cantons remained Catholic (Lucerne, Uri, Schwyz, Unterwalden, Zug, Fribourg, Solothurn, and half of Glarus and Appenzell), while four and two halves became firmly Swiss Reformed Protestant (Zürich, Bern, Basel, Schaffhausen, and half of Glarus and Appenzell). With the exception of Western Switzerland, the religious geography of the country has remained largely unchanged since the Second Peace of Kappel.

An unsuccessful effort by the Protestant cantons, especially Zürich, to change the terms of confessional coexistence in 1656, the First War of Villmergen, led to a reaffirmation of the status quo in the Dritter Landfrieden (Third Territorial Peace). A second religious civil war in 1712, the Second War of Vilmergen, ended in a decisive Protestant victory and major revisions in the fourth Landfrieden of 1712.

== See also ==
- First War of Villmergen (1656)
- Toggenburg War or Second War of Villmergen (1712)
- Sonderbund War (1847)
- Johannes Salat
