= Waldsteinburg =

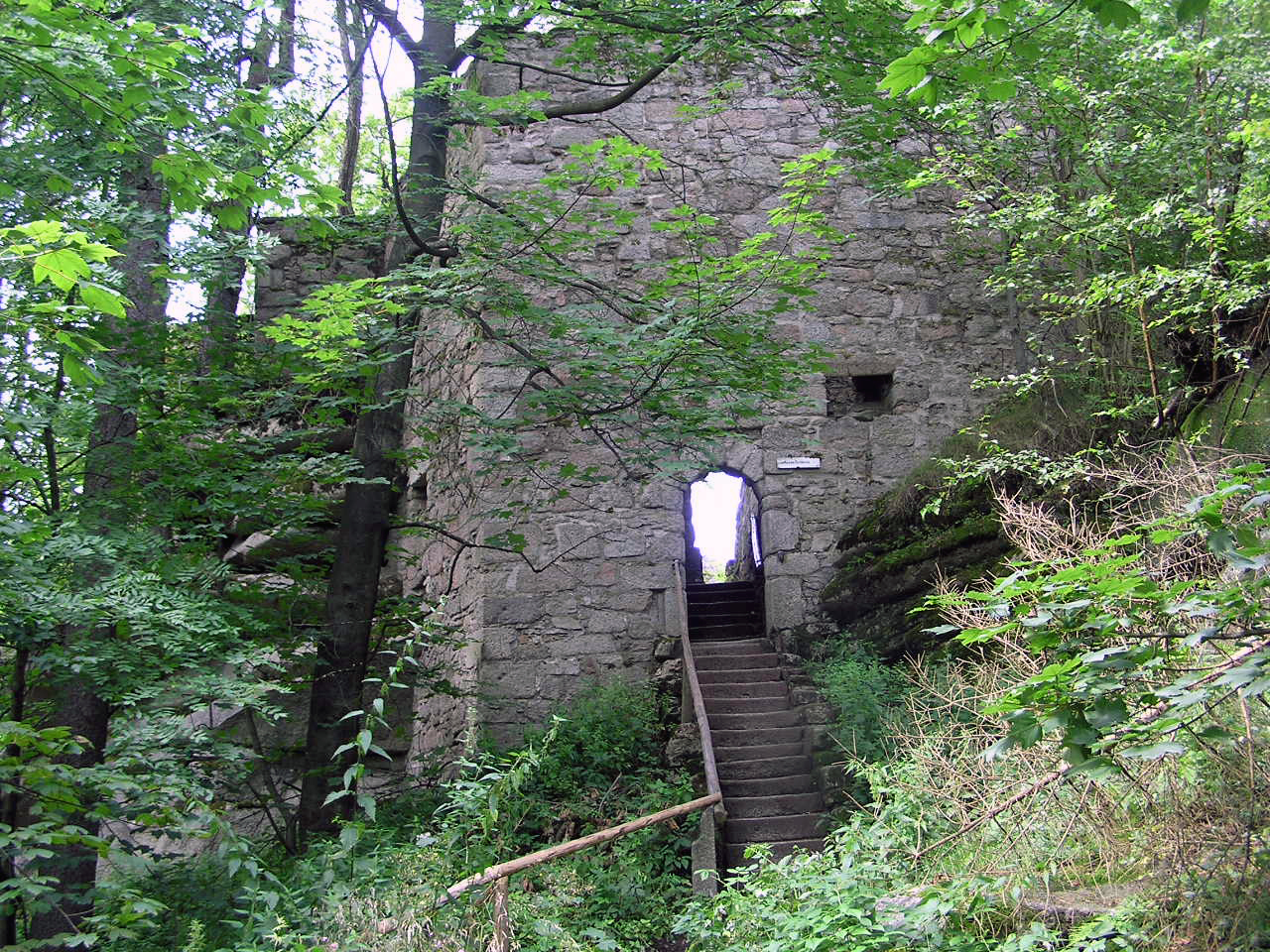
- The castle ruins

- Location within Germany
- Alternative names: Red Castle (Rotes Schloss)

General information
- Classification: Ruins. In 2007 section of wall were broken off
- Location: Zell im Fichtelgebirge
- Coordinates: 50.12889°N 11.855°E
- Completed: first mentioned in 1350; 676 years ago
- Owner: Ritterschaft

Height
- Height: 877 m above sea level (NN)

Technical details
- Structural system: individual rusticated ashlars

The Waldsteinburg, also called the Red Castle (German: Rotes Schloss) is a ruined castle on the summit of the Großer Waldstein in the Fichtel Mountains of Germany. It is also known as the Westburg ('west castle') to distinguish it from the older ruins of the Ostburg ('east castle').

== History ==
The aforementioned Westburg, first recorded in 1350, was built to replace the older Ostburg, which no longer met the requirements for a defensive fortification. Its builders and owners were the knights of Sparneck.

=== House of Sparneck ===
For centuries the lords of Sparneck ruled over a territory, which corresponded roughly to the former district of Münchberg. Waldstein Castle was an integral part of the estate of this once powerful family. The most famous member on the Waldstein was Rüdiger von Sparneck (ca. 1300-1364/68), who in 1336 was elected count palatine of Eger. When the King of Bohemia was crowned as Emperor Charles IV, the centre of power of the Holy Roman Empire moved within easy reach of the Sparnecks and Waldstein Castle played an important role in the power structure of the western Egerland and its surrounding regions. This time is considered the heyday of the lords of Sparneck; and Rüdiger, who had become more powerful, awarded Münchberg the town rights of Nuremberg on 13 July 1364 . His son Hans I of Sparneck was appointed to the chapter of Bamberg on 28 April 1352. Amongst other things, he enfeoffed the Waldstein to Konrad of Neuberg. He succeeded, however, together with his brothers Erhard (1364–1417), Frederick I (1364–1415) and Pabo II (1364–1373) to assume the fief of Waldstein from the emperor.

=== Destruction by the Swabian League in 1523 ===
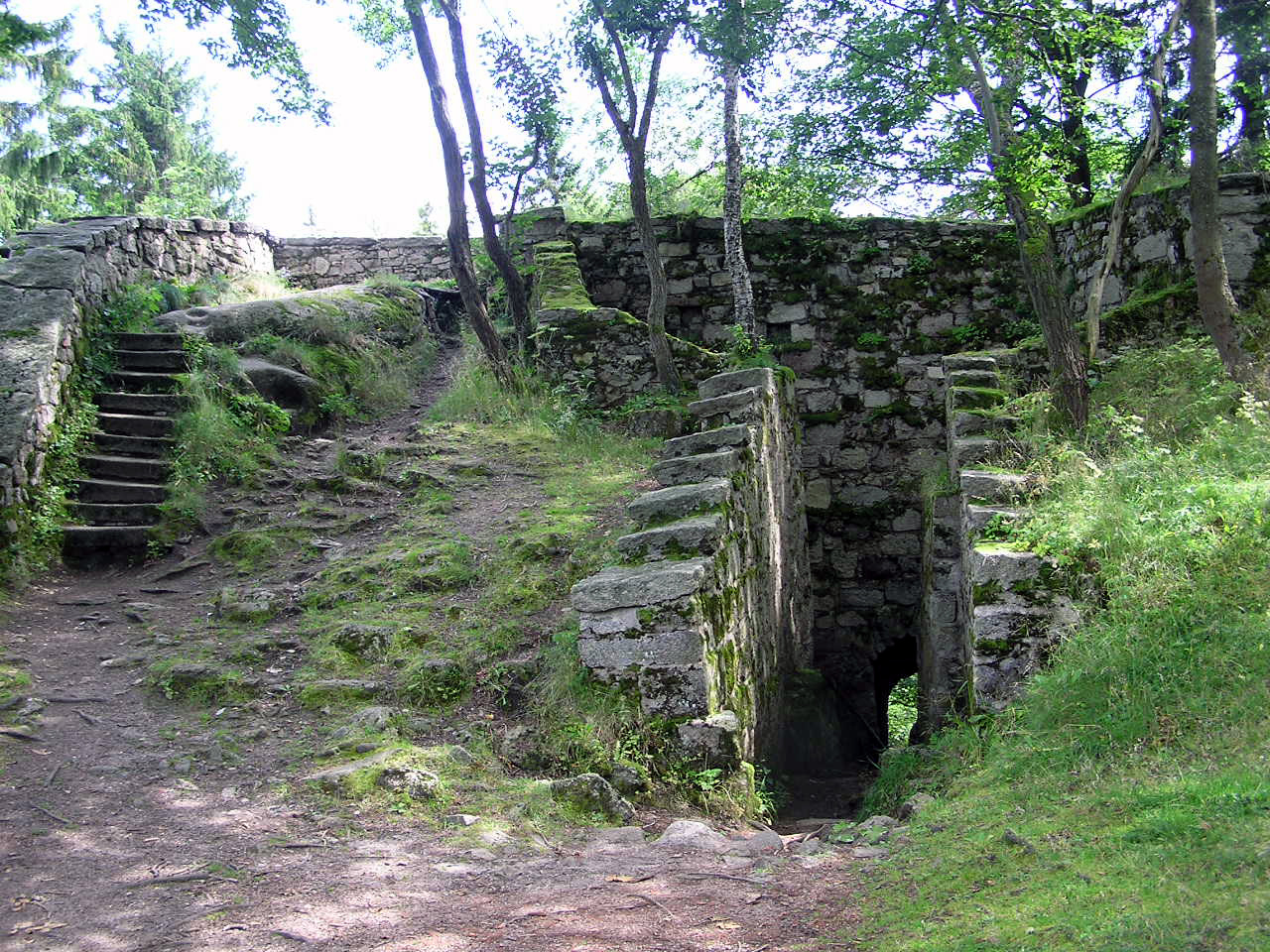
The interior of the main castle

In the middle of the 15th century, many once powerful men operated in a manner which was later referred to a robber baronetcy, in order to keep their estates and if possible to expand them. Thomas von Absberg was particularly noted for this and, around 1500, had terrorized the whole of Franconia. He kidnapped traders on several occasions and demanded a large ransom for their release. On 24 June 1520 he attacked a group of travellers on the Hahnenkamm. Joachim, Count of Oettingen, who was with the group, was so badly wounded in the melee that, on 6 July, he died of his injuries. This event was reported to the Swabian League and to Charles V, who had just been named the "elected" German Emperor; he promptly placed the imperial ban on the Absberg family. Finally, in May 1521, Absberg attacked a group of returnees from the Reichstag in Worms on the Knittling high road. Hans Lamparter of Greiffenstein (the imperial spokesman) and Johann Lucas, who handled financial transactions on behalf of the emperor, fell into his hands. After several stops, the prisoners were brought to the Waldstein, the most secure fortress in the whole Fichtelgebirge, and which belonged to Wolf and Christopher of Sparneck.

In January 1523, after a year and 38 days in captivity, the prisoners succeeded with "the help of God", to escape and reported at Nuremberg that the Sparnecks had helped the Absbergs. On 1 June, a powerful army, comprising 10,000 infantry, 1,000 riders, 100 rifles, and 33 cannon with 900 pounds of gunpowder, was deployed. On 11 July the troops reached Waldstein Castle and razed it down to its foundations. The castle fell into ruin and was never rebuilt by the Sparnecks. The last of the family line died in 1744 in Wunsiedel.

=== Woodcuts by Hans Wandereisen ===
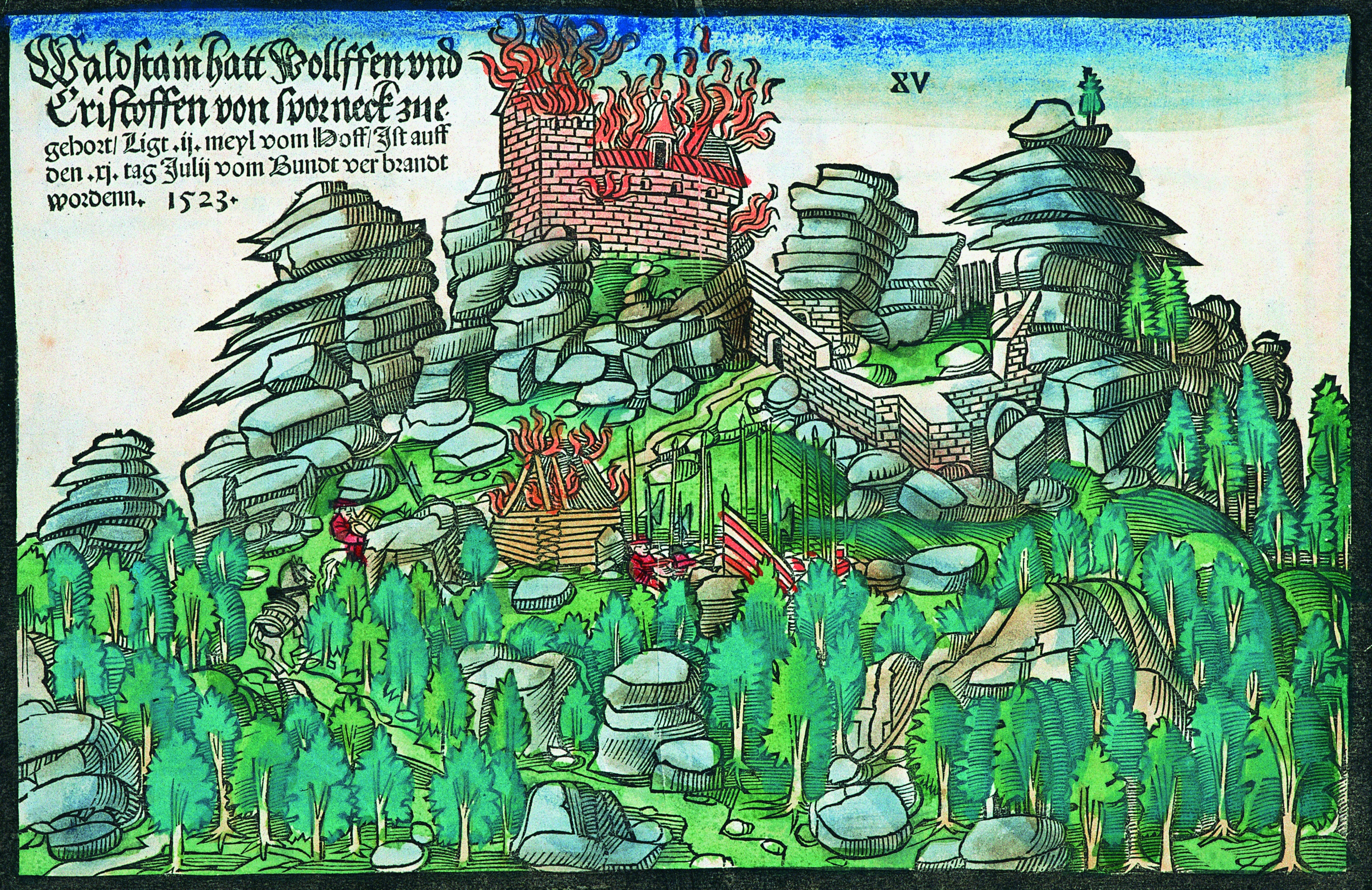
Subsequently coloured woodcut by Hans Wandereisen, 1523

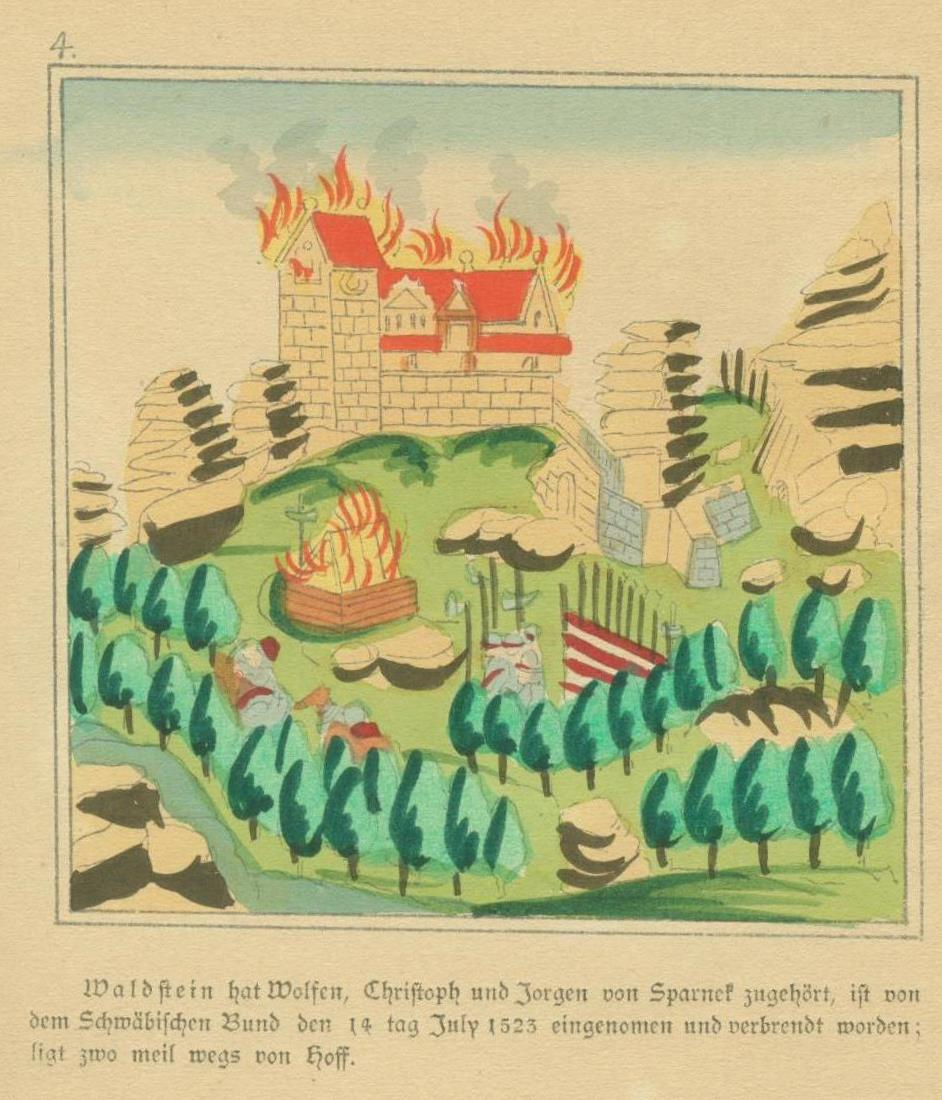
Representation of the woodcut by Joseph von Baader from the 19th century

On a woodcut by war correspondent, Hans Wandereisen, the castle is shown high above the surrounding area. Judging by the number of floors it is rather exaggerated, yet the ruins still stand on an impressive rocky plateau today.

Around the spur the forest is cleared, allowing a view of the troops belonging to the Federation. In the original document, published by Baron von Reizenstein, it talks about a Schaffhausen ('sheep shed'). This can be seen as a wooden house.

If the path is followed, on which a rider and barrels of gunpowder are depicted, uphill is the outer ward, of which is one side of the castle gate still survives. The castle is well fortified on all sides and only at the back can a simple palisade be seen which exploit the natural rock formation. In the left half of the castle, a stone cottage can be seen, which was used as a warehouse, according to Schwarz.

The inner ward consisted of a palace, a gatehouse, a battlement with bartizan (on the woodcut in the centre of the castle and oversized) and a quadratic keep. Access to the inner ward was protected by a drawbridge, which is not visible on the woodcut. Several investigations, including by Karl Dietel, support this hypothesis, however.

=== War files of 1523 ===
Waltstain, ain schloßs der Sparnecker, darauff die gefanngen gelegen, die selbst auskomen sindt durch hilff des almechtigen: Item deßselben tags ist durch Wolffen von Freyburg, einem edlman, so von der statt Augspurg zu haubtmann geordnet was, das schloß Waltstain, so des Cristoffen vnd Jorgen von Sparneckh, gebrüdere gewest, darauff die gefanngen gelegen vnd auskomen sind, nemlich Johann Lampartter und Pamgartner, verprennt vnd die gefengnus mit pulfer zersprenngt vnd zerrißsen. Dasselb schloßs ist gar ein mordtgruben vnd nichts erpauen, an einem wilden ortt in einem walde gelegen, vnd nichts darinn gewest.

Transcription: Waldstein, a castle belonging to the Sparnecks, where the prisoners were held, who escaped by themselves with the help of the Almighty: On the same day, Waldstein Castle, which belonged to the brothers Christopher and Georg von Sparneck, in which the prisoners, namely Lamparter and Johann Baumgärtner were kept and escaped, is razed by Christoph von Freyburg, a gentleman, appointed as Hauptmann to the city of Augsburg, and the prison blown up with gunpowder and wrecked. This castle is a death pit and was built at a wild, remote spot in a forest. There was nothing else there to be found. (The Sparnecks fled before the approaching troops, and took with them what they could carry)

=== Watchtower in the Spanish War of Succession ===
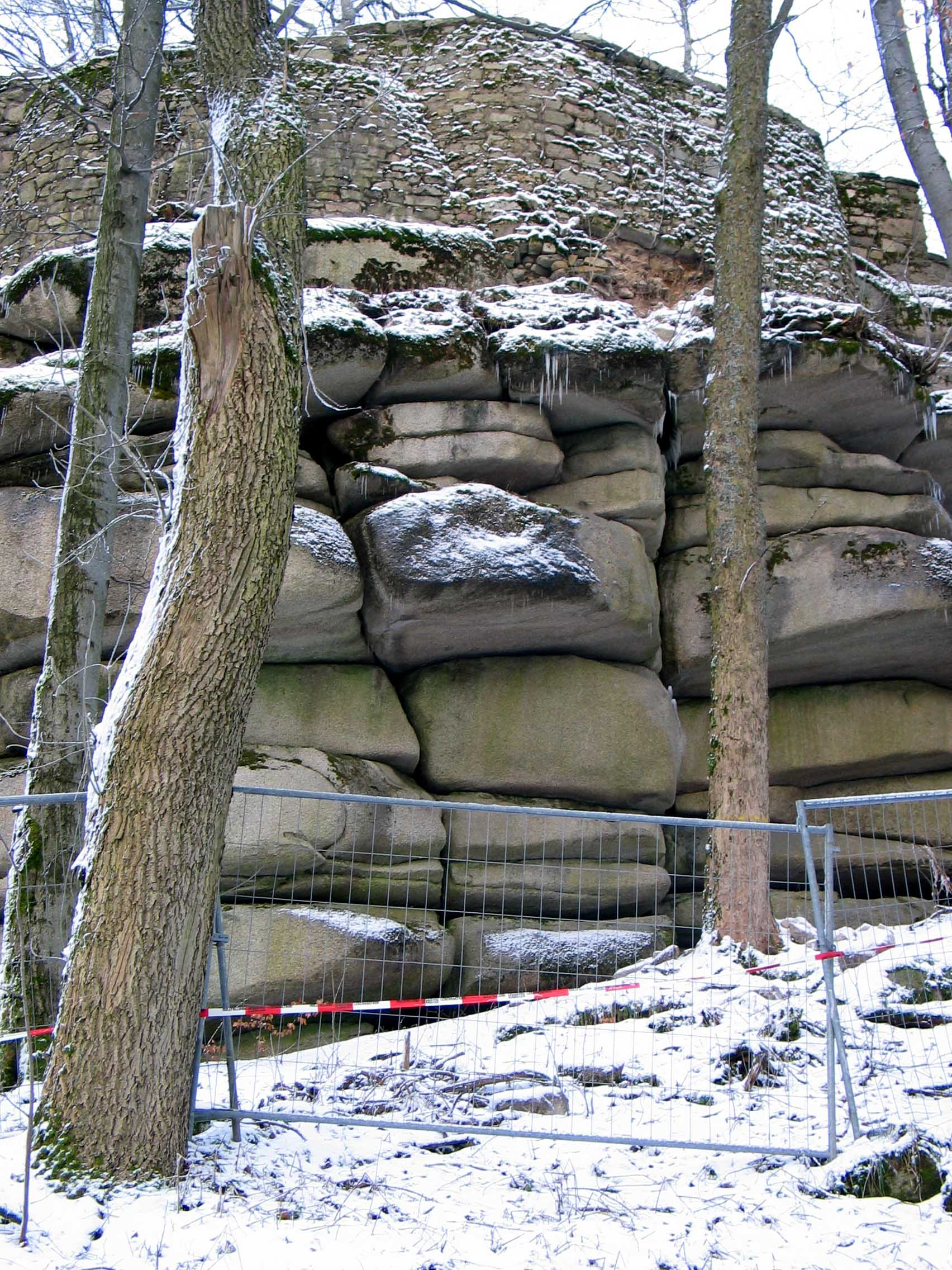
In 2007 parts of the castle wall fell down.

After its destruction in 1523, the castle was forgotten. Not until the War of Spanish Succession (1701–1714), was it used again, this time as a store, the gatehouse being re-roofed and acting as a watchtower. The red tiles used for the roof gave rise to its name of the Red Castle, a term first coined by the headmaster of Hof Grammar School, Helfrecht, in 1795 when he published his first work on the castle.

== The castle today ==
Of the once proud castle rock, only its foundations remain. In 2007, a small part of the wall fell down. The State Department for Monument Conservation is considering whether to save the ruins.

=== Waldstein Festival ===
The Waldstein Festival was staged by the Fichtelgebirge Club at Münchberg for the first time in 1923, 400 years after the destruction of the fortress. In 1995, the Waldstein Rock Theatre Club (Verein Felsenbühne Waldstein) was founded, which currently numbers 150 members and since its founding has performed four historical plays on the stage at the foot of the castle, three of them written themselves.

== Sources ==
- Dietel, Karl (1968). Der Große Waldstein im Fichtelgebirge. Zwischen Waldstein und Döbraberg (in German). Vol. 7. Saalfrank: Helmbrechts. OCLC 631038112.
- Helfrecht, Johann Theodor Benjamin (1795). Ruinen, Alterthümer und noch stehende Schlösser auf und an dem Fichtelgebirge (in German). Grau: Hof. OCLC 15930679.
- Freiherr von Reitzenstein, Karl (1859). Der Schwäbische Bund in Ober-Franken oder des Hauses Sparneck Fall 1523 (in German). Weimar: Kühn. OCLC 712442550.
- Schmalz, Reinhardt (2005). Der Fränkische Krieg 1523 und die Schuld der Sparnecker. Archiv für die Geschichte von Oberfranken (in German). Vol. 85. Historischer Verein für Oberfranken. pp. 151–158.
- Schwarz, Steffen. Die neuere Veste auf dem Waldstein – Eine burgenkundliche Abhandlung (in German).
- Waldsteinfestspiele: Das Vermächtnis (in German).
- Baader, Joseph. Der Fränkische Krieg. Anzeiger für Kunde der deutschen Vorzeit (in German). Vol. 1–3. Staatsarchiv Reitzenstein No.26.
- Baader, Joseph (1873). Verhandlungen über Thomas von Absberg und seine Fehde gegen den Schwäbischen (in German). Vol. 1519 to 1530. Tübingen: Tübingen Literarischer Verein. OCLC 1270984001.
- Vollet, Dr. Hans; Heckel, Kathrin (1987). Die Ruinenzeichnungen des Plassenburgkartographen Johann Christoph Stierlein. Schriften zur Heimatpflege (in German). OCLC 165521962.
