= Franconian War =

1523 war in Franconia, Germany

The Franconian War (German: Fränkische Krieg) was waged in 1523 when the Swabian League attacked several robber baron castles in Franconia, whose nobles were supporters of Hans Thomas of Absberg in the Absberg Feud.

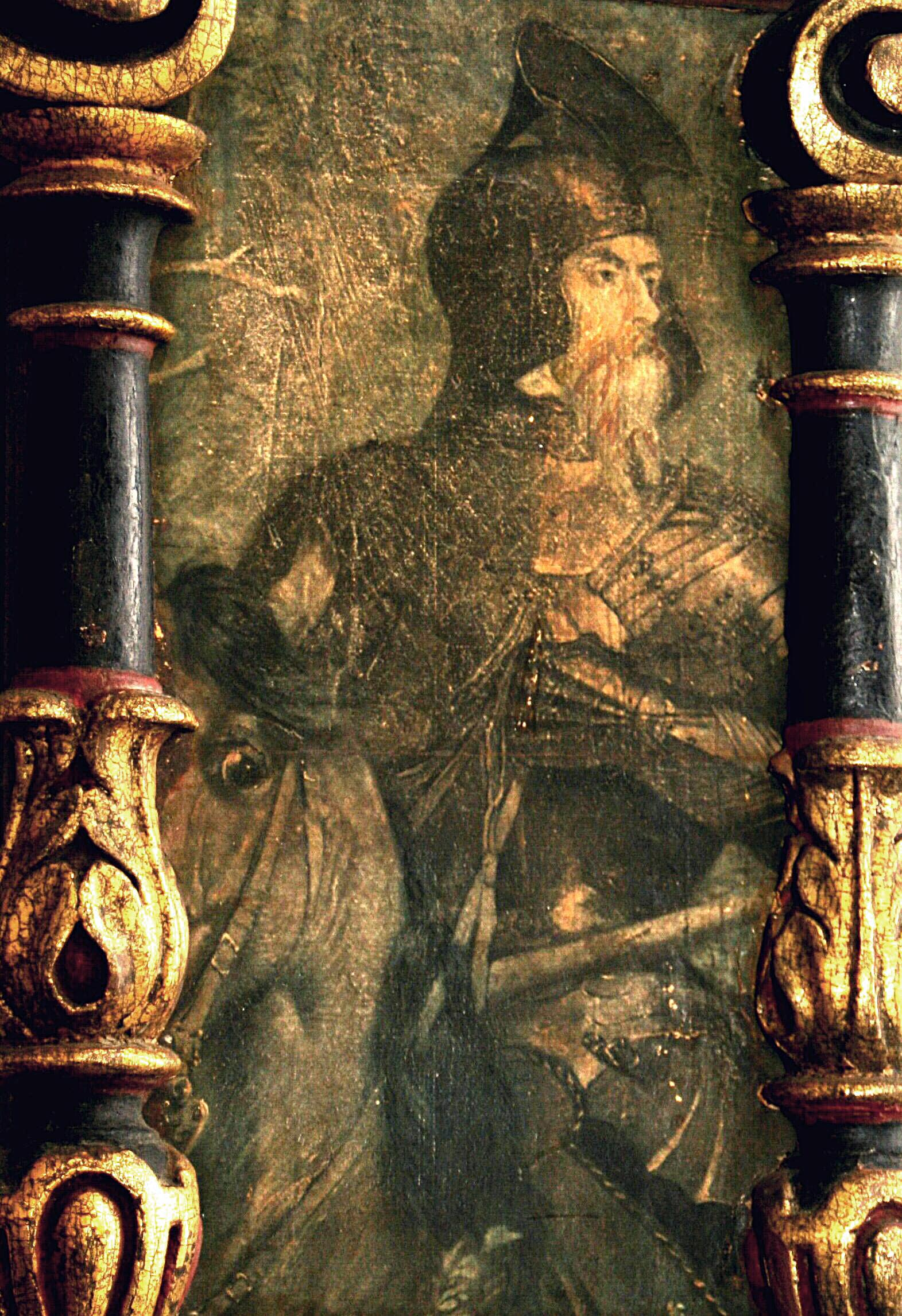
Portrait of Hans Thomas of Absberg in Absberg

== Definitions ==
=== Franconian War ===
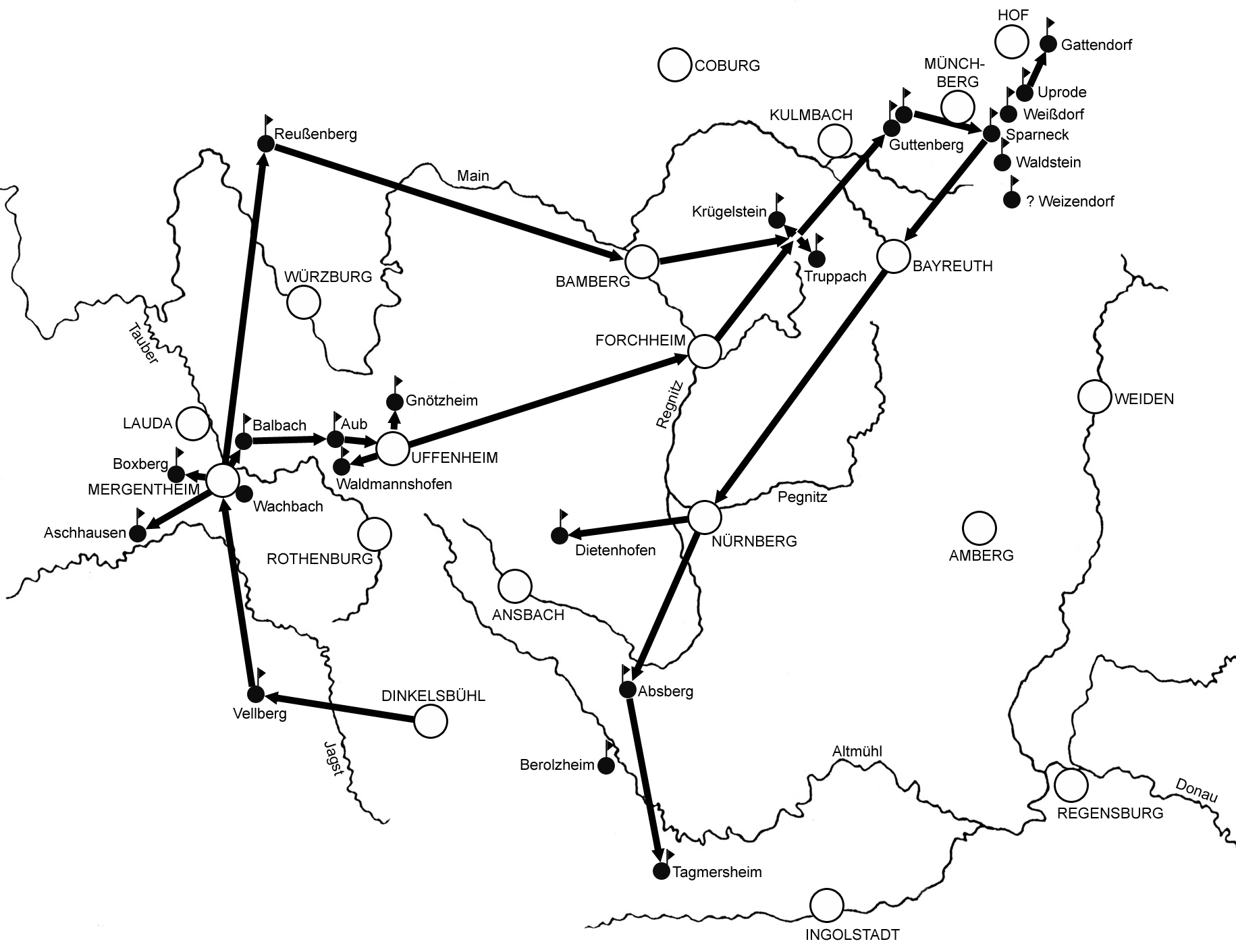
Route of the Swabian League army in the punitive expedition of 1523

By comparison with other wars and battles the Franconian War was limited in extent and restricted to the region of Franconia. In a narrow sense, the term 'Franconian War' refers to the campaign by the Swabian League against 23 castles in June and July 1523. When the term first arose is still unclear, but reports of the conflict from the period immediately after 1523 were already speaking of 'acts of war'. In the 19th century the term was given a note of romance. Today's historians use the term mainly because it conveys the sense that two opponents with conflicting interests were involved in the fighting and the situation was more complex than one might think, if it were simply seen as a retaliation against the robber barons. Around the same time, similar causes also led to the Palatine Knights' War.

=== Absberg Feud ===
Long before the year 1523, Thomas of Absberg had started to kidnap merchants and imperial diplomats from Nuremberg and Augsburg as they travelled. Although these raids often took place in present-day Lower Franconia, he concealed the whereabouts of those he abducted, hiding them in different castles and changing their locations. He had allies far into Bohemian territory, so he could hide his own whereabouts and elude pursuit. He continued his raids even after 1523, but was eventually murdered in 1531 by a follower. The raids of Hans Thomas Absberg during the period 1519-1530 were documented and fought by the Nuremberg War Office (Kriegsstube).

Feuding at that time was a legitimate means of enforcing one's interests. For the Franconian Imperial Knights, whose importance was waning, it was also a means to combat the power of the emerging territorial states, such as the Bishopric of Bamberg and Burgraviate of Nuremberg, as well their margraviates, Kulmbach and Ansbach. However, the robber barons often misused this means of dispute, because a feud had inter alia to be properly announced and needed a reasonable justification. This misuse spelt the end of feuding as a legitimate arm of policy. It was replaced by an even more effective peace under the Landfrieden.

== Course of the war ==
=== Starting position of the Swabian League ===
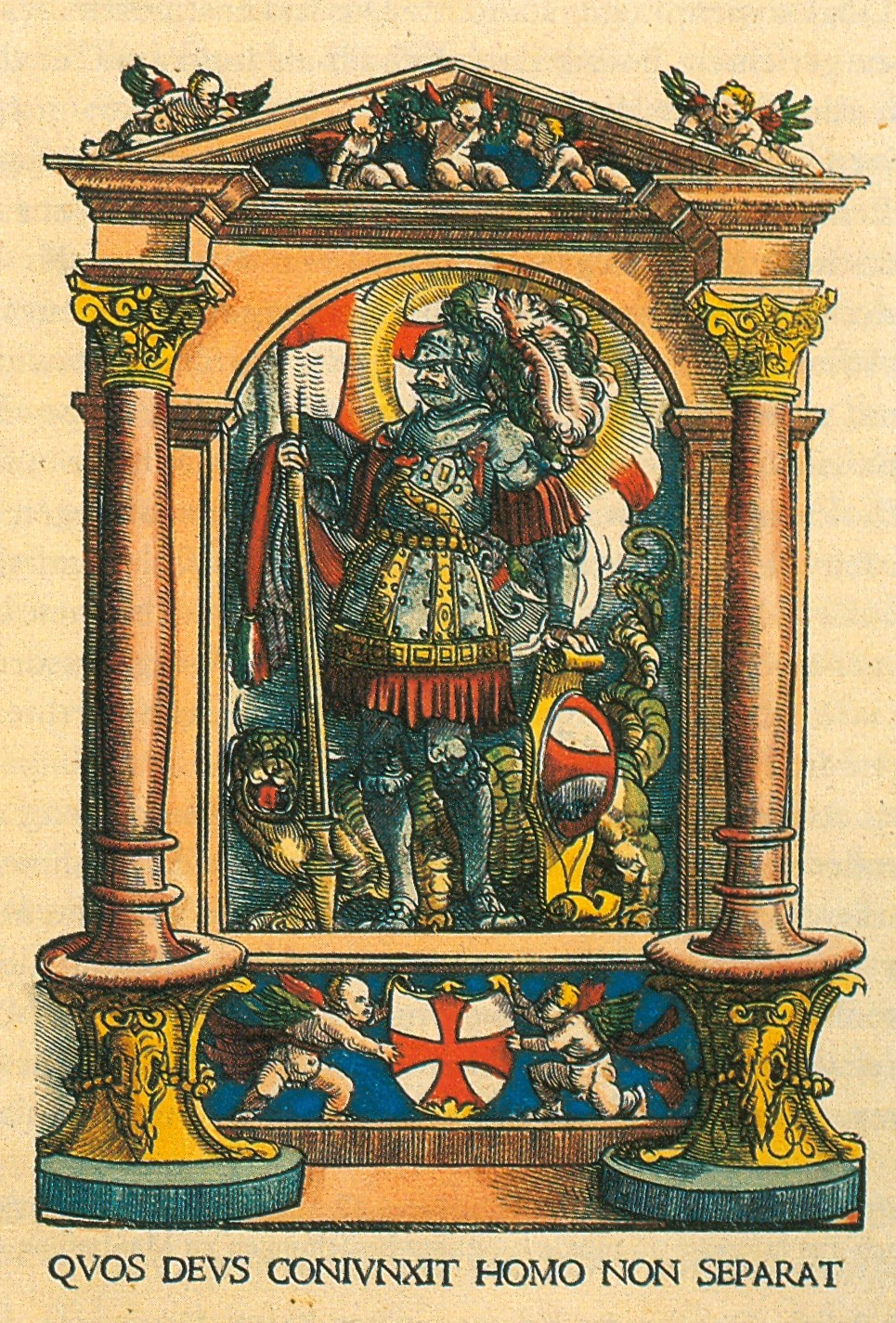
Coat of arms of the Swabian League, 1522

The Swabian League, which can be viewed as a first attempt at a peacekeeping force, was asked for help by the Imperial City of Nuremberg. The alliance had been created in order to assist its members in the preservation of the Landfriede. The Swabian League, which as its name suggests, had its roots in Swabia was made up of Swabian and Franconian Imperial Circles, as well as various Franconian Imperial Cities and territorial lords, for example, the Prince-Bishopric of Würzburg. Under the leadership of Nuremberg, the League began to raise a powerful army comprising contingents of its member states. The list of castles that Nuremberg wanted to have destroyed was long - in negotiations among the members of the League, agreement was finally reached in 1522 on the castles that were then to be attacked.

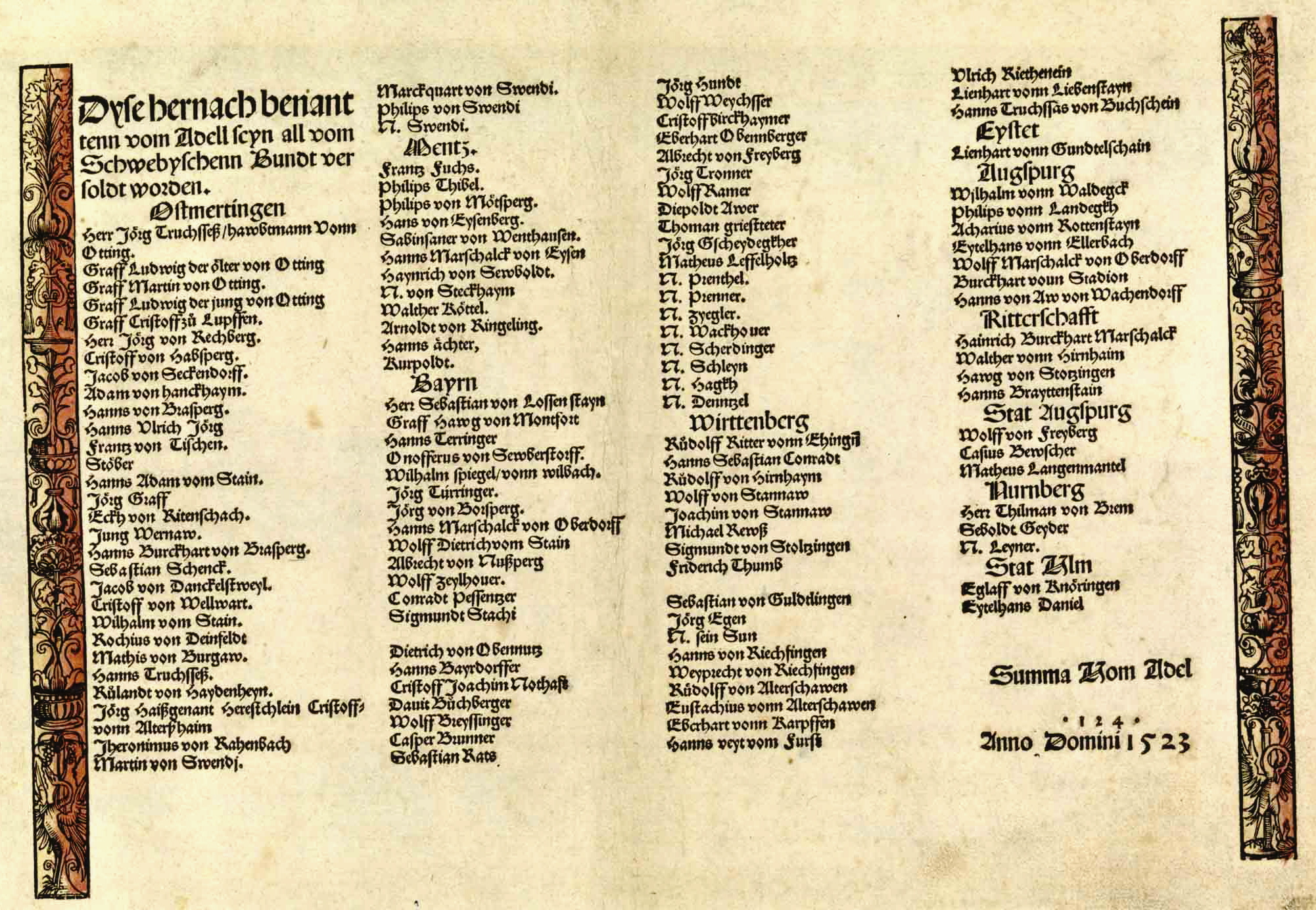
List of people of the salaried nobility from the Bamberg Castle Book

According to Roth von Schreckenstein, members of the Swabian League included the following Bavarian, Franconian and Swabian noble families: Seckendorff, Stain, Reischach, Wellwart, Schwendi, Echter, Torringer, Seibolstorff, Nothaft, Preysing, Nußberg, Hundt, Freiberg, Auer, Löffelholz, Ehingen, Hürnheim, Sotzingen, Thumb, Gültlingen, Rieringen, Ow zu Wachendorf, and Knöringen. In addition they were joined by various counts of Oettingen. An exact contemporary listing is found in the Bamburg Castle Book.

=== Starting position of the robber barons around Hans Thomas Absberg ===
Various factors led to the steady decline of the knighthood, for example, the decline in their importance compared with the territorial states or cities with thriving trade relations and even the loss of their function in raising troops for war. Noble families who had successfully dealt with this structural change usually presented themselves for service to territorial princes or the Emperor and were given important posts such as Hofmeister or Amtmann. Nevertheless, Hans Thomas Absberg had strong backing among the Franconian knights; his closest followers came from prominent families, like the Rosenbergs, Thüngens, Guttenbergs, Wirsbergs, Sparnecks, and Aufseßes. Many of the small estates into which the Franconian region was politically divided benefited from his raids. Besides In addition to imperially free estates, the borders of the bishoprics of Bamberg and Würzburg, Brandenburg-Kulmbach and the road to Bohemia and Saxony all lay close together.

=== Wider political context ===
The Swabian League not only took its duty seriously to provide assistance for the city of Nuremberg as a member of the League, but also had a cause for concern because of a connection between the banned Ulrich of Württemberg and the rebel knight, Franz von Sickingen. Von Sickingen's raids extended as far as Trier and he had strong support in the central German knighthood. Even when Von Sickingen died in May 1523 of his war wounds, the Palatine Knights' War and German Peasants' War erupted a few years later, causing widespread unrest that endangered the growing power of the principalities.

=== Destruction by the Swabian League in 1523 ===
Before the army of the Swabian League marched, the knights who had broken the Landfrieden were given the opportunity to repent and swear an oath of purgation (Reinigungseid). Some of them took the oath and were thus released from further punishment, others were not permitted to take the oath, still others ignored the offer. Woodcarver and "war correspondent" Hans Wandereisen captured the events of 1523 in 23 carvings. At the end of the campaign, some families were able to reconcile with the Swabian League and their estates were restored in return for a sum of gold and the promise that they would respect the peace. Other knights continued their rampaging in the company of Thomas of Absberg, so that, even in 1527, various communities established mounted patrols in order to guard against the raids.

=== Aftermath ===
Horst Carl sees in the events of 1523 a defining moment for Franconia and Swabia. The picture of "Franconian troublemakers and Swabian law enforcers" (fränkischen Unruhestiftern und schwäbischen Ordnungshütern) has had lasting influence on both regions in terms of their self-portrayal and their view of the other region.

== See also ==
- History of Franconia

== Literature ==
=== Modern specialist literature ===
- Horst Carl: Der Schwäbische Bund 1488–1534. Landfrieden und Genossenschaft im Übergang vom Spätmittelalter zur Reformation (= Schriften zur südwestdeutschen Landeskunde. Bd. 24). DRW-Verlag, Leinfelden-Echterdingen, 2000, ISBN 3-87181-424-5, pp. 472–480, (also: Habilitations-Schrift, University of Tübingen, 1998).
- Horst Carl: Fränkische Unruhestifter und schwäbische Ordnungshüter? - Schwäbisches und fränkisches Regionalbewusstsein im Kontext frühneuzeitlicher Politik. In: Thomas Kühne, Cornelia Rauh-Kühne (Hrsg.): Raum und Geschichte. Regionale Traditionen und föderative Ordnungen von der Frühen Neuzeit bis zur Gegenwart (= Schriften zur südwestdeutschen Landeskunde. Bd. 40). DRW-Verlag, Leinfelden-Echterdingen, 2001, ISBN 3-87181-440-7, pp. 24–37.
- Karl Heinz Kalb: Zum Wesen der Kriegsführung am Beginn der Neuzeit. Ihre Auswirkungen am oberen Main (= Amtlicher Schulanzeiger für den Regierungsbezirk Oberfranken. Heimatbeilage. Nr. 58, ZDB-ID 583304-8). Regierung von Oberfranken, Bayreuth, 1977.
- Peter Ritzmann: „Plackerey in teutschen Landen“. Untersuchungen zur Fehdetätigkeit des fränkischen Adels im frühen 16. Jahrhundert und ihrer Bekämpfung durch den Schwäbischen Bund und die Reichsstadt Nürnberg, insbesondere am Beispiel des Hans Thomas von Absberg und seiner Auseinandersetzung mit den Grafen von Oettingen (1520–31). Dissertations-Verlag NG-Kopierladen GmbH., Munich, 1995, ISBN 3-928536-50-8 (also: Dissertation, Ludwig-Maximilians-Universität München, Munich, 1994).
- Reinhardt Schmalz: Der Fränkische Krieg 1523 und die Schuld der Sparnecker. In: Archiv für Geschichte von Oberfranken. Vol. 85, 2005, pp. 151–158.
- Thomas Steinmetz: Conterfei etlicher Kriegshandlungen von 1523 bis in das 1527 Jar – Zu Burgendarstellungen über die "Absberger Fehde" oder den "Fränkischen Krieg". In: Beiträge zur Erforschung des Odenwaldes und seiner Randlandschaften. Vol. 4, 1986, ZDB-ID 553263-2, pp. 365–386.

=== Classical specialist literature ===
- Joseph Baader: Die Fehde des Hans Thomas von Absberg wider den schwäbischen Bund. Ein Beitrag zur Culturgeschichte des sechszehnten Jahrhunderts. Kellerer, Munich, 1880.
- Joseph Baader (ed.): Verhandlungen über Thomas von Absberg und seine Fehde gegen den Schwäbischen Bund 1519 bis 1530 (= Bibliothek des Litterarischen Vereins in Stuttgart. Jg. 27, Publication 1 = Publication 114, ZDB-ID 519450-7). Auf Kosten des Litterarischen Vereins, Tübingen, 1873, digitalised.
- Johann Heilmann: Kriegsgeschichte von Bayern, Franken, Pfalz und Schwaben von 1506 bis 1651. Band 1: Kriegsgeschichte und Kriegswesen von 1506–1598. Literarisch-artistische Anstalt der G. J. Cotta'schen Buchhandlung, Munich, 1868, pp. 29–36.
- Karl Freiherr von Reitzenstein: Der Schwäbische Bund in Ober-Franken oder des Hauses Sparneck Fall 1523. Akten zur fränkischen Geschichte. Kühn, Weimar, 1859, digitalised.
- Karl Heinrich Freiherr Roth von Schreckenstein: Geschichte der ehemaligen freien Reichsritterschaft in Schwaben, Franken und am Rheinstrome, nach Quellen bearbeitet. Band 2: Vom Jahre 1437 bis zur Aufhebung der Reichsritterschaft. Laupp, Tübingen, 1862, pp. 249–253.
