= Sparneck family =

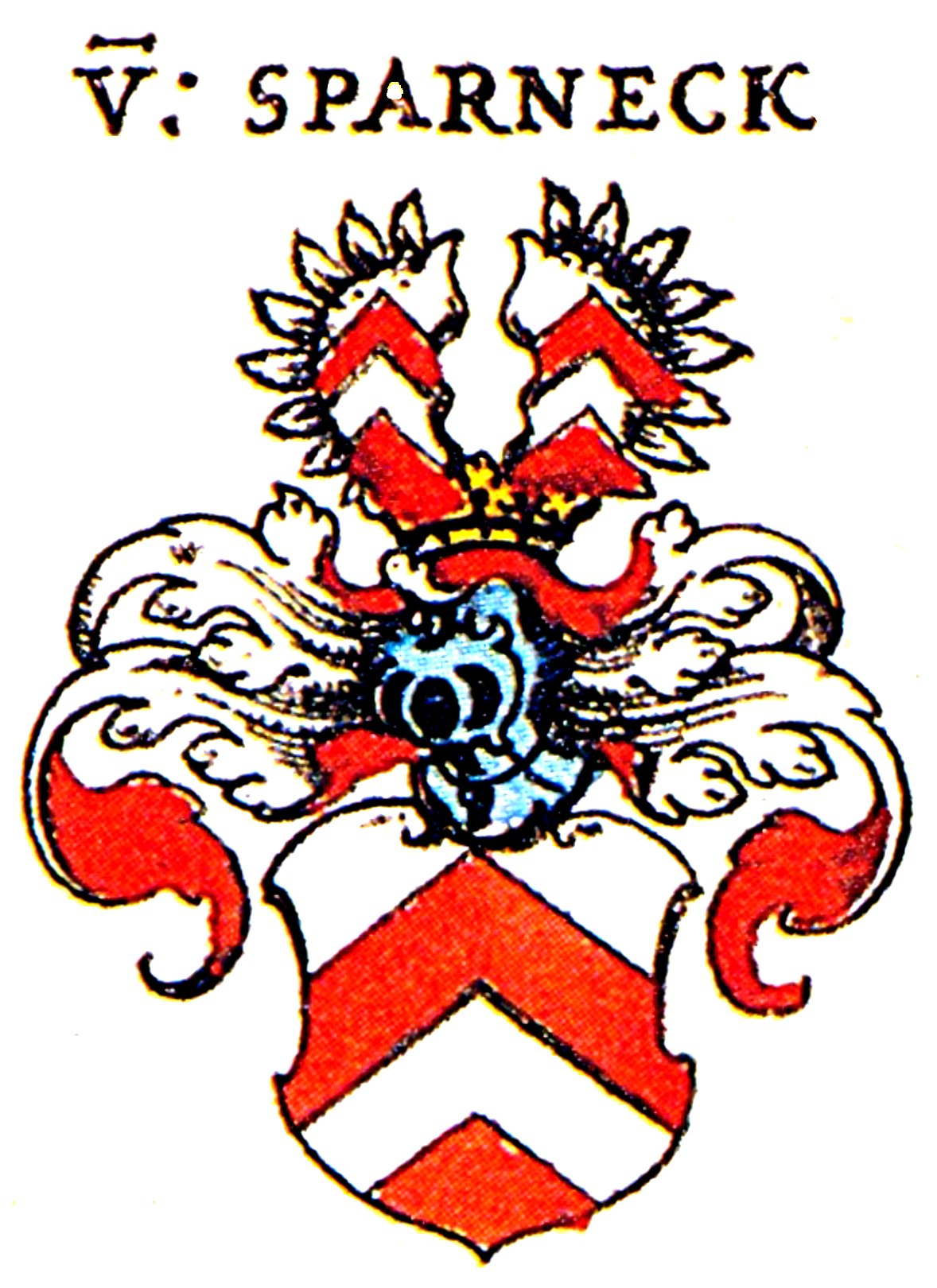
Coat of arms in Siebmachers Wappenbuch

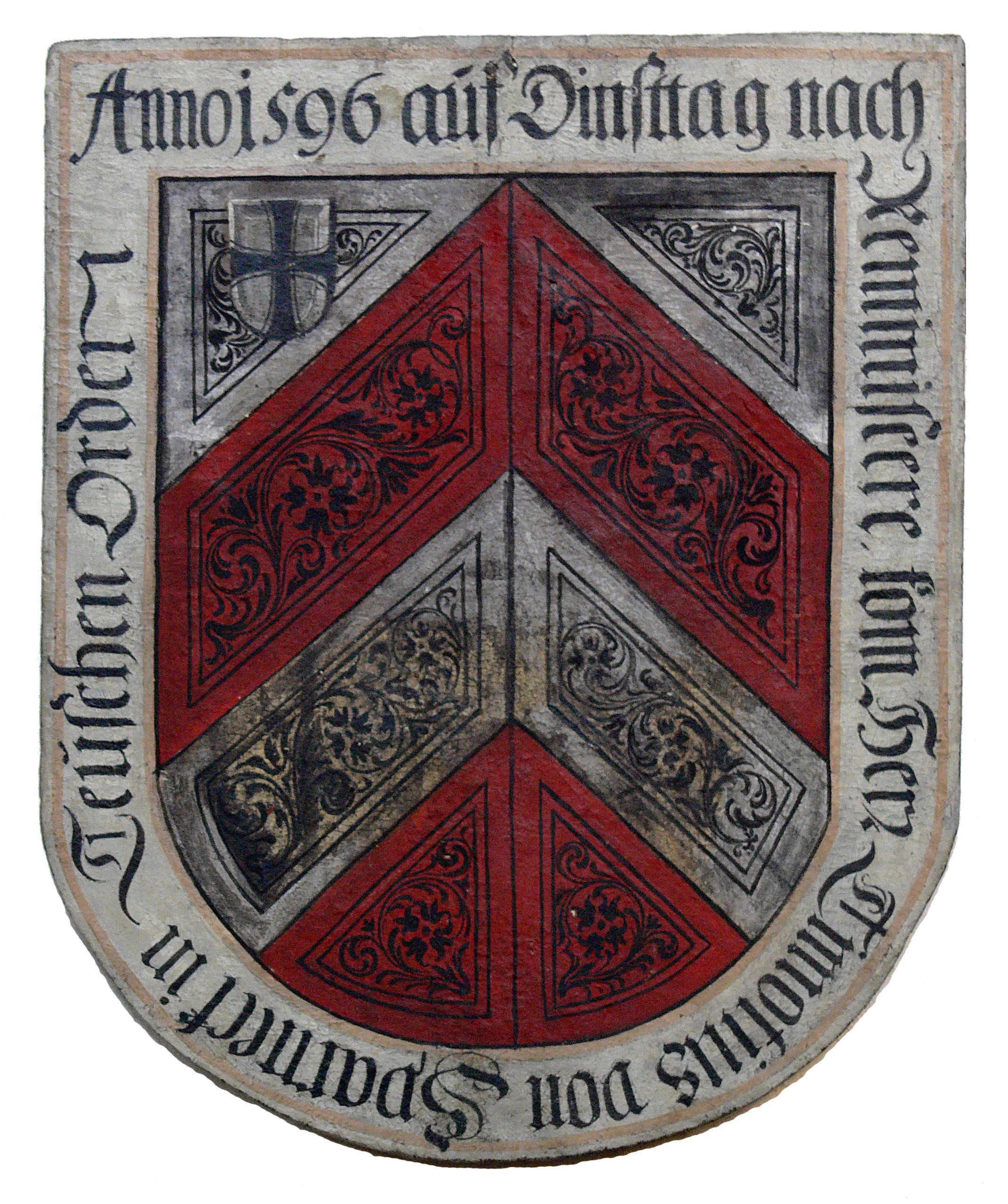
Sparneck as Teutonic Knights

The Sparneck family was an old German noble family from Franconia.

== History ==
The family is known to exist from 1223 to 1744 and was named after the market village of Sparneck. One of their first castles was the Waldsteinburg; further castles were located in Sparneck, Weißdorf, Stockenroth, Uprode near Weißdorf, Stein near Gefrees, Hallerstein (now part of Schwarzenbach an der Saale) and Gattendorf. Their homeland corresponds to the old district of Münchberg, now part of the district of Hof. The family is directly related to the Houses of Bibra, Gravenreuth, Guttenberg, Kotzau, Künsberg, Notthafft, Pappenheim, Reitzenstein and Zedtwitz. As a consequence of supporting the robber baron Thomas von Absberg, they were forced to give up their origin lands and moved to Upper Palatinate, keeping only few fiefs, the so-called Afterlehen, e.g. in Bernstein near Wunsiedel and Dörflas, now a part of Marktredwitz. For two generations they can be found in Libá. At last they owned manor houses in Trausnitz, Püchersreuth and Reuth bei Erbendorf.
