= Swabia =

Cultural, historic, and linguistic region of Germany

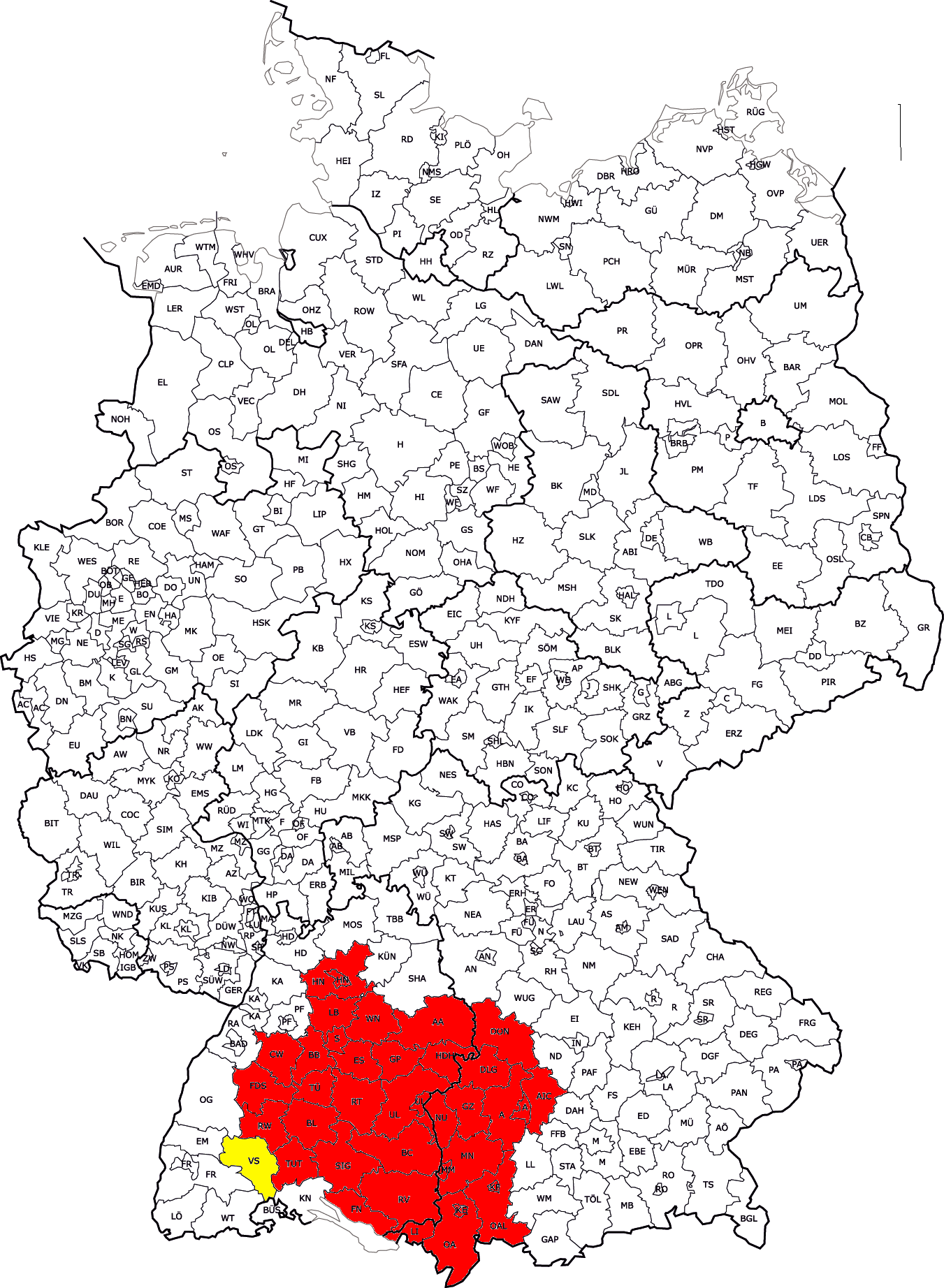
Today's Swabia within Germany. The Schwarzwald-Baar-Kreis (yellow) is at the transitional area of the Swabian, Upper Rhenish and Lake Constance dialects of Alemannic. The western Bodenseekreis district is not considered a part of modern Swabia. The dividing line is between Baden-Württemberg (west) and Bavaria (east).

The coat of arms of Baden-Württemberg: Or, three lions passant sable, the arms of the Duchy of Swabia, in origin the arms of the House of Hohenstaufen. Also used for Swabia (and Württemberg-Baden, 1945–1952) are the three antlers of the coat of arms of Württemberg.

Swabia (Note: /ˈsweɪ.bi.ə/ SWAY-bee-ə; German: Schwaben [ˈʃvaːbn̩]; colloquially Schwabenland or Ländle; archaic English also Suabia or Svebia) is a cultural, historical and linguistic region in southwestern Germany. The name is ultimately derived from the medieval Duchy of Swabia, one of the German stem duchies, representing the historic settlement area of the Germanic tribe alliances named Alemanni and Suebi.

This territory would include all of the Alemannic German area, but the modern concept of Swabia is more restricted, due to the collapse of the duchy of Swabia in the thirteenth century. Swabia as understood in modern ethnography roughly coincides with the Swabian Circle of the Holy Roman Empire as it stood during the early modern period, now divided between the states of Bavaria and Baden-Württemberg.

Swabians (Schwaben, singular Schwabe) are the natives of Swabia and speakers of Swabian German. Their number was estimated at close to 800,000 by SIL Ethnologue as of 2006, out of a total population of 7.5 million in the regions of Tübingen, Stuttgart and Bavarian Swabia.

== History ==
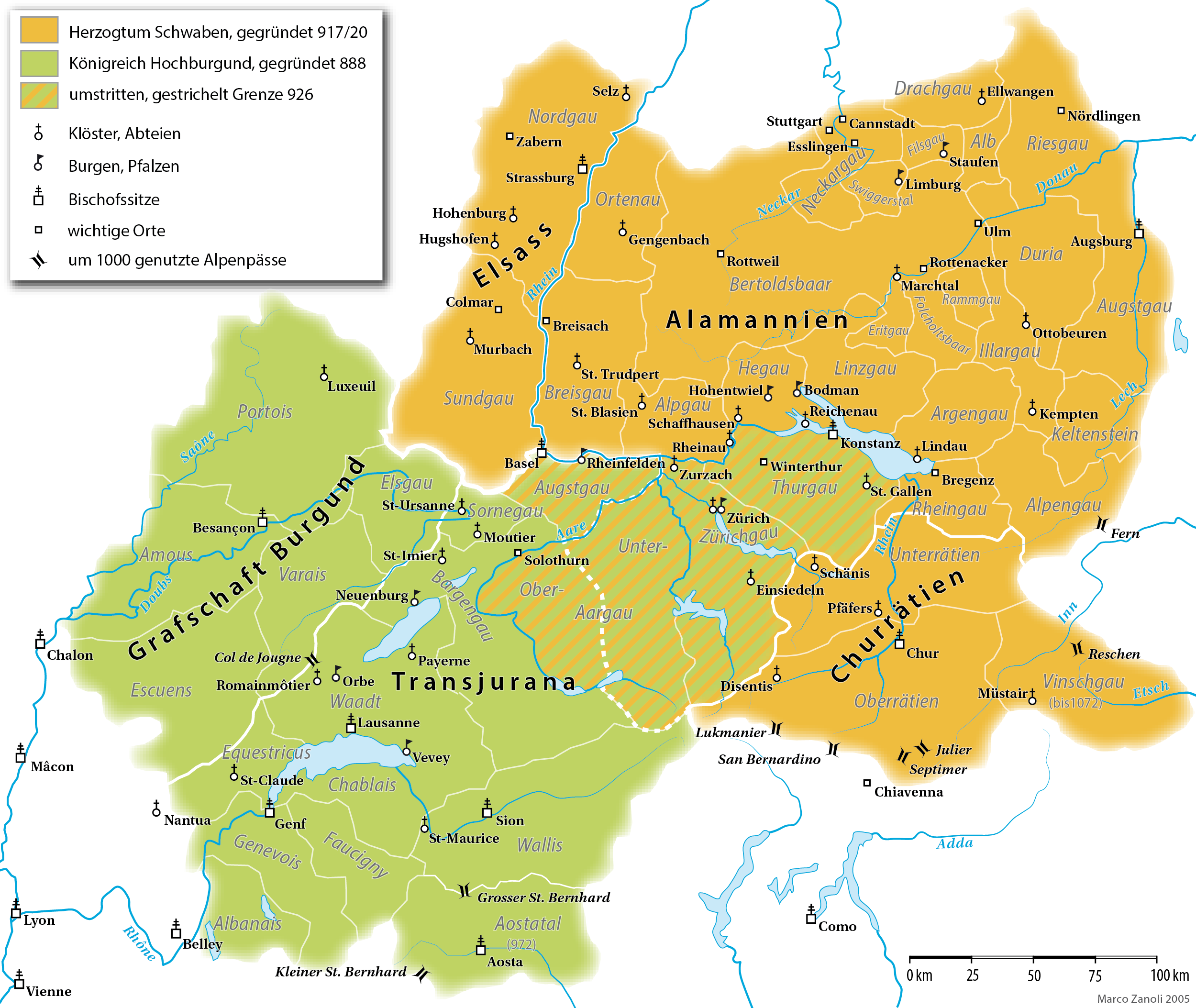
Duchy of Swabia around AD 1000 shown in gold yellow including (present-day) Alsace, the southern part of Baden-Württemberg, Bavarian Swabia, Vorarlberg in Austria, Liechtenstein, eastern Switzerland and small parts of northern Italy. In green: Upper Burgundy.

=== Early history ===
Like all of Southern Germany, what is now Swabia was part of the La Tène culture; as such, it has a Celtic (Gaulish) substrate. In the Roman era, it was part of the Raetia province.

The name Suebia is derived from that of the Suebi. It is used already by Tacitus in the 1st century, albeit in a different geographical sense: He calls the Baltic Sea the Mare Suevicum ("Suebian Sea") after the Suiones, and ends his description of the Suiones and Sitones with "Here Suebia ends" (Hic Suebiae finis). By the mid-3rd century, groups of the Suebi form the core element of the new tribal alliance known as the Alamanni, who expanded towards the Roman Limes east of the Rhine and south of the Main. The Alamanni were sometimes referred to as Suebi even at this time, and their new area of settlement came to be known as Suebia. In the migration period, the Suebi (Alamanni) crossed the Rhine in 406 and some of them established the Kingdom of the Suebi in Galicia. Another group settled in parts of Pannonia, after the Huns were defeated in 454 in the Battle of Nedao.

The Alemanni were ruled by independent kings throughout the 4th to 5th centuries but fell under Frankish domination in the 6th (Battle of Tolbiac 496). By the late 5th century, the area settled by the Alemanni extended to Alsace and the Swiss Plateau, bordering on the Bavarii to the east, the Franks to the north, the remnants of Roman Gaul to the west, and the Lombards and Goths, united in the Kingdom of Odoacer, to the south.

The name Alamannia was used by the 8th century, and from the 9th century, Suebia was occasionally used for Alamannia, while Alamannia was increasingly used to refer to Alsace specifically. By the 12th century, Suebia rather than Alamannia was used consistently for the territory of the Duchy of Swabia.

=== Duchy of Swabia ===
Swabia was one of the original stem duchies of East Francia, the later Holy Roman Empire, as it developed in the 9th and 10th centuries. Due to the foundation of the important abbeys of St. Gallen and Reichenau, Swabia became an important center of Old High German literary culture during this period.

In the later Carolingian period, Swabia became once again de facto independent, by the early 10th century mostly ruled by two dynasties, the Hunfriding counts in Raetia Curiensis and the Ahalolfings ruling the Baar estates around the upper Neckar and Danube rivers. The conflict between the two dynasties was decided in favour of Hunfriding Burchard II at the Battle of Winterthur (919). Burchard's rule as duke was acknowledged as such by the newly elected king Henry the Fowler, and in the 960s the duchy under Burchard III was incorporated in the Holy Roman Empire under Otto I.

The Hohenstaufen dynasty, which ruled the Holy Roman Empire in the 12th and 13th centuries, arose out of Swabia, but following the execution of Conradin, the last Hohenstaufen, on 29 October 1268, the duchy was not reappointed during the Great Interregnum. In the following years, the original duchy gradually broke up into many smaller units.

Rudolf I of Habsburg, elected in 1273 as emperor, tried to restore the duchy, but met the opposition of the higher nobility who aimed to limit the power of the emperor. Instead, he confiscated the former estates of the Hohenstaufen as imperial property of the Holy Roman Empire, and declared most of the cities formerly belonging to Hohenstaufen to be Free Imperial Cities, and the more powerful abbeys within the former duchy to be Imperial Abbeys.

The rural regions were merged into the Imperial Shrievalty (Reichslandvogtei) of Swabia, which was given as Imperial Pawn to Duke Leopold III of Austria in 1379 and again to Sigismund, Archduke of Austria, in 1473/1486. He took the title of a "Prince of Swabia" and integrated the Shrievalty of Swabia in the realm of Further Austria.

=== Later medieval period ===
The Swabian League of Cities was first formed on 20 November 1331, when twenty-two imperial cities of the former Duchy of Swabia banded together in support of the Emperor Louis IV, who in return promised not to mortgage any of them to any imperial vassal. Among the founding cities were Augsburg, Heilbronn, Reutlingen, and Ulm. The counts of Württemberg, Oettingen, and Hohenberg were induced to join in 1340.

The defeat of the city league by Count Eberhard II of Württemberg in 1372 led to the formation of a new league of fourteen Swabian cities on 4 July 1376. The emperor refused to recognise the newly revitalised Swabian League, seeing it as a rebellion, and this led to an "imperial war" against the league. The renewed league defeated an imperial army at the Battle of Reutlingen on 14 May 1377. Burgrave Frederick V of Hohenzollern finally defeated the league in 1388 at Döffingen. The next year the city league disbanded according to the resolutions of the Reichstag at Eger.

The major dynasties that arose out of medieval Swabia were the Habsburgs and the Hohenzollerns, who rose to prominence in Northern Germany. Also stemming from Swabia are the local dynasties of the dukes of Württemberg and the margraves of Baden. The Welf family went on to rule in Bavaria and Hanover, and are ancestral to the British royal family that has ruled since 1714. Smaller feudal dynasties eventually disappeared, however; for example, branches of the Montforts and Hohenems lived until modern times, and the Fürstenberg survive still. The region proved to be one of the most divided in the empire, containing, in addition to these principalities, numerous free cities, ecclesiastical territories, and fiefdoms of lesser counts and knights.

=== Early modern history ===
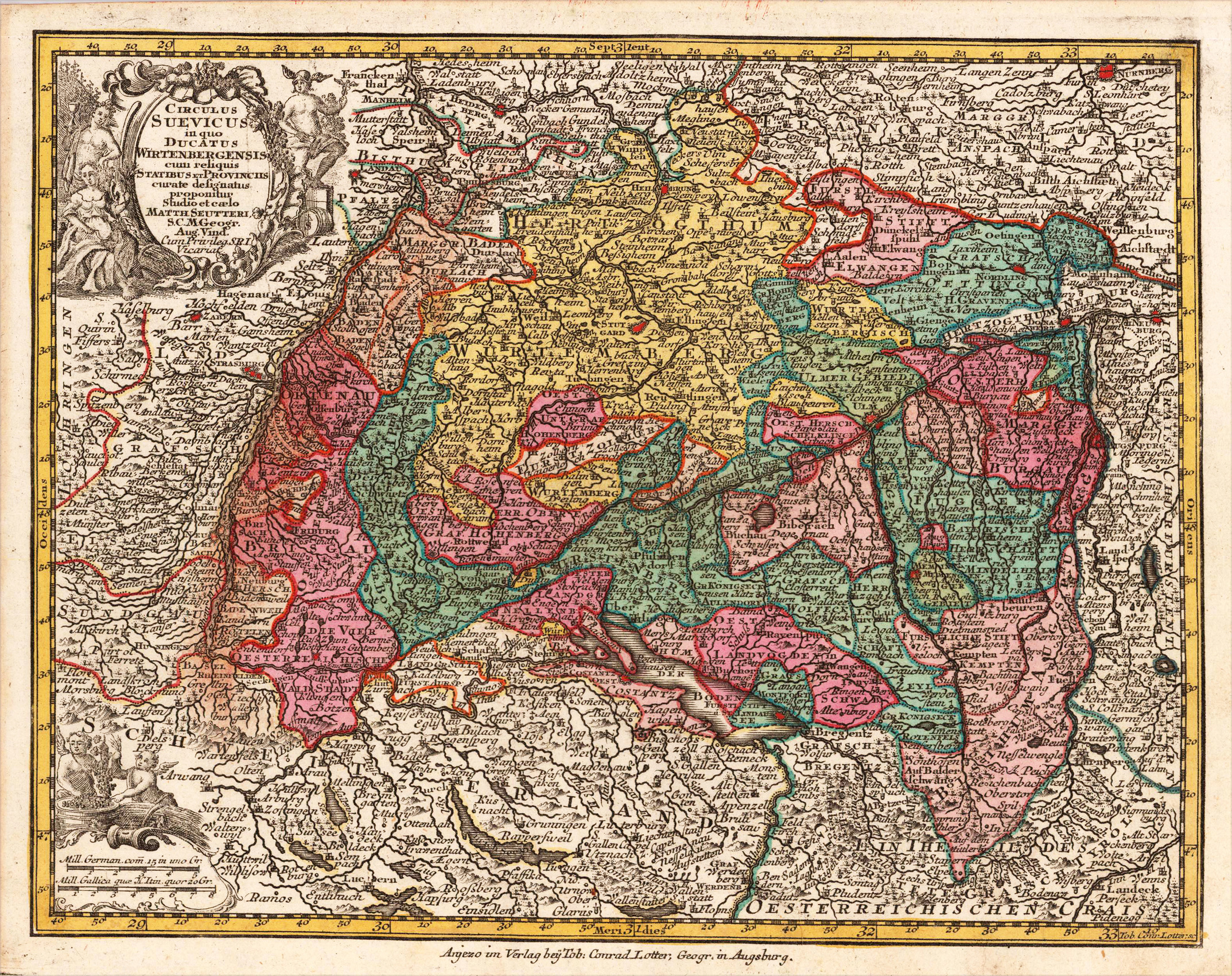
Map of the Swabian Circle (1756)

A new Swabian League (Schwäbischer Bund) was formed in 1488, opposing the expansionist Bavarian dukes from the House of Wittelsbach and the revolutionary threat from the south in the form of the Swiss. In 1519, the League conquered Württemberg and sold it to Charles V after its duke Ulrich seized the Free Imperial City of Reutlingen during the interregnum that followed the death of Maximilian I. It helped to suppress the Peasants' Revolt in 1524–26 and defeat an alliance of robber barons in the Franconian War. The Reformation caused the league to be disbanded in 1534.

The territory of Swabia as understood today emerges in the early modern period. It corresponds to the Swabian Circle established in 1512. The Old Swiss Confederacy was de facto independent from Swabia from 1499 as a result of the Swabian War, while the Margraviate of Baden had been detached from Swabia since the twelfth century.

Fearing the power of the greater princes, the cities and smaller secular rulers of Swabia joined to form the Swabian League in the fifteenth century. The League was quite successful, notably expelling the Duke of Württemberg in 1519 and putting in his place a Habsburg governor, but the league broke up a few years later over religious differences inspired by the Reformation, and the Duke of Württemberg was soon restored.

The region was quite divided by the Reformation. While secular princes such as the Duke of Württemberg and the Margrave of Baden-Durlach, as well as most of the Free Cities, became Protestant, the ecclesiastical territories (including the bishoprics of Augsburg, Konstanz and the numerous Imperial abbeys) remained Catholic, as did the territories belonging to the Habsburgs (Further Austria), the Sigmaringen branch of the House of Hohenzollern, and the Margrave of Baden-Baden.

=== Modern history ===
In the wake of the territorial reorganization of the empire of 1803 by the Reichsdeputationshauptschluss, the shape of Swabia was entirely changed. All the ecclesiastical estates were secularized, and most of the smaller secular states, and almost all of the free cities, were mediatized, leaving only the Kingdom of Württemberg, the Grand Duchy of Baden, and the Principality of Hohenzollern-Sigmaringen as sovereign states. Much of Eastern Swabia became part of Bavaria, forming what is now the Swabian administrative region of Bavaria. The Kings of Bavaria assumed the title Duke in Swabia, with the in indicating that only parts of the Swabian territory was ruled by them, unlike their other title Duke of Franconia which made clear that the whole of Franconia had become part of their kingdom.

In contemporary usage, Schwaben is sometimes taken to refer to Bavarian Swabia exclusively, correctly however it includes the larger Württemberg part of Swabia. Its inhabitants attach great importance to calling themselves Swabians. Baden, historically part of the duchy of Swabia and also of the Swabian Circle, is no longer commonly included in the term. Baden's residents mostly refer to themselves as Alemanni (versus the Swabians).

== Geography ==
Like many cultural regions of Europe, Swabia's borders are not clearly defined. However, today it is normally thought of as comprising the former Swabian Circle, or equivalently the former state of Württemberg (with the Prussian Hohenzollern Province), or the modern districts of Tübingen (excluding the former Baden regions of the Bodenseekreis district), Stuttgart, and the administrative region of Bavarian Swabia.

In the Middle Ages, the term Swabia indicated a larger area, covering all the lands associated with the Frankish stem duchy of Alamannia stretching from the Vosges Mountains in the west to the broad Lech river in the east. This also included the region of Alsace and the later Margraviate of Baden on both sides of the Upper Rhine Valley, as well as modern German-speaking Switzerland, the Austrian state of Vorarlberg and the principality of Liechtenstein in the south.

== Swabian people ==
=== Language ===
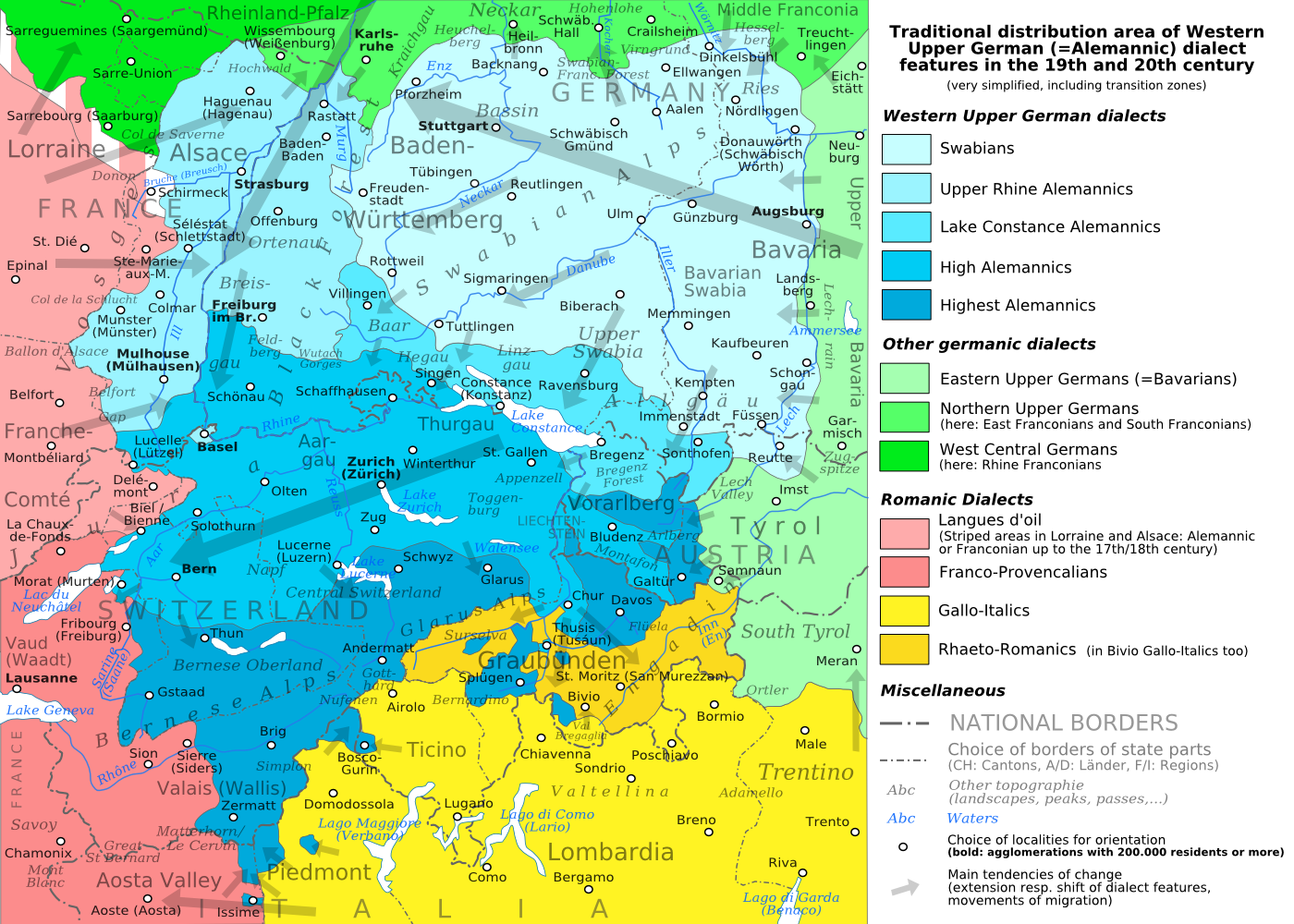
The traditional distribution area of Western Upper German ( = Alemannic) dialect features in the nineteenth and twentieth century

SIL Ethnologue cites an estimate of 819,000 Swabian speakers as of 2006. This corresponds to roughly 10% of the total population of the Swabian region, or roughly 1% of the total population of Germany.

As an ethno-linguistic group, Swabians are closely related to other speakers of Alemannic German, i.e. Badeners, Alsatians, and German-speaking Swiss.

Swabian German is traditionally spoken in the upper Neckar basin (upstream of Heilbronn), along the upper Danube between Tuttlingen and Donauwörth, in Upper Swabia, and on the left bank of the Lech, in an area centered on the Swabian Alps roughly stretching from Stuttgart to Augsburg.

Many Swabian surnames end with the suffixes -le, -(l)er, -el, -ehl, and -lin, typically from the Middle High German diminutive suffix -elîn (Modern Standard German -lein). Examples would be: Schäuble, Egeler, Rommel, and Gmelin. The popular German surname Schwab as well as Svevo in Italy are derived from this area, both meaning literally "Swabian".

== See also ==
- Danube Swabians (Donauschwaben):
  - Banat Swabians
  - Germans of Hungary
  - Germans of Romania
  - Germans of Serbia
  - Satu Mare Swabians
  - Swabian Turkey
- Duke of Swabia
- New Swabia
- Schwaben Redoubt (World War I)
- Swabian children
- Swabian cuisine
- Swabian League
- Schwabenhass ("Suabophobia")

== Sources ==
- Laffan, R. G. D. (1975). "The Empire under Maximilian I". The New Cambridge Modern History. Vol. I.
- Minahan, James (2000). One Europe, Many Nations: A Historical Dictionary of European National Groups. Greenwood Publishing Group, Ltd. ISBN 978-0313309847.
