= Mechlenreuth =

Coordinates: 50°10′17″N 11°48′05″E

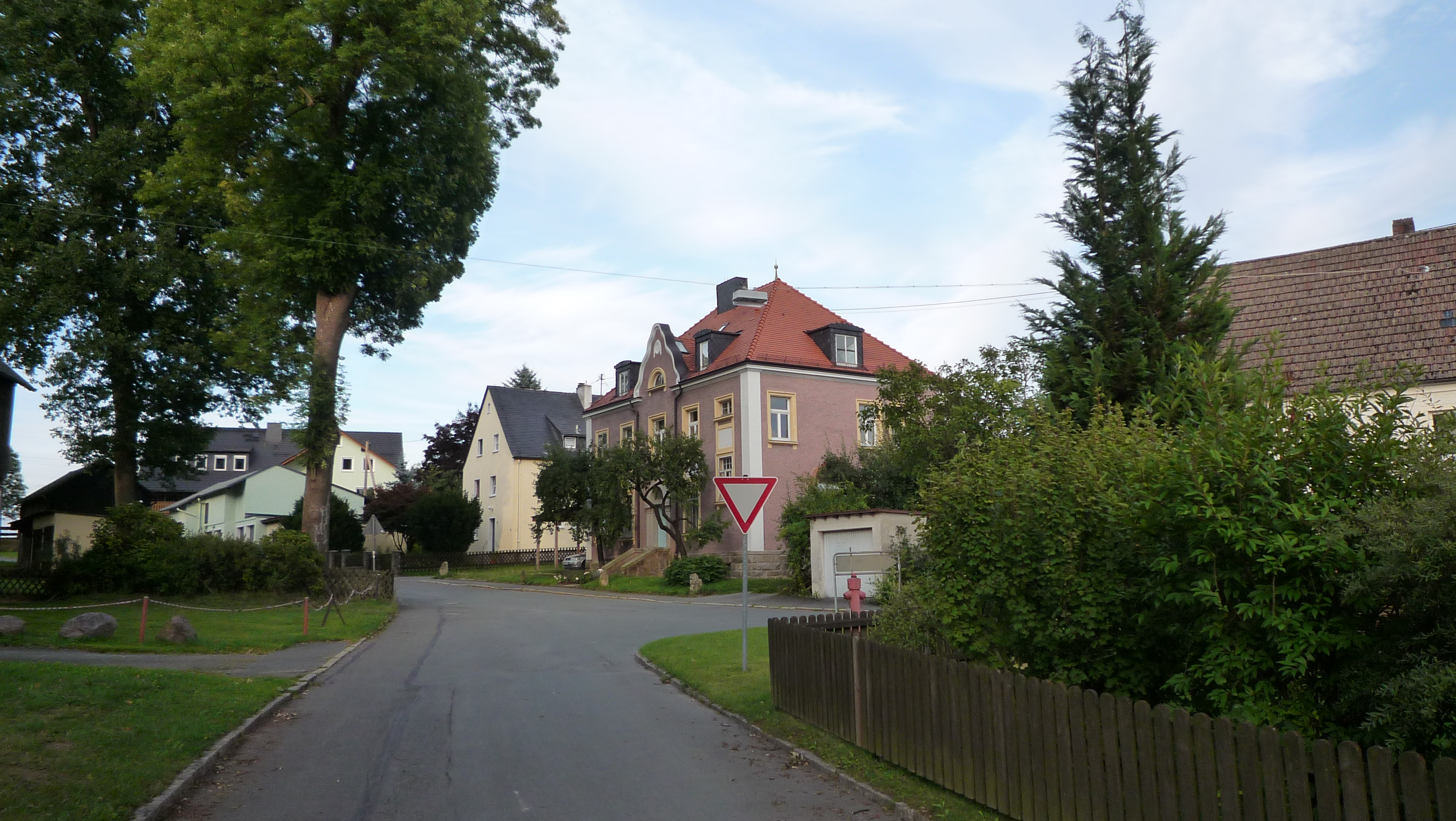
old school and municipal office of Mechlenreuth

Mechlenreuth is a village in Upper Franconia in the district of Hof in Bavaria, Germany. In 1978 the village was incorporated into the city Münchberg. It is assumed that Mechlenreuth originally was a resting place of monks or east striving colonizers. The earliest known mention of the village was in 1185. From 1837 to 1978 Mechlenreuth was an independent municipality. Today it is a village of 200 inhabitants and a part of the city Münchberg.

== Geography ==
The village is located on the edge of the Fichtel Mountain Nature Park. Their neighbouring villages are (clockwise) Münchberg Weißdorf Stockenroth- Germersreuth, Großlosnitz, Kleinlosnitz and Mussen. The village is situated at a height of 545 meters two kilometers south of the city Münchberg. In the south and east is Mechlenreuth in large parts surrounded by forests. In the north-west rises the chapel mountain, the highest point of the village area. It is also a natural border, to the rest of the city Münchberg. The center of the village grouped around a village pond surrounded by trees. Today the village Mechlenreuth also includes the single buildings Upper Eiben, Lower Eiben, Umspannwerk Mechlenreuth, Rußhut, Lohbrickworks and Dietelsmill.

== Literature ==
- Karl Dietel: Münchberg. Story of an official and industrial city, Volume. 1., Until the transition to Bayern 1810. City Administration Münchberg, Münchberg 1963.
- Karl Dietel: Between Waldstein and Döbraberg - The historical development of the council Münchberg. Former district school, Münchberg 1964.
