= House of Absberg =

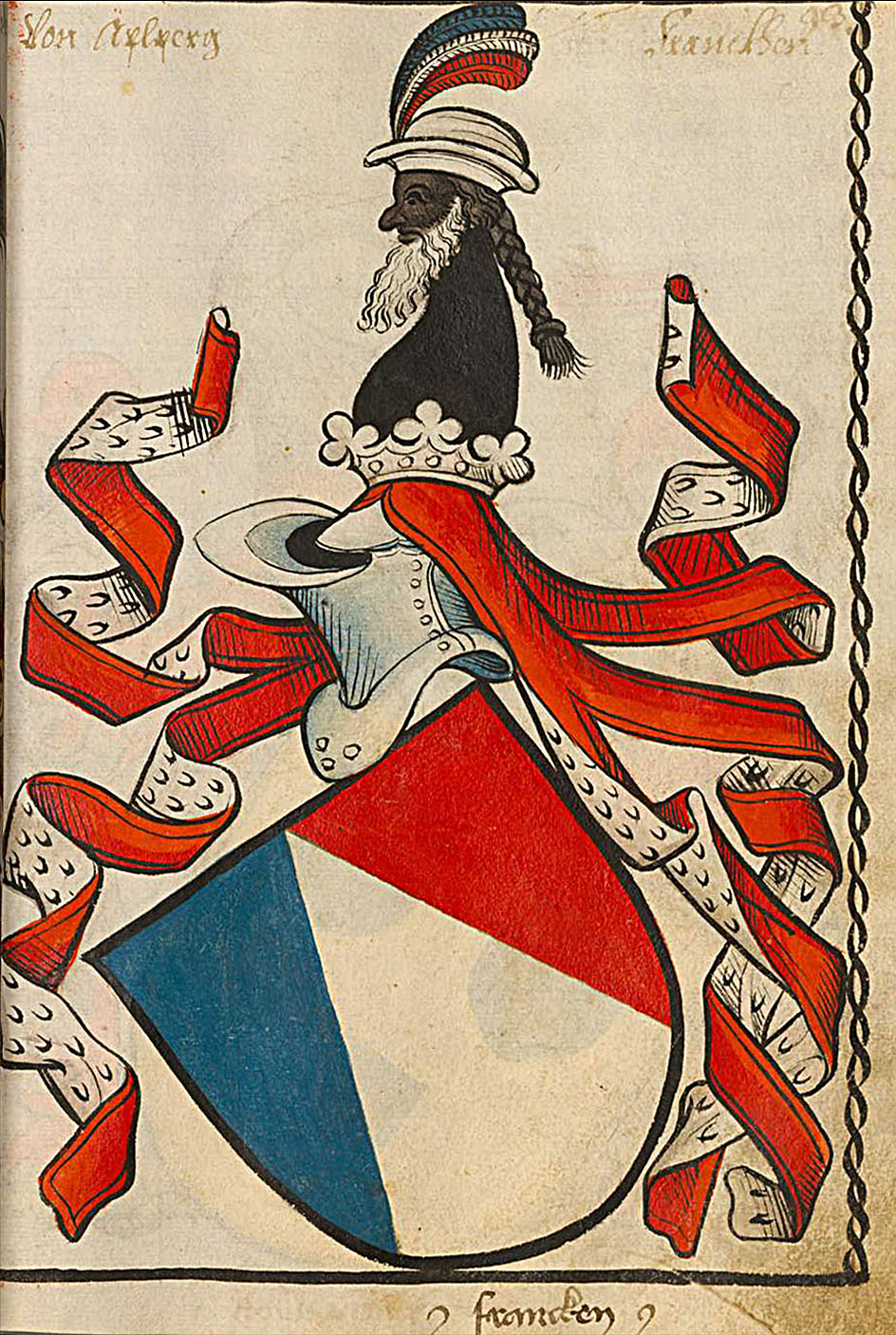
Coat of arms of the Absberg family, Scheiblersches Wappenbuch

The Absberg family was an old, minor German noble family in Franconia.

== History ==
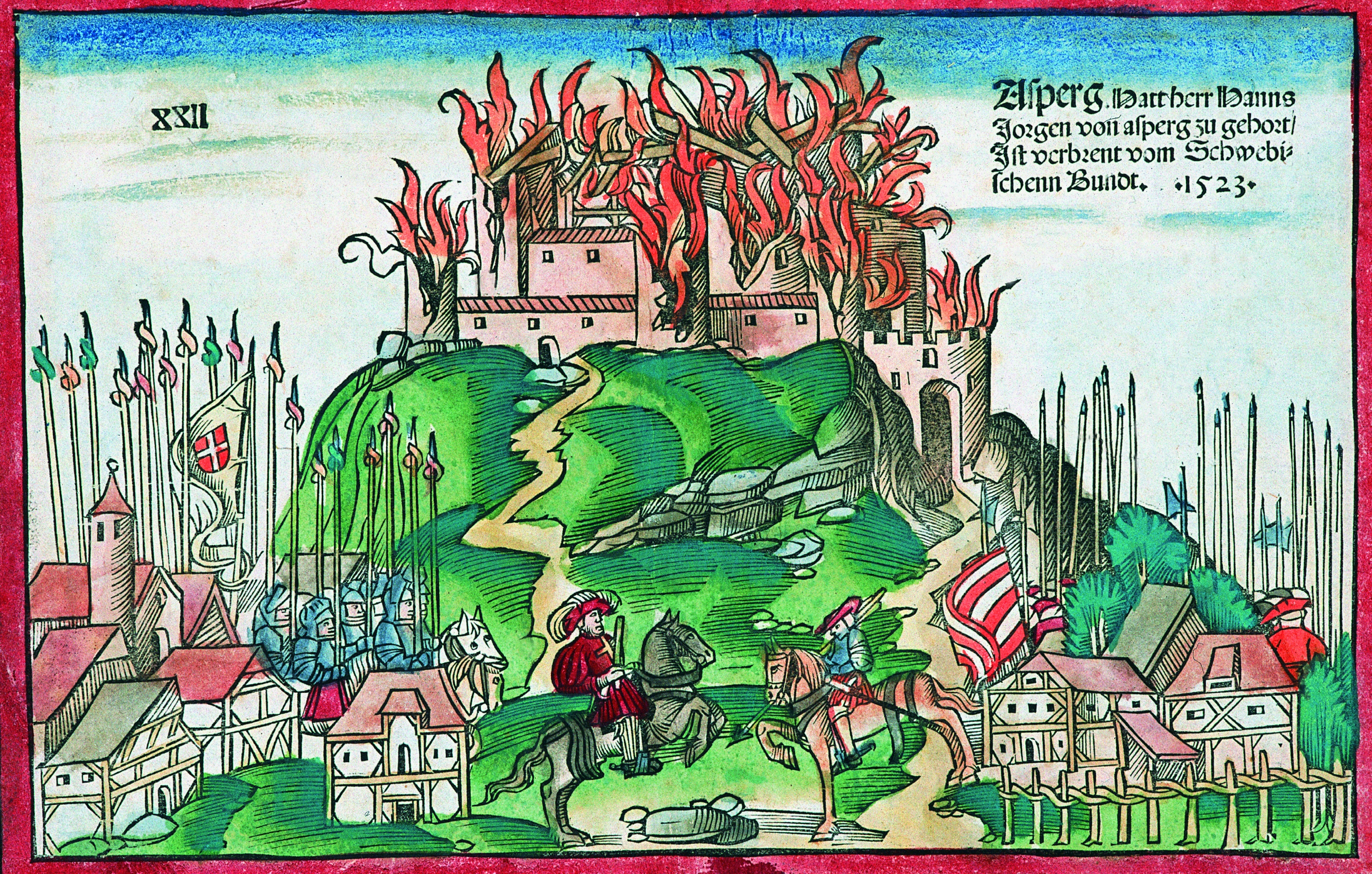
Destruction of the home castle 1523, woodcut of Hans Wandereisen

The family received its name from the village of Absberg, today located in the district Weißenburg-Gunzenhausen in Middle Franconia. Famous members of the family were Henry IV of Absberg, Bishop of Regensburg, and Thomas von Absberg, a robber baron who kidnapped important travellers such as royal legates or merchants from Nuremberg or Augsburg. To punish the behaviour of Thomas of Absberg the Swabian League destroyed the family's castle seat in 1523. This was documented in a woodcut by Hans Wandereisen. The family died out in 1647.
