= Thomas von Absberg =

Hans Thomas von Absberg (1477 – 3 July 1531) was a knight of the Absberg family, known as a robber baron. He lived in the Holy Roman Empire

He kidnapped important travellers like royal legates or merchants from Nuremberg or Augsburg. He was supported by several Frankish knights, who helped to hide the hostages, e.g. members of the houses of Sparneck or the Guttenberg. The hostages were taken on a route with several castles far away from the point they were kidnapped. An advantage for Thomas von Absberg were the nearby borders of several principalities and sometimes he escaped to Bohemia. He was known for the cruelty of cutting off the right hand with a dussack and sending it to the family of his victims to underline his demands for ransom. During the 1522 Diet of Nuremberg von Absberg sent Emperor Charles V severed hands to spite him.

Eventually prisoners held at the Waldsteinburg were able to escape and reveal who the supporters of Thomas von Absberg were and where their castles were. To punish the behaviour of Thomas von Absberg the Swabian League destroyed the family's castle seat in 1523, as well as all of the castles belonging to the House of Sparneck. This was documented in a series of woodcuts by Hans Wandereisen. But Thomas von Absberg was not caught and continued his robbery, until he was murdered in Alten-Sedlitz in 1531 by one of his accomplices.
