= FC Eintracht Münchberg =

German association football club

FC Eintracht Münchberg is an association football club based in Münchberg, Germany. As of the 2025–2026 season, the club currently plays in the Landesliga Nordost. A secondary team and a third team also exist, with the second team playing in the Kreisliga (Step 8), and the third team plays in the Klasse-A (Step 10).

== History ==
The club was founded in 2000 after FC Münchberg merged with SC Eintracht Münchberg. On June 4, 2018, FC Eintracht Münchberg's secondary team got promoted to the Kreisliga. Despite the early end of their 2019–20 season of the Bezirksliga, due to the COVID-19 pandemic, the team were still given promotion to the Landesliga. The primary team were able to get promotion to the Bayernliga on May 18, 2024. In the 2024–25 season, Eintracht Münchberg only got 20 points and were 17th in the Bayernliga, forcing the team to play in the relegation playoff against FSV Stadeln. After drawing in their first game against FSV Stadeln, they lost in their second game by 3 goals, relegating Eintracht Münchberg to the Landesliga Nordost.

== Women's Team ==
FC Eintracht's women's team currently plays in the Bezirksliga Ost (7th Division). The team is also owned by TSV Himmelkron.

== Futsal Team ==
FC Eintracht's Futsal team plays in the Lotto Bayern Hallencup. As of January 1, 2025, the futsal team is currently in the final group stage of the competition.

== Honors ==
Landesliga Bayern-Nordost: Champions: 2023-24

Bezirksliga Oberfranken Ost: *2019-20

- 2019-20 season ended early due to COVID-19
