= FC Münchberg =

- Full name: Fußballclub Münchberg von 1910 e.V.
- Founded: 22 August 1910
- Dissolved: 2000
- League: defunct

The FC Münchberg is a defunct German association football club from the town of Münchberg, Bavaria.

The club's most successful era was in the late 1960s when it spent a single season in the tier three Bayernliga.

== History ==
Formed in 1910, FC Münchberg has been, during most of its history, an undistinguished amateur side in local Bavarian football.

The club was promoted to the Landesliga Bayern-Nord in 1965, spending the next three seasons in this league. The club was a strong side in the league during this time, finishing in the top six each year and culminating in a league championship in 1968. The latter allowed the club promotion to the tier three Bayernliga for the first time, but FC Münchberg lasted for only one season there, coming seventeenth and being relegated back to the Landesliga again.

Back in this league, the club played another four good seasons, with a third place in 1971 as its best result. In the 1973–74 season however, FC Münchberg came seventeenth and was relegated to the Bezirksliga Oberfranken-Ost. After three seasons at this level, the team bounced back to the Landesliga in 1977 and played three more Landesliga seasons until 1980. A sixth place in 1979 as its best result was followed by another seventeenth place finish the year after and another relegation. FC Münchberg continued its back-and-forth existence between Bezirksliga and Landesliga after this, playing in the former between 1980 and 1982 and, again, in 1984–85 and in the latter in between. This era came to an end in 1987 when the club finished eighteenth in the Landesliga and was permanently relegated, never to return to this league.

In 1988, the club became a founding member of the Bezirksoberliga Oberfranken, a league newly slotted between the Landesliga and the Bezirksliga. FC Münchberg played the next five seasons at this level, with an eighth place finish in 1991 as its best result. In 1993, the club came fifteenth in the league and was relegated from this level. FC Münchberg played in the Bezirksliga until 1998 when the club was relegated from this level as well. It made a return to this level for its very last season in 1999–2000, but finished once more on a relegation rank.

On 19 February 2000, the club merged with SC Eintracht Münchberg to form FC Eintracht Münchberg.

== Honours ==
The club's honours:

- Landesliga Bayern-Nord
  - Champions: 1968
- Bezirksliga Oberfranken-Ost
  - Champions: 1977
