= Eppelein von Gailingen =

Franconian robber baron

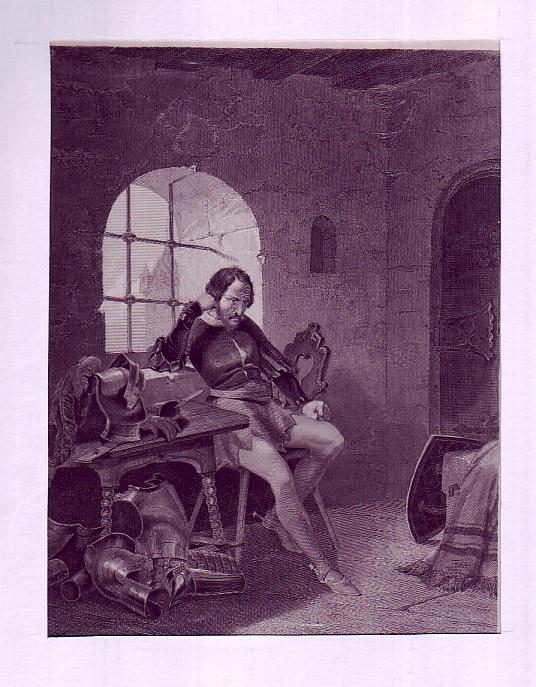
Eppelein in prison.

Eppelein von Gailingen, latinized as Apollonius von Gailingen (born c. 1315 in Illesheim, Middle Franconia; died 15 May 1381 in Neumarkt in der Oberpfalz) was a famous German robber baron in the Middle Ages.

== Life ==
Von Gailingen's date of birth is not confirmed, different sources name dates between 1300 and 1330. Starting in the 1360s he robbed merchant vehicles traveling to and from the rich merchant town of Nuremberg. In 1369, he was indicted for his robberies by the Court of Nuremberg which declared the imperial ban on him. When his castle was destroyed in 1372 Eppelein first escaped but was betrayed shortly after and captured at Forchheim. He was sentenced to death by hanging in Nuremberg.

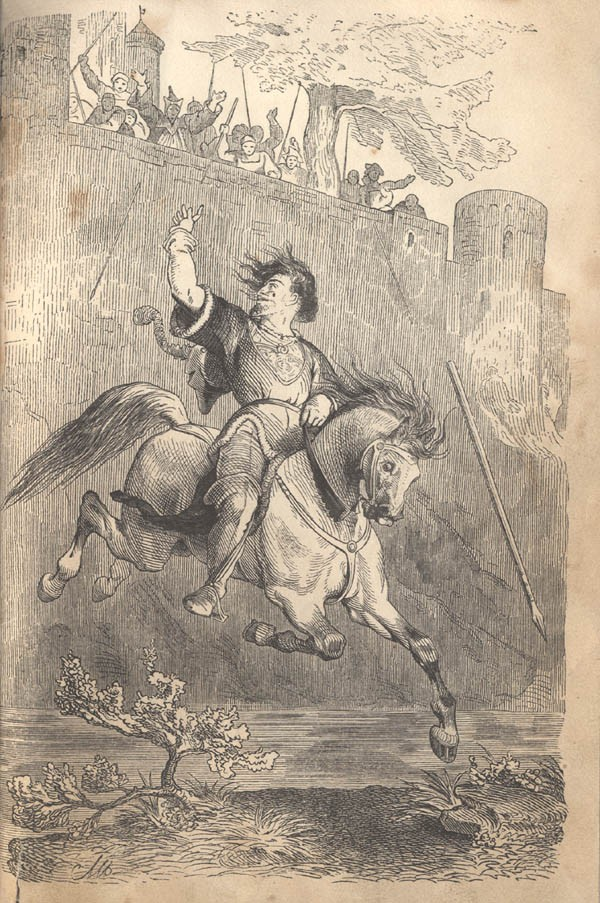
Eppelein's escape.

As legend tells it, when the day of the hanging came his final wish was to sit on his horse for one last time. Since the execution took place inside Nuremberg Castle, the wish was granted. Eppelein took the opportunity to escape by galloping to the wall and forcing his horse to jump above it into the moat. On his flight from Nuremberg, he was met by a peasant who wanted to witness the execution of the famous robber baron and asked him if he would be in time to see the hanging. Eppelein's purportedly responded, "The Nurembergians will hang nobody - if they hadn't him before" ("Die Nürnberger hängen keinen – sie hätten ihn denn zuvor!").

In 1381 he was caught together with his men at a drinking feast in Postbauer-Heng and executed by breaking wheel.

== Aftermath ==
The jump from the walls of Nuremberg Castle was an exciting incident at that time. In the 16th century, the first folk songs were recorded about him and gradually he became a legendary romantic hero. This was supported by the fact that 50 years after Eppelein's jump the walls were destroyed and rebuilt much more massive than before. Today markings are shown on the castle wall as remains of the jump.
