= Absberg =

- Municipality
- Coat of arms

- Location of Absberg within Weißenburg-Gunzenhausen district
- Interactive map of Absberg
- Location within Germany Location within Bavaria
- Coordinates: 49°09′N 10°53′E
- Country: Germany
- State: Bavaria
- Admin. region: Mittelfranken
- District: Weißenburg-Gunzenhausen
- Municipal assoc.: Gunzenhausen
- Subdivisions: 3 Ortsteile

Government
  - Mayor (2020–26): Helmut Schmaußer

Area
  - Total: 18.99 km^{2} (7.33 sq mi)
- Elevation: 467 m (1,532 ft)

Population (2025-12-31)
  - Total: 1,435
  - Density: 75.57/km^{2} (195.7/sq mi)
- Time zone: UTC+01:00 (CET)
  - Summer (DST): UTC+02:00 (CEST)
- Postal codes: 91720
- Dialling codes: 09175
- Vehicle registration: WUG
- Website: www.absberg.de

Absberg is a municipality in the Weißenburg-Gunzenhausen district, in Bavaria, Germany.

The Absberg family was named by this place and had their home castle there.
