= Swabian League =

15th-century military alliance

- Schwäbischer Bund
- Arms

- Standard
- Named after: Swabia
- Formation: February 14, 1488
- Founder: Frederick III
- Founded at: Esslingen
- Dissolved: February 2, 1534
- Type: Military alliance
- Location: Holy Roman Empire
- Region served: Southern Germany
- Official language: German

The Swabian League (German: Schwäbischer Bund) was a military alliance of imperial estates – imperial cities, prelates, principalities and knights – principally in the territory of the early medieval stem duchy of Swabia established in 1488. New institutions created through imperial reform removed the need for the league, whilst the religious revolution of the Protestant Reformation divided its members, leading to the Swabian League being disbanded in 1534.

== History ==
The Swabian League was established in 1488 at the behest of Emperor Frederick III and supported as well by Bertold, Elector of Mainz, whose conciliar rather than monarchic view of the Reich often put him at odds with Frederick's successor Maximilian. The Swabian League cooperated towards the keeping of the imperial peace and at least in the beginning curbing the expansionist Bavarian dukes from the House of Wittelsbach and the revolutionary threat from the south in the form of the Swiss. The League held regular meetings, supported tribunals and maintained a unified force of 12,000 infantrymen and 1200 cavalry.

On 14 February 1488, a new Swabian League was formed, at the Reichstag of Esslingen, not only of 22 Imperial cities but also of the Swabian knights' League of St. George's Shield, bishops, and princes (Ansbach, Baden, Bavaria, Bayreuth, Hesse, Mainz, the Electorate of the Palatinate, Trier, Tyrol, and Württemberg). The league was governed by a federal council of three colleges of princes, cities, and knights calling upon an army of 13,000 men. It aided in the rescue of the future emperor Maximilian I, son of Emperor Frederick III, held prisoner in the Low Countries, and later was his main support in southern Germany.

After the death of Eberhard of Württemberg in 1496 the League produced no single outstanding generally accepted leader, and with the peace of 1499 with the Swiss and the definitive defeat of the aggressive Wittelsbachs in 1504, the League's original purpose, maintenance of the status quo in the southwest, was accomplished. Its last major action was the occupation and annexation of the Free City of Reutlingen by duke Ulrich of Württemberg in 1519 during the interregnum that followed the death of Maximilian I. The duke was overthrown, and his territory was sold to Charles V, offsetting the costs of the campaign.

The League defeated an alliance of robber barons in the Franconian War in 1523. Next it helped to suppress the Peasants' Revolt in 1524–26, including its defeat and execution of Little Jack (Jaecklein) Rohrbach, and crushing the Black Company in its last stand at the Battle of Ingolstadt in May 1525.

The development of imperial institutions, such as the creation of the Reichskammergericht imperial court in 1495 and the development of the Reichstag, led to the league becoming increasingly unnecessary. Imperial institutions were viewed as a better system of maintaining order due to their stronger constitutional backing and sanction by the emperor, and were more popular amongst the princes for being ordered more hierarchically than the Swabian league. The Habsburgs also favoured imperial institutions over the league as imperial institutions could cover the entire empire, and did not have to be continually renewed. Additionally, the religious revolution of the Protestant Reformation divided its members, finally leading to the Swabian League being disbanded in 1534.

== Members ==
- Sigismund of Habsburg, Count of Tyrol and Archduke of Further Austria, followed by Archduke Maximilian I of Habsburg in 1490
- Eberhard V, Count of Württemberg (raised to a duke in 1495), succeeded by Duke Eberhard II in 1496

joined by several princes of the Empire until 1489:

- Frederick II of Hohenzollern, Prince-Bishop of Augsburg
- Christopher I, Margrave of Baden
- George Frederick of Hohenzollern, Margrave of Brandenburg-Ansbach
- Siegmund of Hohenzollern, Margrave of Brandenburg-Bayreuth
- Bertold von Henneberg-Römhild, Archbishop of Mainz and Prince-elector
- John II of Baden, Archbishop of Trier and Prince-elector

extended after 1500 by its former opponent:

- Albert IV of Wittelsbach, Duke of Bavaria-Munich, Duke of re-united Bavaria from 1503.

In 1512 Baden and Württemberg left the league, while the Prince-Bishops of Bamberg and Eichstätt were admitted, followed by

- Philip I, Landgrave of Hesse in 1519
- Louis V of Wittelsbach of the Electorate of the Palatinate, Prince-elector as well as
- Otto Henry and Philip of Wittelsbach, Counts Palatine of Palatinate-Neuburg and
- Conrad II von Thüngen, Prince-Bishop of Würzburg in 1523 and finally
- Matthäus Lang von Wellenburg, Prince-Archbishop of Salzburg in 1525.
