= Stockenroth =

- Location within Germany
- Coordinates: 50.161°N 11.819°E
- Country: Germany

Stockenroth is a village now belonging to Sparneck in the Hof district, Bavaria, Germany.

== Geography ==
The village is situated on the river Saale between the Fichtel Mountains and Franconian Forest. The highest point is the Schachtel- or Schlegelsberg (591 m) in the southwest, lowest point is the Saale (512 m). The village has, together with the twin-village Germersreuth 110 inhabitants. The only four original homestead farms where situated in a loose manner around the small creek Foehrenbach, which flows into the Saxonian Saale after only a short way. All four original houses face the center of the village, an unusual set up, as normally the houses at that time faced south.

== History ==
Stockenroth-Germersreuth, as the village officially is named, was founded in the beginning of the 12th century by the Walpots. Shortly after foundation the power was transferred to the Knights of Sparneck. These put their lands in 1356 under the Bohemian crown, a state that only changed when the Principality of Bayreuth became an integral part of Prussia in 1792.

Castle Stockenroth was the seat of the administration for the surrounding villages from 1563 until 1731. During that era the village and its castle were heavily used for hunting purposes by the margraves of the Principality of Bayreuth. During that reign of the Hohenzollern, which lasted in Stockenroth till 1806, the castle was also a centre of horse breeding, related of the famous Trakehner horses in then Prussian Lithuania. It was also relevant in introducing the potato as a staple food in Prussia through its connections to Bohemia, which was then reigned by the Habsburg dynasty and therefore had indirect access to the Spanish colonies.

== Culture ==
The sports club ASV Stockenroth has 220 members. Main sports is football (soccer), cross-country skiing, and athletics. The auxiliary fire brigade Stockenroth was founded 1875. As the then ruling Hohenzollern became Protestants in the 16th century, the inhabitants are mainly of Lutheran believe.
