= Münchberg =

- Town
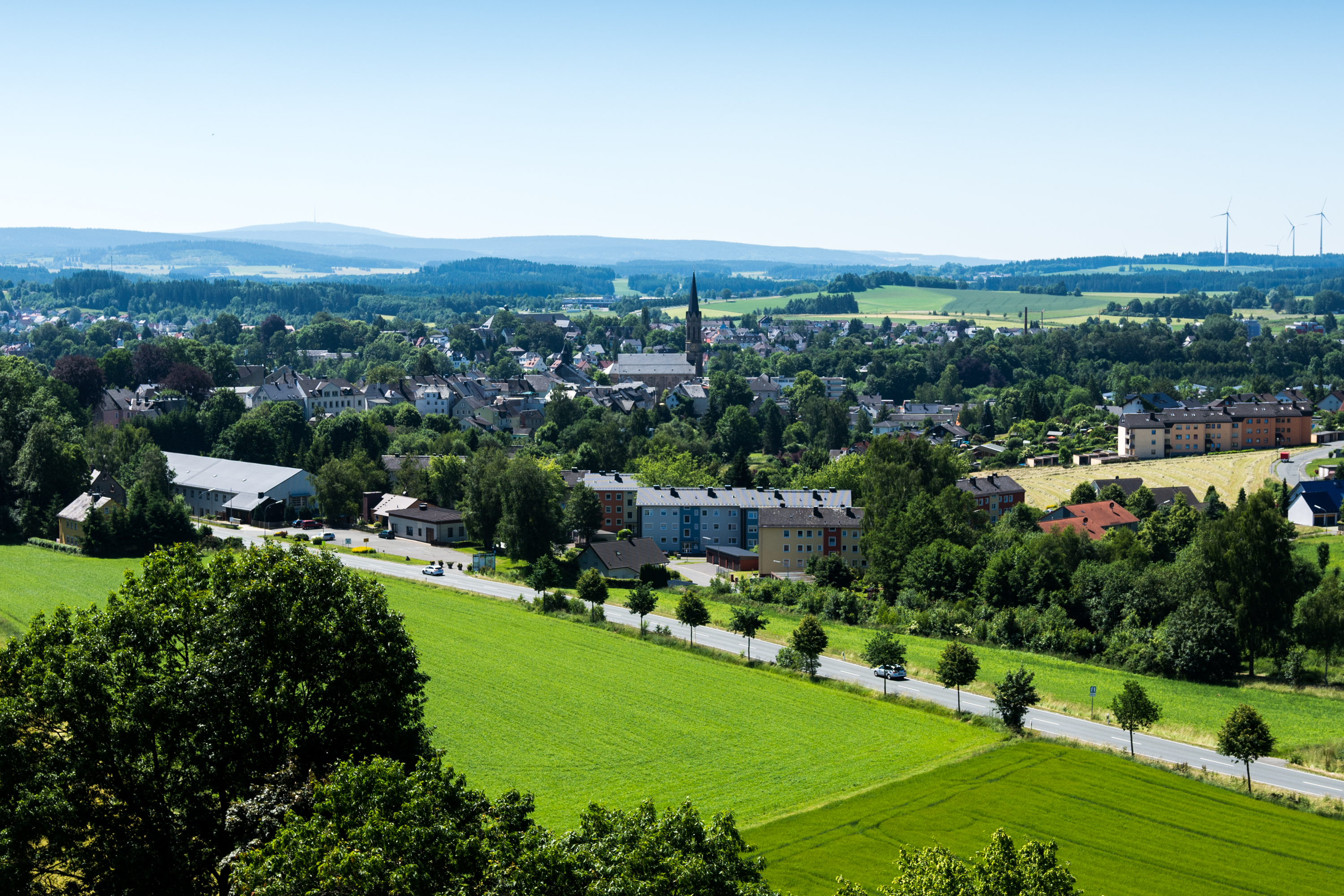
- View towards Münchberg

- Coat of arms

- Location of Münchberg within Hof district
- Interactive map of Münchberg
- Location within Germany Location within Bavaria
- Coordinates: 50°12′N 11°46′E
- Country: Germany
- State: Bavaria
- Admin. region: Oberfranken
- District: Hof

Government
  - Mayor (2026–32): Christian Zuber (SPD)

Area
  - Total: 68.78 km^{2} (26.56 sq mi)
- Elevation: 546 m (1,791 ft)

Population (2025-12-31)
  - Total: 9,884
  - Density: 143.7/km^{2} (372.2/sq mi)
- Time zone: UTC+01:00 (CET)
  - Summer (DST): UTC+02:00 (CEST)
- Postal codes: 95213
- Dialling codes: 09251
- Vehicle registration: HO, MÜB, NAI, REH, SAN
- Website: www.muenchberg.de

Münchberg (German pronunciation: [ˈmʏnçˌbɛʁk]) is a small town in the Hof district of the Upper Franconia (Oberfranken) region of Bavaria, Germany.

Its sister city is Jefferson City, in the U.S. state of Missouri.

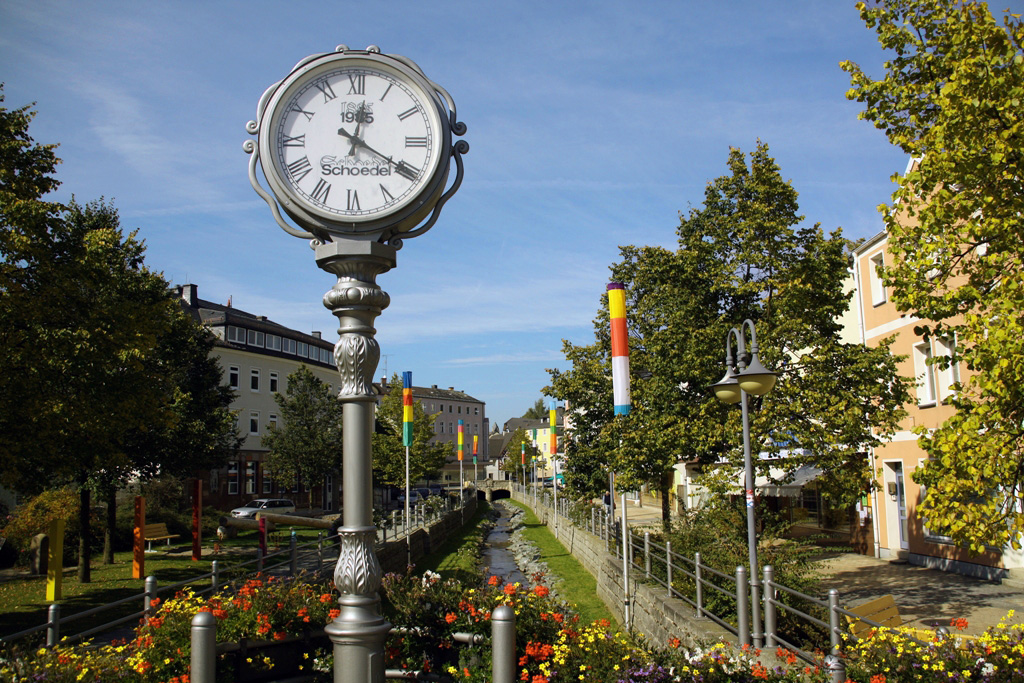
Pedestrian zone of Münchberg

== Geography ==
=== The town districts ===
- Ahornis
- Biengarten
- Gottersdorf
- Grund
- Hilbrandsgrün
- Jehsen
- Laubersreuth
- Laubersreuth
- Markersreuth
- Maxreuth
- Mechlenreuth
- Neutheilung
- Meierhof
- Mussen
- Pulschnitzberg
- Plösen
- Poppenreuth
- Sauerhof
- Schlegel
- Schödlas
- Schotteneinzel
- Schweinsbach
- Solg
- Straas
- Unfriedsdorf

== History ==
The first settlement of the area around Münchberg probably dates back to the 10th century. The origin of the name “Münchberg” is still a matter of debate. Some believe that the name derived from monks who were said to have lived in the town. That is why a monk was included in the town’s coat of arms. However, there is no prove to this theory. Documents first mentioned Münchberg as "Munchiberc" in around 1224.

Between 1938 and 1978, Münchberg was district town of the district of the same name. Because of its once-thriving textile industry, Münchberg was sometimes referred to as the “Textile Town of Bavaria.”

== Public Infrastructure ==
There is a hospital in Münchberg (Klinik Münchberg, part of the Hochfranken Kliniken).

There is one elementary school (Grundschule Münchberg ) and two secondary schools (Gymnasium Münchberg and Mittelschule Poppenreuth). In addition, there is a branch campus of Hof University of Applied Sciences that focuses on design and textile studies. A division of the Fraunhofer Institute that specializes in technical textiles is located in Münchberg, cooperating with the Hof University of Applied Sciences.

Münchberg has a public library, which, as of 2026, held approximately 18,000 media items.

The town has a community center that offers a variety of programs: after-school and summer care for children and teens, various art classes, a small stage for events, and a small art gallery with rotating exhibitions. The newly renovated “Schützenhaus” serves as an event venue.

The city has two parks: The city park near the hospital and the “Hintere Höhe” recreational area, which features a children’s playground, a lake, and various sports fields.

Münchberg’s municipal utilities operate a public indoor swimming pool and an outdoor pool with several pools, a large slide, and a jumping tower.

There is a police station, a volunteer fire department, and the City Hall, which houses the civil registry office, the public order office, and the residents’ registration office. Münchberg has a recycling center operated by the “Abfallzweckverband Hof.”

There are two Evangelical Lutheran churches, one Catholic church, and a mosque. In addition, there is a Kingdom Hall of Jehovah's Witnesses and a New Apostolic Church. The population of Münchberg is mainly Evangelical Lutheran.

== Sport ==
The town's association football club, FC Münchberg, experienced its greatest success in the late sixties when it spent a season in the third division Bayernliga. In 2000 the club merged with SC Eintracht Münchberg to form FC Eintracht Münchberg.
