= Robber baron (feudalism) =

Feudal landowner who engaged in banditry

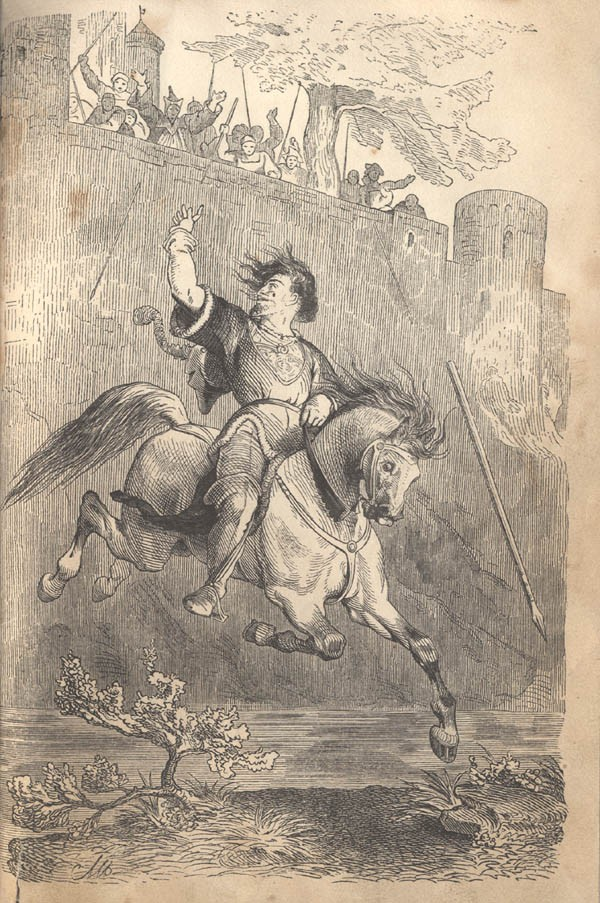
Legendary Raubritter Eppelein von Gailingen (1311–1381) during his escape from Nuremberg Castle

A robber baron or robber knight (German: Raubritter) was an unscrupulous feudal landowner who, protected by his fief's legal status, imposed high taxes and tolls out of keeping with the norm without authorization by some higher authority. Some resorted to actual banditry. The German term for robber barons, Raubritter (robber knights), was coined by Friedrich Bottschalk in 1810.

Some robber barons violated the custom under which tolls were collected on the Rhine either by charging higher tolls than the standard or by operating without authority from the Holy Roman Emperor altogether. During the period in the history of the Holy Roman Empire known as the Great Interregnum (1250–1273), the number of such tolling stations exploded in the absence of Imperial authority.

Medieval robber barons most often imposed high or unauthorized tolls on rivers or roads passing through their territory. Some robbed merchants, land travelers, and river traffic—seizing money, cargoes, even entire ships—or engaged in kidnapping for ransom.

== Germany ==
=== Early development ===
Tolls were collected from ships sailing on the River Rhine in Europe for one thousand years from around 800 AD to 1800 AD. During this time, various feudal lords (among them archbishops who held fiefs from the Holy Roman Emperor) collected tolls from passing cargo ships to bolster their finances. Only the Holy Roman Emperor could authorise the collection of such tolls. Allowing the nobility and Church to collect tolls from the busy traffic on the Rhine seems to have been an attractive alternative to other means of taxation and funding of government functions.

Iron chains were often stretched across the river to prevent passage without paying the toll, and strategic towers were built to facilitate this.

The Holy Roman Emperor and the various noblemen and archbishops who were authorised to levy tolls seem to have worked out an informal way of regulating this process. Among the decisions involved in managing the collection of tolls on the Rhine were how many toll stations to have, where they should be built, how high the tolls should be, and the advantages/disadvantages. While this decision process was made no less complex by being informal, common factors included the local power structure (archbishops and nobles being the most likely recipients of a charter to collect tolls), space between toll stations (authorized toll stations seem to have been at least five kilometres apart), and ability to be defended from attack (some castles through which tolls were collected were tactically useful until the French invaded in 1689 and levelled them). Tolls were standardized either in terms of an amount of silver coin allowed to be charged or an "in-kind" toll of cargo from the ship.

The men who came to be known as robber barons or robber knights (German: Raubritter) violated the structure under which tolls were collected on the Rhine either by charging higher tolls than the standard or by operating without authority from the Holy Roman Emperor altogether.

Writers of the period referred to these practices as "unjust tolls," and not only did the robber barons thereby violate the prerogatives of the Holy Roman Emperor, they also went outside of the society's behavioural norms, since merchants were bound both by law and religious custom to charge a "just price" for their wares.

=== Great Interregnum ===
During the period in the history of the Holy Roman Empire known as the Great Interregnum (1250–1273), when there was no Emperor, the number of tolling stations exploded in the absence of imperial authority. In addition, robber barons began to earn their opprobrium by robbing ships of their cargoes, stealing entire ships, and even kidnapping.

In response to this organized, military lawlessness, the "Rheinischer Bund," or Rhine League was formed by 100 Cities, and from several princes and prince-prelates (lords of the Church), all of whom held large stakes in the restoration of law and order to the Rhine.

Officially launched in 1254, the Rhine League wasted no time putting robber barons out of business by the simple expedient of taking and destroying their castles. In the next three years, four robber barons were targeted and between ten and twelve robber castles destroyed or inactivated.

The Rhine League was not only successful in suppressing illicit collection of tolls and river robbery, they also took action against other state aggression. For example, they are documented as having intervened to rescue a victim of abduction by the Baron of Rietberg.

The procedure pioneered by the Rhine League for dealing with robber barons – to besiege, capture and destroy their castles – survived long after the League self-destructed from political strife over the election of a new Emperor and military reversals against unusually strong robber barons.

When the Interregnum ended, the new king Rudolf of Habsburg applied the lessons learned by the Rhine League to the destruction of the highway robbers at Sooneck, torching their castles and hanging them. While robber barony never entirely ceased, especially during the Hundred Years' War, the excesses of their heyday during the Interregnum never recurred.

== England ==
The reign of King Stephen of England (1135–1154) was a long period of civil unrest commonly known as "The Anarchy". In the absence of strong central kingship, the nobility of England were a law unto themselves, as characterised in this excerpt from the Second Continuation of the Peterborough Chronicle:

When the traitors understood that he [i.e. Stephen] was a gentle man, and soft and good, and did not execute justice, they committed all manner of atrocity. Every chieftain made castles and held them against the king; and they filled the land full of castles. They viciously oppressed the poor men of the land with castle-building work; when the castles were made, then they filled the land with devils and evil men. Then they seized those who had any goods, both by night and day, working men and women, and threw them into prison and tortured them for gold and silver with uncountable tortures, for never was there a martyr so tortured as these men were. One they hung by his feet and filled his lungs with smoke. One was hung up by the thumbs and another by the head and had coats of mail hung on his feet. One they put a knotted cord about his head and twisted it so that it went into the brains ... I neither can nor may recount all the atrocities nor all the tortures that [i.e. the barons] did on the wretched men of this land.

== Literature references ==
Michael Heller refers to the original robber barons to illustrate his tragedy of the anticommons in his 2008 book. The tragedy of the anticommons is a type of coordination breakdown, in which a single resource has numerous rightsholders who prevent others from using it, frustrating what would be a socially desirable outcome.

In Ken Follett's historical novel The Pillars of the Earth, taking place in England during The Anarchy, the main villain is a vicious and ruthless earl who behaves as described in the quote above.

== See also ==
- Robber baron (industrialist)
- Rent-seeking

== Sources ==
- Zmora, Hillay (13 November 2003). State and Nobility in Early Modern Germany: The Knightly Feud in Franconia, 1440–1567. Cambridge University Press. ISBN 978-0-521-52265-6.
