= Charles the Bold =

Duke of Burgundy from 1467 to 1477

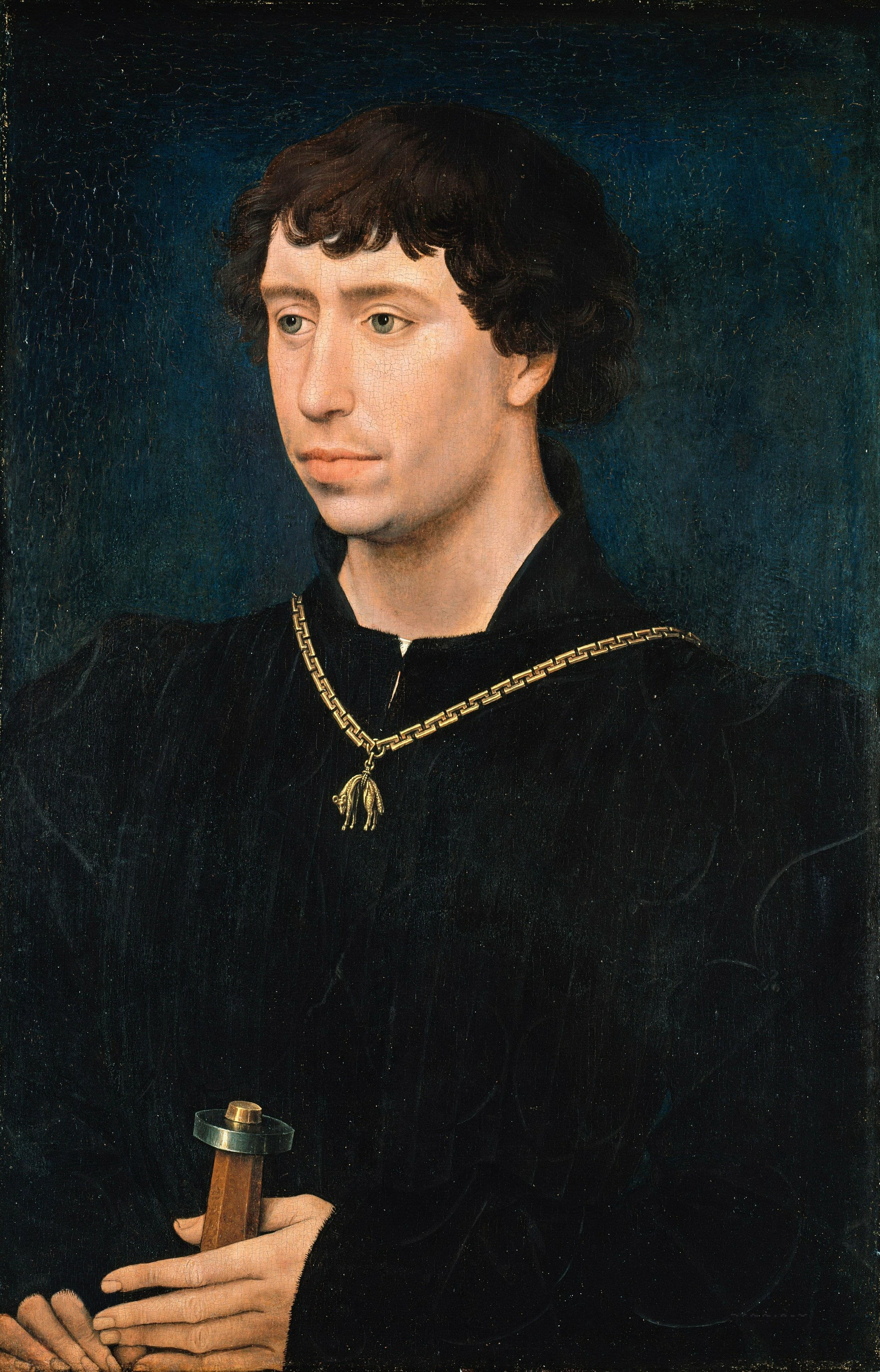
- Charles the Bold in about 1461–1462, wearing the collar of the Order of the Golden Fleece, painted by Rogier van der Weyden

Duke of Burgundy
- Reign: 15 June 1467 – 5 January 1477
- Predecessor: Philip the Good
- Successor: Mary the Rich
- Born: 10 November 1433; Dijon, Burgundy
- Died: 5 January 1477 (aged 43); Nancy, Lorraine
- Burial: Church of Our Lady, Bruges
- Spouses: Catherine of France (m. 1440; died 1446) Isabella of Bourbon (m. 1454; died 1465) Margaret of York (m. 1468)
- Issue: Mary of Burgundy
Names
- Charles Martin
- House: Valois-Burgundy
- Father: Philip the Good
- Mother: Isabella of Portugal
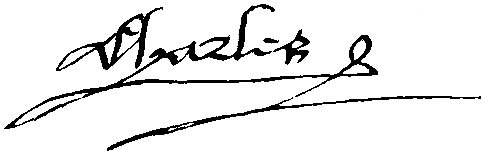
- Signature

Charles the Bold (Charles Martin; 10 November 1433 – 5 January 1477), also called the Rash, (Note: The Latin epithet temerarius was employed by the French as early as 1477, leading to the French form, le Téméraire. The French means 'foolhardy' and 'reckless', hence the translation 'the Rash'. "The Bold" corresponds to le Hardi, the epithet of the progenitor of his family, Philip the Bold. The French form Charles le Hardi has been called "Burgundian propaganda".) was Duke of Burgundy from 1467 to 1477. A member of the House of Valois-Burgundy, he was the only surviving legitimate son of Philip the Good and his third wife, Isabella of Portugal. In his youth, Charles was known for his chivalric ambitions and his admiration for Alexander the Great. As count of Charolais, he clashed with his father's ministers and developed an intense rivalry with King Louis XI of France. In 1465, he formed the League of the Public Weal, a coalition of French feudal lords, and led them in a war against Louis XI.

As duke of Burgundy, Charles inherited a vast but fragmented collection of territories stretching from the Low Countries to the borders of Switzerland. Therefore, he pursued the creation of an independent Burgundian kingdom. To this end, he acquired Guelders and Upper Alsace, sought recognition as King of the Romans, and became increasingly involved in conflicts within the Holy Roman Empire. He married Margaret of York to secure an English alliance, and arranged the betrothal of his only child, Mary, to Maximilian of Austria.

Charles was a patron of music and the arts, especially illuminated manuscripts, and his court was noted for its chivalric culture and elaborate etiquette. He reformed the Burgundian military through continuous military ordinances. Pursuing an aggressive foreign policy, he increased his sphere of influence in Italy, allying himself with Milan, Naples and Venice, but repeatedly declined papal and Venetian requests to undertake a crusade against the Ottoman Empire.

In the final years of his reign, Charles fought the Burgundian Wars against an alliance of Swiss, German, and Alsatian powers while trying to retain control of Upper Alsace. After his unsuccessful siege of Neuss, he was defeated by the Swiss at the battles of Grandson and Morat. He was killed at the Battle of Nancy on 5 January 1477 while fighting René II of Lorraine and his Swiss allies. His death triggered the War of the Burgundian Succession and contributed to the collapse of the Burgundian State. He was succeeded by his only child, Mary.

== Early life ==
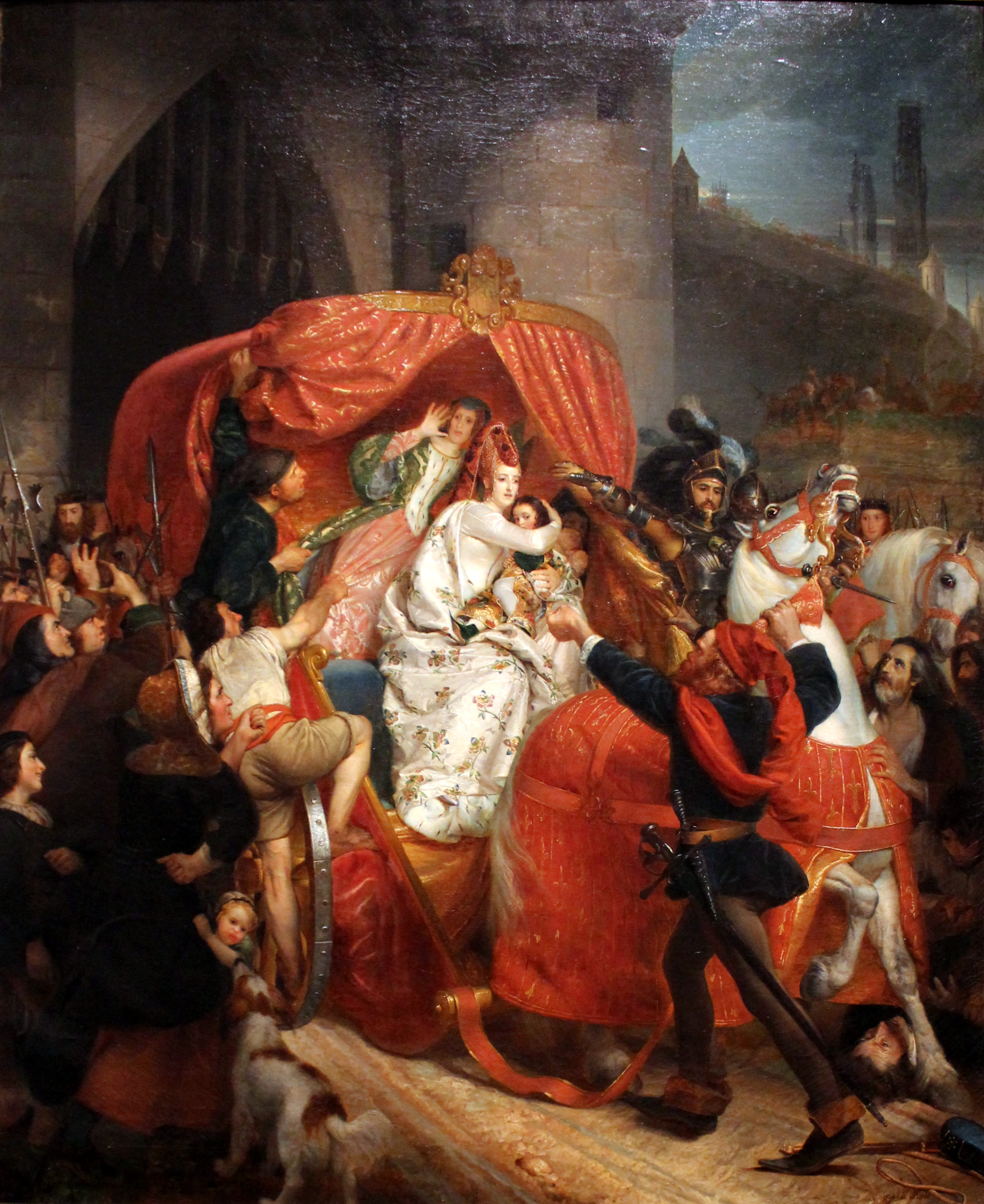
La Duchesse de Bourgogne arrêtée aux portes de Bruges by Sophie Frémiet. 19th-century depiction of the arrest of Isabella of Portugal, her son Charles, and their entourage at the gates of Bruges in 1436.

Charles Martin was born on 10 November 1433 in Dijon, capital of the Duchy of Burgundy. He was the third child of Philip the Good and his third wife Isabella of Portugal and the only one to survive past infancy. Fearing that she would lose another child, Isabella consecrated the infant to the Blessed Sacrament. Philip the Good arrived in Dijon in November to celebrate the birth. He made his son a knight of the Golden Fleece and granted him the title of count of Charolais, traditionally borne by the heirs of the dukes of Burgundy. (Note: The Golden Fleece was a knightly order created by Philip in 1430, and Charolais was a title given to the heirs of the dukes of Burgundy.) Charles was baptised on 20 November. His sponsors were Count Charles of Nevers and Antoine de Croÿ, and he was named after the count of Nevers, Philip the Good's stepson through his second wife, Bonne of Artois.

During infancy, Charles was described as a robust child. Philip appointed numerous tutors for the young Charles, including Antoine Haneron, professor of rhetoric in the University of Louvain. Like his father, Charles developed a fondness for reading histories, chronicles, and historical romances. He aspired to become a conqueror like Alexander the Great. The fact that both he and Alexander had fathers named Philip appears to have stimulated his imagination and encouraged his ambition. From a young age, Charles chose Saint George as his patron saint. He kept a sword purported to have belonged to Saint George in his treasury, and he also revered other warrior saints. Until the age of six, Charles was brought up by his cousins, John and Agnes of Cleves, both children of Mary of Burgundy, daughter of John the Fearless. Of the two, Agnes played the larger role in Charles's early education. She remained in close company with Isabella and Charles.

At the age of six, Charles was married to Catherine of France, the ten-year-old daughter of Charles VII, as part of the Treaty of Arras (1435), which reconciled Philip the Good with the King of France, marking the end of the Armagnac–Burgundian Civil War. As a sign of good faith, Charles VII had agreed to a marriage between one of his daughters and Philip's heir and sent his daughters to Burgundy, where Catherine was chosen. Charles and Catherine were married on 11 June 1439, at Saint-Omer in a ceremony accompanied by concerts, jousts, and banquets. The pair were put under the care of a governess, but were often kept apart and given pursuits suited to their age. Catherine died on 30 July 1446.

In 1441, Philip appointed Jean d'Auxy, seigneur of Auxi-le-Château, as guardian to the eight-year-old Charles. D'Auxy later served as Charles's chamberlain from 1456 to 1468. At the age of 12, Charles began to take part in the public affairs of his father's realm. In 1445, he accompanied his father on a rare state visit to Holland and Zealand.

In 1449, the wealthy city of Ghent rebelled against Burgundian rule in response to new taxes on salt. Charles took part in the fighting, but Philip the Good, wishing to keep him out of danger, sent him to Lille with the false news that his mother Isabella was seriously ill. Charles left shortly before the decisive Battle of Gavere in 1453. In Lille, his mother honoured him with a feast and encouraged him to return to the battlefield and fight for his inheritance. By then, Philip had already defeated the rebellious burghers at Gavere.

Charles remained a widower for eight years before marrying Isabella of Bourbon on 30 October 1454. Isabella, the daughter of Agnes of Burgundy and Charles I, Duke of Bourbon, was Philip the Good's niece. Her father had sent her as a child to the Burgundian court as a ward of Isabella of Portugal. A shy and pliant young woman, she was adored by Philip, who saw the match as an opportunity of renewing the Treaty of Arras after Charles VII's threatening actions towards Burgundy. Charles was not informed of his father's plan until the night before the wedding, but he did not resist the match. As part of Isabella's dowry, the town of Chinon was incorporated into Philip's realm.

== Struggle for power ==
=== Disputes with Philip the Good ===
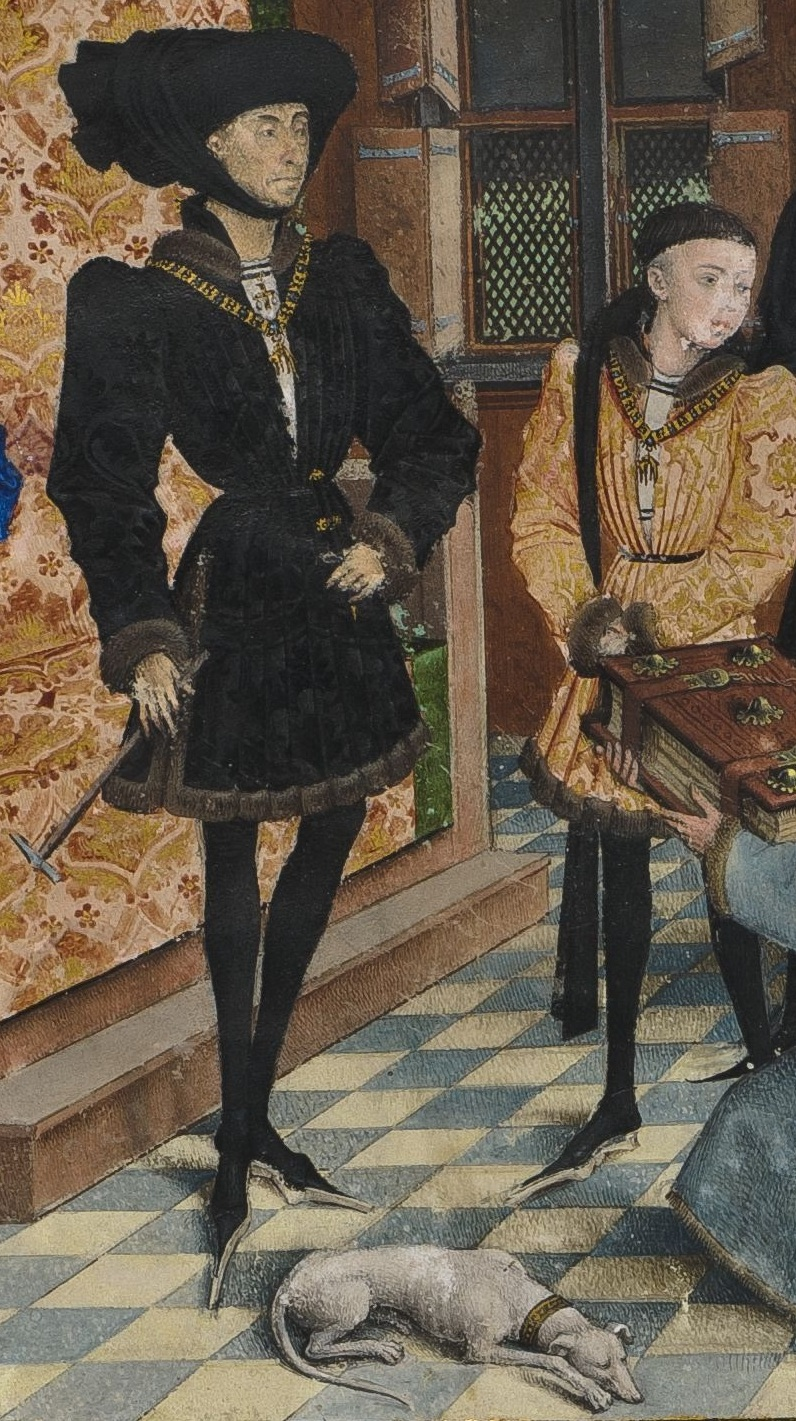
Charles, aged 12 or 13, standing beside his father, Philip, Duke of Burgundy; Jean Wauquelin presenting his 'Chroniques de Hainaut' to Philip the Good, 1447

From 1454 to 1464, Charles was excluded from power by his father and shut out from the ducal council and from influence at the Burgundian court. (Note: From the early stages of his reign, Philip the Good had employed many juridical and political advisors, who were the central institution of the government. In the decade 1435-45, with the acquisition of the Burgundian Netherlands, the state had doubled in size; the need for a specialized council gave rise to the Ducal Council (French: grand conseil), whose ranks were filled with Philip's advisors.) In 1454, Philip appointed him governor and lieutenant-general in absence while he attended the Imperial Diet in Regensburg. But as regent, Charles exercised little power compared with his father and mother. He was nevertheless able to issue documents in his own name. His regency was short-lived. Philip returned to Burgundy on 7 or 9 August, and Charles was once again excluded from power.

Charles's exclusion from power damaged his relationship with his father, and tensions between them came to a head in 1457. Charles wanted to appoint Antoin Rolin, seigneur of Aymeries and son of Nicolas Rolin, Philip the Good's chancellor, as his chamberlain. Philip the Good, wary of the influence this would give his chancellor, refused and instead proposed Philip I of Porcéan, high bailiff of Hainaut and a member of the influential House of Croÿ.

Charles distrusted Philip de Croÿ, whom he suspected of accepting money from Charles VII to undermine Philip the Good, and refused his father's choice. Philip was so angered that Charles's mother feared for Charles's life and had him removed from court. Charles fled to Dendermonde (now in northern Belgium) while Philip lost his way in the forests of Soignies trying to find him. Through the mediation of his wife, who was pregnant, father and son reached a truce. When Charles's daughter, Mary, was born on 13 February 1457, neither Charles nor his father attended her baptism, as both wished to avoid each other.

Nicolas Rolin was removed from the chancellery, and Rolin's close ally, Jean Chevrot, was removed from the ducal council. As a result, the de Croÿ family became more powerful. Charles withdrew from court to his estate at Le Quesnoy in Hainaut, where he was entrusted with minor tasks concerning his father's Flemish subjects. In 1461, he also built the Blue Tower at Gorinchem as a personal residence. He attempted to formalise his position as heir to the Burgundian State, prompting his father to cut off his allowance. As a result, Charles lacked the money to pay his household or maintain his estate. According to Burgundian court chronicler Georges Chastellain, Charles dismissed his staff in 1463 because he could no longer pay them, but they were determined to continue serving him and even offered him part of their own money. According to the German historian Werner Paravicini, such acts of altruism were typical of the time, which made the account more plausible.

In 1462, Charles survived an attempted poisoning by Jehan Coustain, premier valet de chambre, who was executed at Rupelmonde. Charles blamed de Croÿ for the plot, while de Croÿ came to believe that Charles had staged the attempt himself. By the end of 1463, the disputes between Charles and his father grew so serious that the States General of the Burgundian Netherlands intervened. On 5 February 1464, Charles addressed the deputies assembled at Ghent and attacked the Croÿ family. He and Philip reconciled in June 1464, after they met in Lille, although de Croÿ maintained his hold on power. Later that year, Charles secured full authority by arguing that Philip was becoming senile. The States General appointed Charles lieutenant général, giving him effective control of the government. His first act was to confiscate de Croÿ's estates. De Croÿ and his family were then banished to France, where their French patron, Louis XI, offered them no support.

=== Rivalry with Louis XI ===
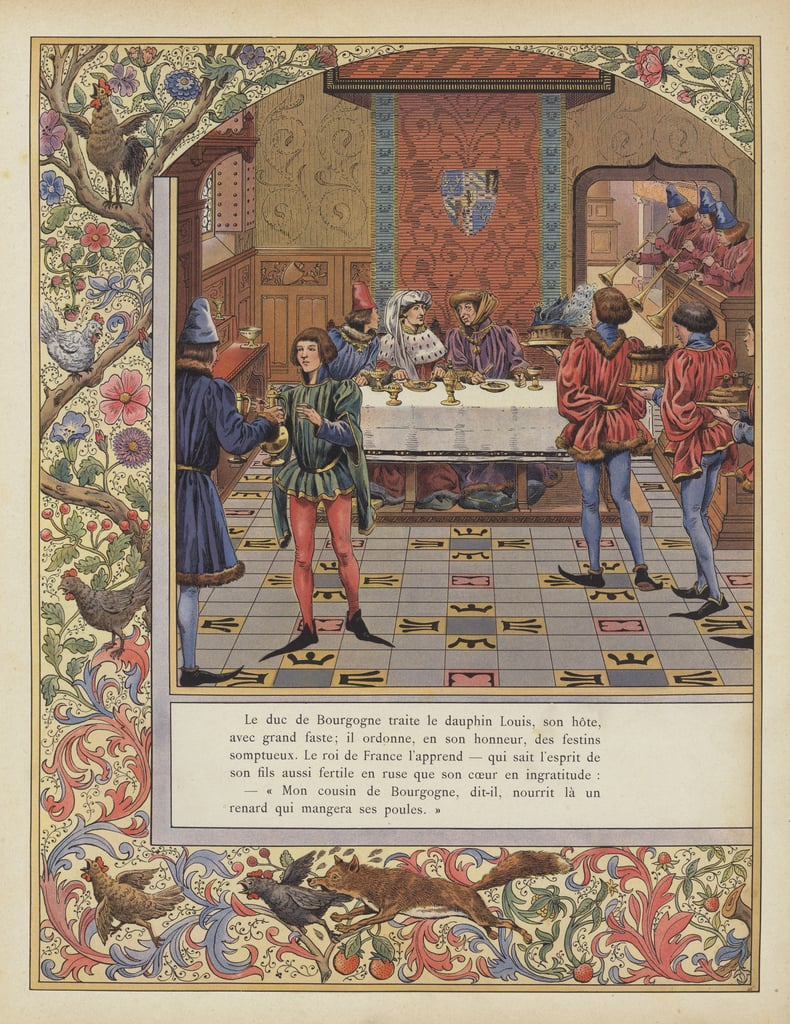
The Duke of Burgundy providing a sumptuous feast for Louis, Dauphin of France, by Job, 1905

In 1457, Louis, Dauphin of France and heir to Charles VII, suddenly arrived at Philip the Good's court at Brussels. Philip saw his guest as an opportunity to mend his relations with the French crown. He received the dauphin warmly, treated him generously, and refused all requests from Charles VII to send him back. At Philip's expense, Louis lived comfortably at Genappe, and went on to become Philip's favourite, partly as a result of Philip's quarrel with his own son.

Despite Louis's friendship with Philip, he and Charles disliked each other. Even so, Charles asked the dauphin to be godfather to his daughter, Mary. His hostility deepened after Louis succeeded his father on 22 July 1461. Charles feared Louis intended to dismantle the Burgundian defensive system in Picardy, and he was angered by the crisis over the Somme towns in the autumn of 1463. De Croÿ persuaded Philip to amend the Treaty of Arras and return towns including Saint-Quentin, Abbeville, Amiens, Péronne, and Montdidier to the French crown in exchange for 400,000 gold écus from Louis to return those cities to the crown domains. After Charles was appointed lieutenant général in 1464, he moved openly against Louis by forming the League of the Public Weal.

The League of the Public Weal was a confederation of prominent French princes formed to undermine Louis XI's authority. Its leading members included Charles of Berry (the king's brother), Francis II, Duke of Brittany, John II, Duke of Bourbon, and Jacques and John d'Armagnac. The league declared Charles of Berry regent of France and appointed Francis II captain general of the army. As rebellion loomed, Louis offered to pardon all the dukes and lords involved. The lesser lords accepted the pardon, but the leading princes persisted with their demands. The members of the league then chose Charles as their leader and began to assemble an army. The league became the most dangerous in a series of princely revolts against the French crown; one chronicle recorded the number of the participants against Louis XI to be seven dukes, twelve counts, two lords, one marshal, and 51,000 men-at-arms.

To counteract the rebels, Louis XI raised an army and marched south into central France to defeat John II of Bourbon. Charles soon mustered an army of 25,000 men and marched towards Paris. Louis then hastily returned to Paris to defend the city. On 15 July, Charles reached the village of Montlhéry and discovered that the royal army was camped a few miles south at Arpajon. On learning of Charles's position, Louis moved to engage him.

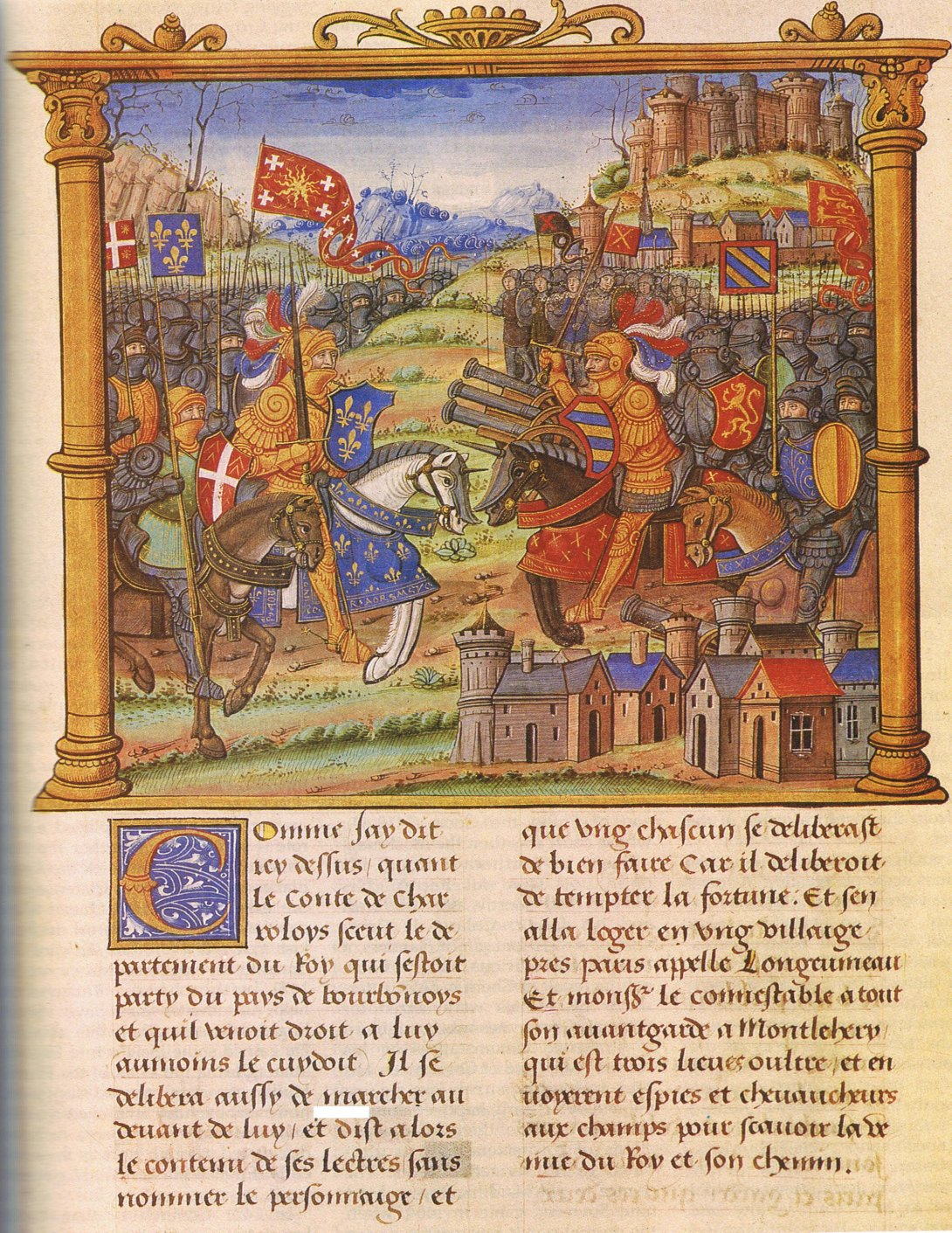
Battle of Montlhéry, early-16th-century miniature illustrating Philippe de Commines

On 16 July 1465, the two armies met and fought the Battle of Montlhéry. Charles positioned himself beside the Burgundian vanguard under Louis of Saint-Pol. He attacked the French left flank, commanded by Charles IV, Count of Maine. While pursuing the fleeing count and his men, he was caught by a French counterattack and wounded in the throat, but escaped capture and returned to his lines. He then ordered his gunners to fire on the royal army; according to his own account, 1,200–1,400 men and many horses were killed. By evening, Louis XI had retreated eastwards to Paris.

While each side claimed victory at Montlhéry, neither achieved all its objectives. Charles failed to capture Louis on the battlefield, while Louis failed to prevent Charles from joining his allies. The rebel armies joined at Étampes and began marching towards Paris on 31 July. They then laid siege to Paris, during which Charles directed artillery fire against the city's walls. The rebels entered the city when the nobleman Charles de Melun opened the Saint-Antoine gate for them. Louis XI was then forced to negotiate. The resulting Treaty of Conflans granted the Normandy to Charles, Duke of Berry, and returned the Somme lands to Burgundy.

== Duke of Burgundy ==
=== Ascension ===
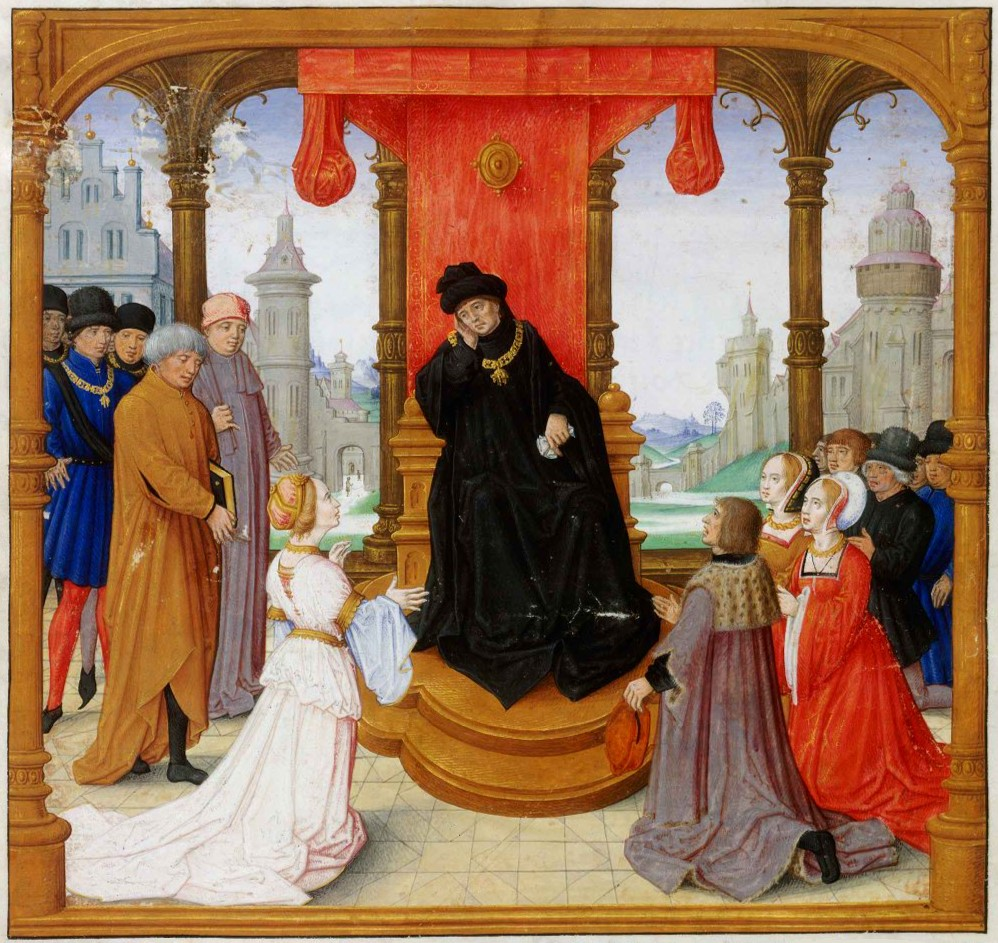
Charles the Bold in mourning attire after the death of Philip the Good. Georges Chastellain stands on the left with greying hair and carrying a book. Illumination from a manuscript of Chastellain's Chronicle of the Dukes of Burgundy

On 12 June 1467, Philip the Good suddenly fell ill. Charles was summoned from Ghent to come to his father at once. By the time he arrived, Philip had fallen unconscious and died on 15 June. Charles arranged for his father's funeral to be held in St. Donatian's Cathedral. It was attended by 1,200 people from the households of both Charles and Philip. During the funeral, Charles displayed intense emotion: he shook, trembled, pulled his hair, and repeatedly shouted and wept. The court chronicler, Georges Chastellain, doubted the sincerity of his distress and expressed astonishment that he could show such emotion.

Fourteen days later, Charles formally assumed the title of Duke of Burgundy. In celebration, he made a Joyous Entry into Ghent on 28 June 1467, emulating Caesar. The entry provoked unrest in the city. The people demanded an end to the humiliating penalties imposed after the revolt of 1449. Charles left Ghent with his ten-year-old daughter Mary and the treasure kept by Philip at the Prinsenhof. The following January, he coerced the mayors of Ghent into asking for his pardon. He then abolished their governmental rights and announced that only he could appoint the town government, in contravention of Philip IV's constitution of 1301.

=== Territorial expansion ===
Like his father, Charles pursued territorial expansion, but whereas Philip the Good relied on diplomacy and inheritance, Charles sought to enlarge his realm more aggressively. In the Netherlands, he looked to the north-east, especially the Duchy of Guelders. Although Guelders had never formed part of the Burgundian lands, it was economically dependent on Burgundian trade.

In 1463, Adolf of Egmond rebelled against his father, the ruling duke, Arnold. With Philip the Good's support, Adolf usurped the duchy and imprisoned his father in 1465. Adolf's treatment of his father caused a scandal that reached Rome, where the Pope sought a mediator to end the conflict in Guelders. In 1471, Charles was appointed to mediate and marched into Guelders to restore Arnold to power. Adolf was placed under house arrest and, after a failed escape attempt, imprisoned. To retain Burgundian support, Arnold made Charles Regent of Guelders. When Arnold died in February 1473, having left no heirs but his imprisoned son, he bequeathed the duchy to Charles.

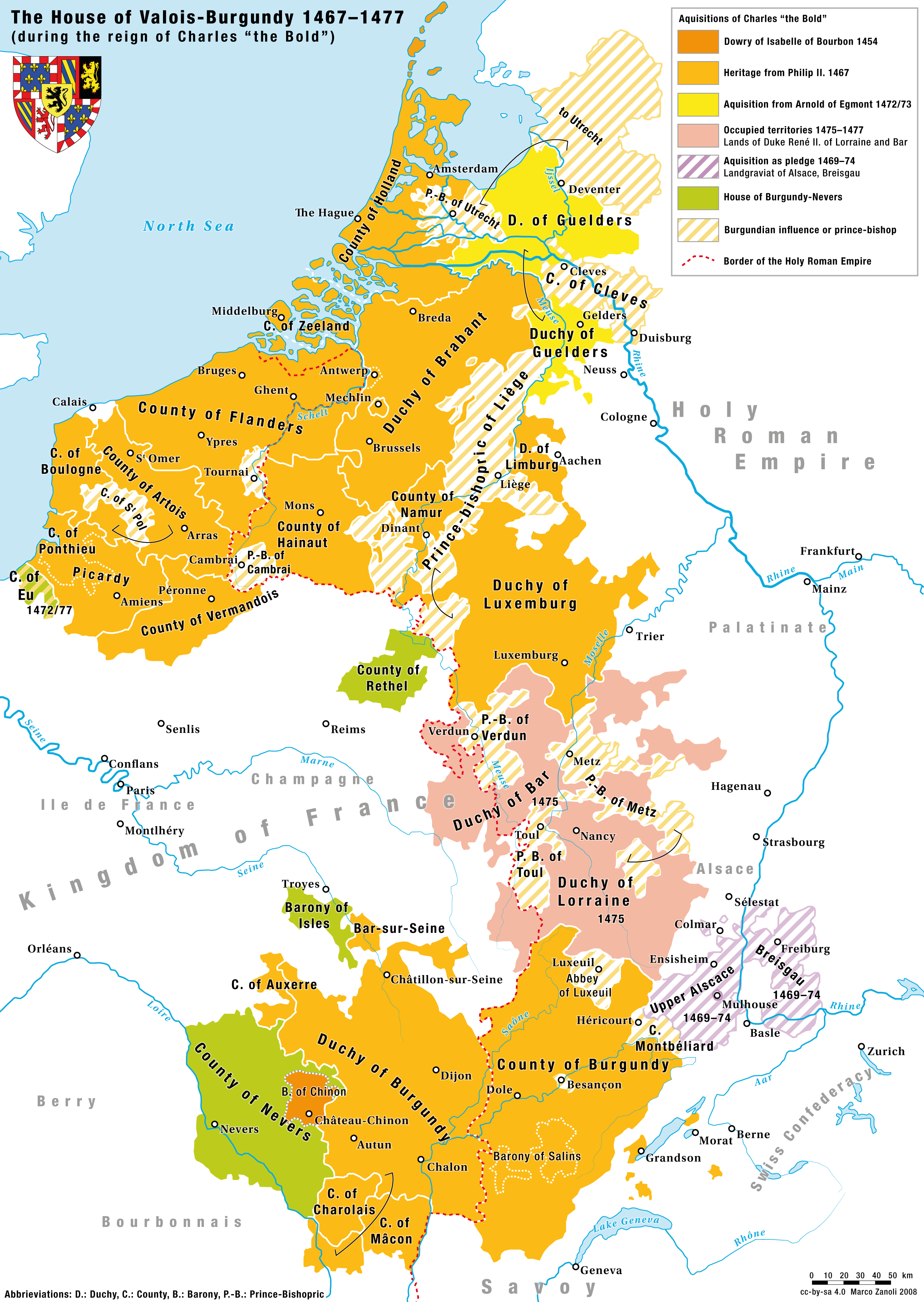
Valois Burgundy at its greatest extent under Charles the Bold

Charles's inheritance met with opposition. The Estates of Guelders, along with the towns of Nijmegen, Arnhem, and Zutphen, rejected Arnold's will, and Louis XI asked Frederick III, Holy Roman Emperor, to confiscate the duchy. Frederick, however, was diplomatically close to Charles and did not intervene. Charles subdued the rebelling cities and the nobles of Guelders by force.

On 9 June 1473, he entered Maastricht with a sizeable army and met little resistance. Roermond and Venlo quickly surrendered, while Moers, led by Count Vincent von Moers, yielded to Charles's artillery. The only serious resistance came at the siege of Nijmegen, which only surrendered after inflicting heavy losses on the Burgundian army. After conquering Guelders, Charles imposed heavy taxes, replaced local aldermen, and gave greater authority to ducal judicial officers to centralise the administration.

The Burgundian state under Charles was divided between two main areas, the Duchy of Burgundy in the south and Flanders in the north. To unite them, Charles needed control of the Duchy of Lorraine and Alsace. On 21 March 1469, he received Sigismund, Archduke of Austria at his court to negotiate the purchase of Sigismund's lands in Upper Alsace. Sigismund was in desperate financial straits and readily agreed to sell. Through this purchase, Charles acquired a claim to the city of Ferrette, near the Swiss border, which alarmed the Swiss Confederacy. His rights and income from the new territories were limited because most of the land rights were mortgaged to local nobles. Charles's deputy in the region, Peter von Hagenbach, imposed harsh taxes on the local population. Several towns in Alsace soon formed a league against Hagenbach. For the most part, Charles paid little attention to the region.

=== Meeting the Emperor at Trier ===
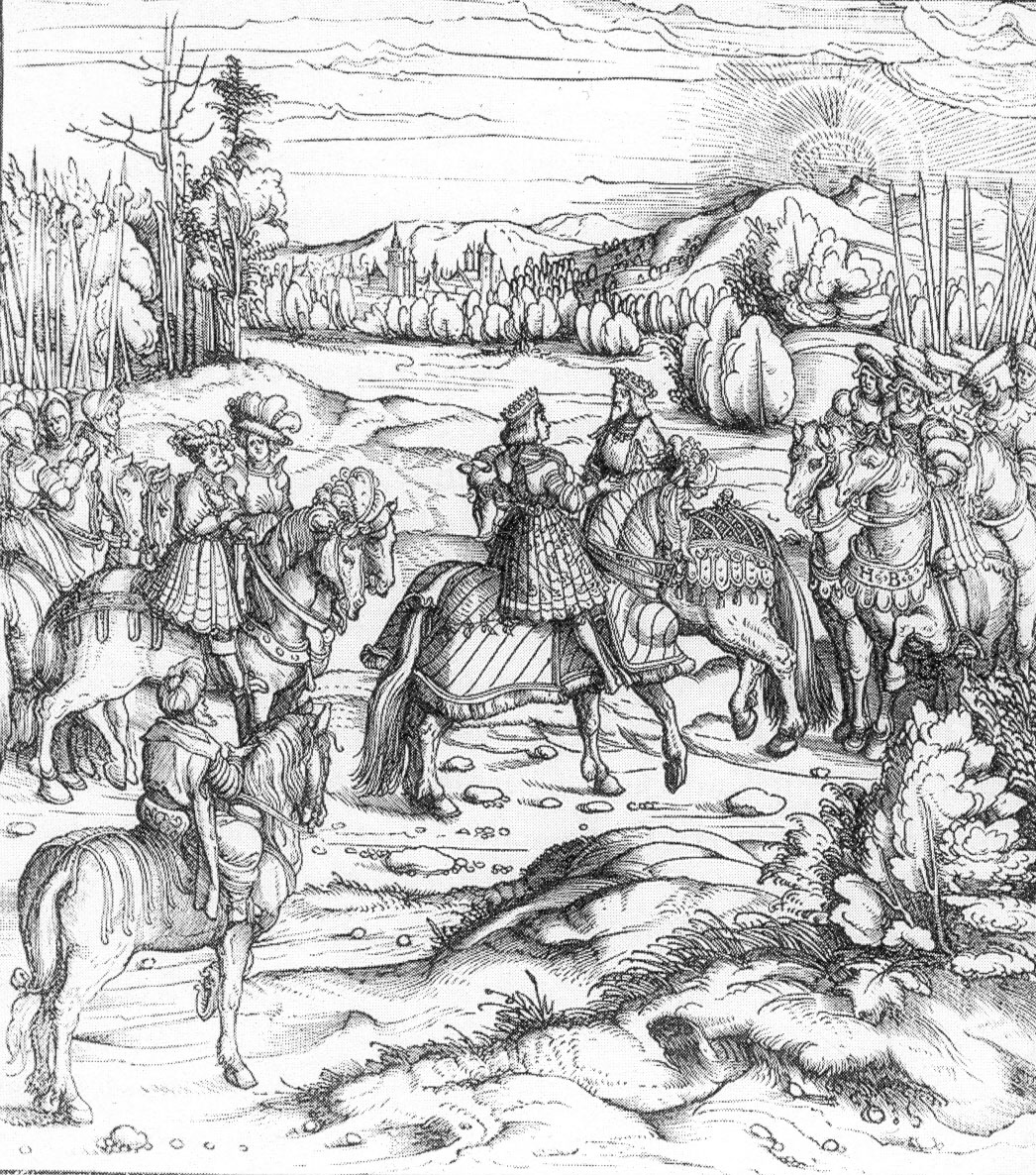
Meeting of Charles the Bold and Frederick III in Trier, 1473

Charles greatly desired to transform the Duchy of Burgundy into a kingdom, both to free it from vassalage to the French crown and to enhance his own stature. The only way to achieve this was within the framework of the Holy Roman Empire. At Charles's request, Sigismund of Austria proposed him as the next king of the Romans, the title borne by the emperor's designated successor. As an inducement, he also proposed the marriage of the Emperor's son to Charles's daughter. Charles was one of the richest princes in Europe. He was allied with the rebellious princes in the Empire, as well as the Hungarians, and the Bohemians. This made him an attractive ally for Frederick III, the Holy Roman Emperor.

In October 1473, both Charles and Frederick arrived at Trier. The Emperor came with his son Maximilian and 2,500 horsemen, while the Burgundian entourage included 13,000 men-at-arms, Burgundian nobility, bishops, and a display of treasures and relics. (Note: This encounter highlighted the economic and cultural differences between Christendom's richer west and poorer east, with the Germans amazed by the wealth of Burgundy and the Burgundians struck by the poor equipment of the Germans.) Despite all the grandeur, Frederick III was disappointed that Charles had not brought his daughter Mary, amid rumours spread by Habsburg opponents that she was physically defective.

Charles hoped to become the king of the Romans and eventually succeed Frederick as emperor. In return, Maximilian would inherit the Burgundian State and later succeed to the imperial throne. (Note: Maximilian's eventual succession reinforced the continuity of the emperorship in the Habsburg dynasty, which appealed to Frederick III's attachment to his house.) Charles also wanted to become a prince-elector, taking the Bohemian seat in the Electoral College, and to be recognised as the duke of Guelders.

He was still not recognised as king of the Romans, in part because Frederick III believed that the prince-electors would not vote for him. During the conference, Charles ignored and alienated the prince-electors. When he realised how much he needed their support, he tried to impress them with displays of his wealth, but they were not swayed. Charles largely neglected the prince-electors, a diplomatic misstep that Lecuppre-Desjardin attributes to his "very French political assumptions" and limited understanding of German elective practices.

As an alternative, Frederick III proposed elevating the Duchy of Burgundy to a kingdom, and Charles accepted. The two agreed that Frederick III would crown Charles in the Trier Cathedral on 25 November. However, the next day the Emperor secretly departed from Trier, embarking on the Moselle at dawn. Charles became enraged, locked himself in his room, and smashed the furniture to pieces. He did not, however, break the betrothal between Maximilian and Mary, still hoping to secure a royal crown.

=== Diplomacy ===
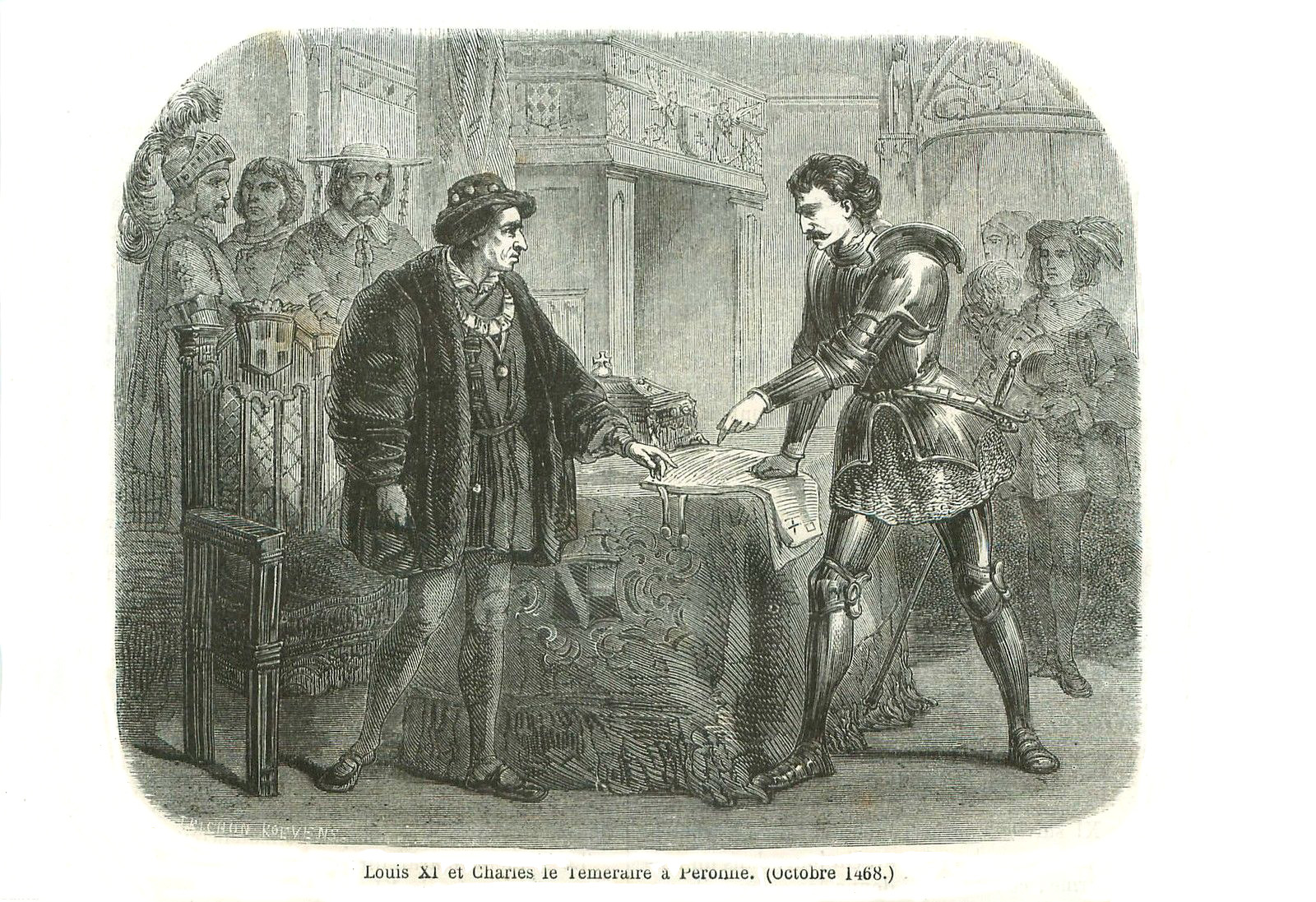
Charles the Bold ordering Louis XI to sign the Treaty of Péronne; 1913; Histoire de France et notions d'Histoire Générale by Gustave Hervé, illustrated by Valéry Müller

Charles pursued a risky and aggressive foreign policy. He sought as many allies as possible and regarded almost everyone, apart from Louis XI, as a potential ally. In 1471, he made a list of his nineteen allies. By the following year he counted twenty-four, and by 1473 he claimed twenty-six allies, compared with Louis XI's fifteen. Some of these relationships, however, were largely formal, such as those with Scotland. The kings of Scotland and Denmark also signed treaties with Louis XI and appeared on his own list of allies. After the death of his wife Isabella on 26 September 1465, Charles obtained an alliance with England through a marriage with Edward IV's sister, Margaret of York.

In 1473, through negotiations with the new Duke of Lorraine, René II, Charles secured the right to move his armies through Lorraine and place Burgundian captains in its important fortifications, effectively turning the duchy into a Burgundian protectorate. Furthermore, Charles expanded Burgundy's sphere of influence in Italy in order to rival that of France, which held a triple alliance with the Duchy of Milan, the Republic of Florence, and the Kingdom of Naples. This resulted in the signing of the Treaty of Moncalieri in 1475, in which Charles replaced Louis XI as the dominant influence in Italian politics, with three of four major secular powers in the region—Milan, Naples, and Venice—aligned with him.

Charles's relations with the Republic of Venice rested on his professed willingness to launch a crusade against the Ottomans and throughout his reign, Charles faced repeated requests to commit men to a crusade against the Ottoman Empire. Pope Sixtus IV sent three instructions to the papal legate at the Burgundian court, Lucas de Tollentis, directing him to encourage Charles to undertake a crusade against the Ottomans and the Venetians repeatedly urged Charles to fulfil his part of the bargain and support Venice in its war with the Ottomans. Only briefly, between late 1475 and early 1476, did Charles seriously consider a crusade. This followed a meeting with Andreas Palaiologos, the deposed Despot of the Morea, who agreed to cede to Charles his claim as the Emperor of Trebizond and Constantinople. (Note: Andreas inherited the claims to the Byzantine and Trebizond empires after the deaths of the principal claimants from the Palaiologos and Komnenos dynasties, respectively.) However, Charles' inaction gradually led to estrangement between Burgundy and Venice.

The intense rivalry between Louis XI and Charles kept both rulers prepared for war. In 1468, Charles and Louis attempted a reconciliation, which astonished the rest of France. Their peace talks quickly turned to hostility when Charles learned that Louis had been involved in a recent rebellion in Liège. Charles then detained Louis at Péronne and compelled him to sign a treaty favourable to Burgundy. Its terms released the Duke of Burgundy from the obligation of paying homage, recognised Charles's sovereignty over Picardy, and ended French jurisdiction over Burgundian subjects. Louis reluctantly agreed and signed the Treaty of Péronne. The French crown, however, did not abide by its terms, and Franco-Burgundian relations remained poor.

The suspicious death of Charles of Valois, Duke of Berry, the king's brother, in 1472 prompted Charles to raise arms in revenge for the death of his ally, claiming that Berry had been poisoned by Louis. After a short conflict, the two ceased fighting in the winter of 1473 without making peace. Neither ruler formally declared war on the other again during the rest of their reigns.

=== Patron of arts ===
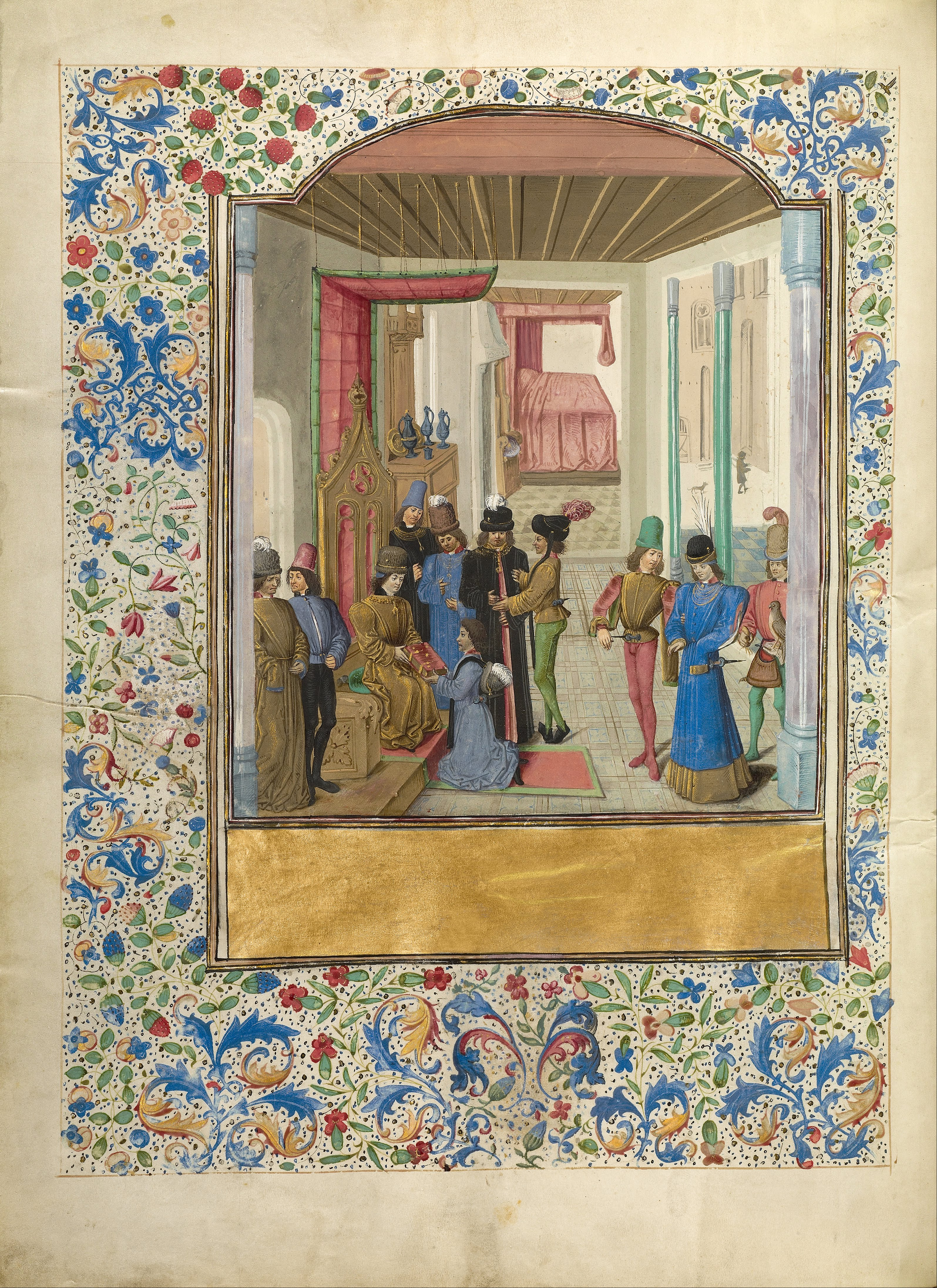
Vasco de Lucena presenting his translation of Quintus Curtius Rufus's Histories of Alexander the Great to Charles the Bold. Folio from Le Jardin de vertueuse consolation by an anonymous master, between 1470 and 1475.

The Burgundian court under Charles was famous for its splendour, etiquette, and chivalric culture. It attracted many young noblemen and princes from across Europe who came to learn courtly manners and the arts. Later generations admired Charles's court. At the urging of his father, Charles V, Philip II introduced the "ceremonial of the court of Burgundy" into Spain, drawing on Olivier de la Marche's account of Charles's court. In this way, Burgundian court ceremony influenced courtly life in 17th century Spain.

Although Charles's court did not differ greatly from those of his contemporaries, its appeal was strengthened by the number of knights and nobles present, the sacred image of a ruler set apart from other courtiers, and the splendour of court display. Like his predecessors, Charles used lavish patronage of the arts to project power and magnificence.

During Charles's reign, the production of illuminated manuscripts flourished. After his accession in 1467, he provided considerable funds for projects left incomplete after his father's death and commissioned new works. As a patron of Renaissance humanism, Charles commissioned the translation of Quintus Curtius Rufus's Histories of Alexander the Great into French to replace the inadequate Roman d'Alexandre en prose. He also employed the Portuguese Vasco de Lucena and Jehan de Chesne to translate Xenophon's Cyropaedia and Caesar's De bello Gallico, respectively, into French. In 1468, he commissioned Guillaume Fillastre to compose the Histoire de Toison d'Or, a didactic chronicle containing moral stories of Jason, Jacob, Gideon, Mesha, Job, and David.

Charles also employed skilled calligraphers and illuminators to engross his ordinances. The Ordinance of 1469 was illuminated by Nicolas Spierinc and distributed among Charles's courtiers. His prayer book, illuminated by Lieven van Lathem, has been described as a masterpiece of Flemish illumination that influenced later illuminators such as the Master of Mary of Burgundy. Charles and his wife Margaret were patrons of Simon Marmion, who illuminated a breviary and a panel painting for them.

Charles was a patron of music and was a capable musician. In his 1469 ordinance, he set out the composition of his musical entourage: a concert band, ceremonial trumpeters, chamber musicians, an organist, and the chapel musicians, whose music was more varied than that of Philip the Good's chapel. He took his chapel with him on campaigns and had choristers sing a new song to him each night in his chambers. Charles was a patron of the composer Antoine Busnois, who became his choirmaster; his court musicians also included Hayne van Ghizeghem and Robert Morton. His favourite song was L'homme armé, which may have been written for him.

Charles composed a motet that was sung in the Cambrai Cathedral, possibly in the presence of Guillaume Du Fay, one of the best-known composers of his era. He also composed chansons and secular songs. Although none of his motet or chansons survive, two songs are attributed to him: Del ducha di borghogna (of the Duke of Burgundy) and Dux Carlus (Duke Charles). Both survive in Italian songbooks without named composers. According to the musicologist David Fallows, their similarities in voice ranges, use of the pitch C, musical form (rondeau), and opening phrase Ma dame suggest that both were probably composed by Charles in the 1460s. Charles also liked to sing, although he did not have a good singing voice.

=== Military ===
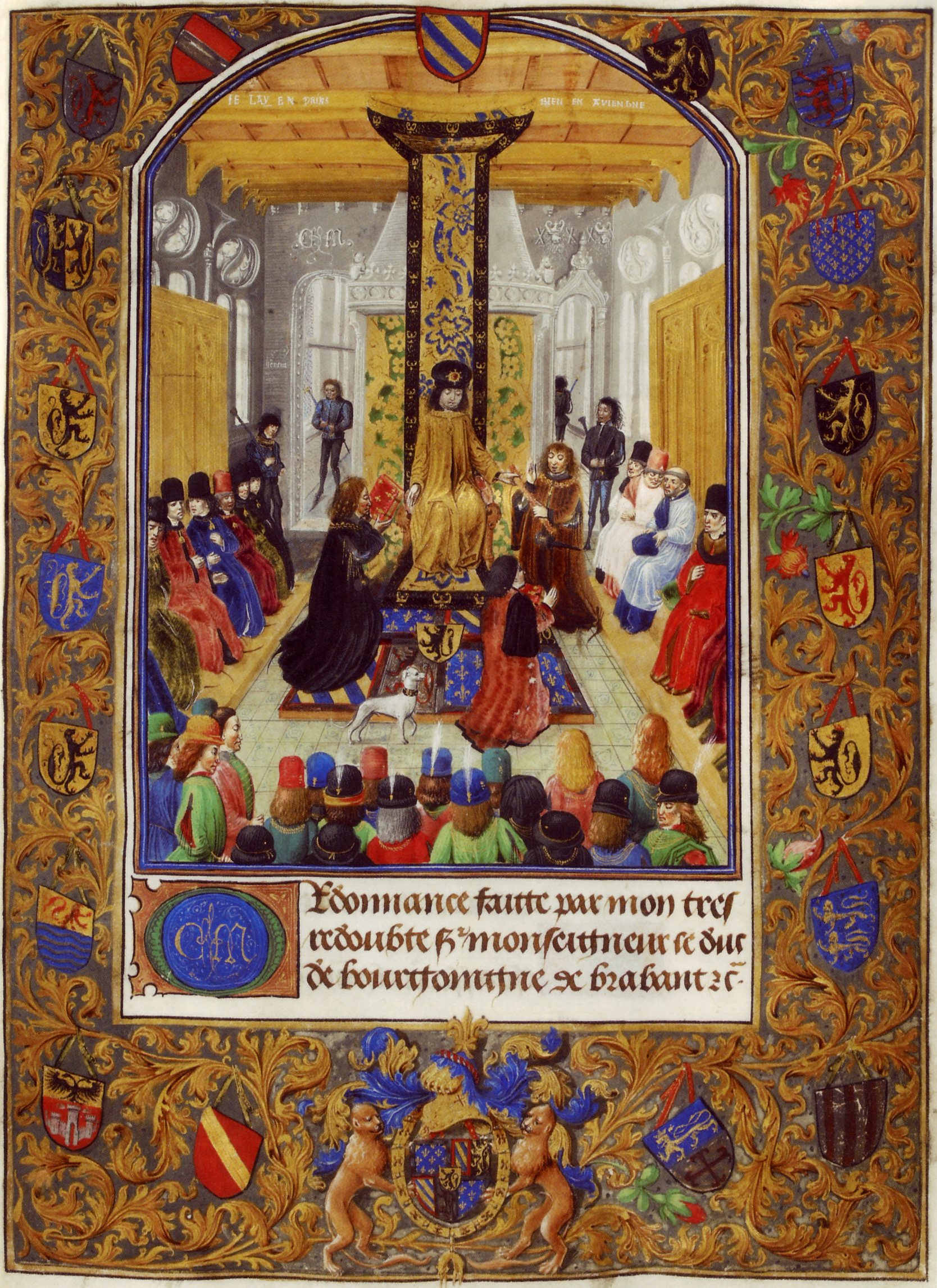
Military Ordinance of Charles the Bold, Master of Fitzwilliam 268, c. 1475

When Charles became the Duke of Burgundy, his army still operated under a feudal system, with most men either summoned for service or hired under contract. Much of the army consisted of French nobles, their retainers, and English archers, and it suffered from inefficient distribution of resources and slow movement. After the long period of peace under Philip the Good, the army had trained little and was poorly prepared. Its structure was also outdated compared with other European armies. To address these problems, Charles issued a series of military ordinances between 1468 and 1473 that reorganised the Burgundian army and later influenced European military practice.

The first of these ordinances, addressed to the Marshal of Burgundy, set out who could be recruited and described the personnel of the artillery, including masons, assistants, cannoneers, and carpenters. The second ordinance, issued at Abbeville in 1471, proclaimed the formation of a standing army, called Compagnie d'ordonnance, made up of 1,250 lances fournies, accompanied by 1,200 crossbows, 1,250 handgunners, and 1,250 pikemen. A squad consisted of a man-at-arms, a mounted page, a mounted swordsman, three horse archers, a crossbowman, and a pikeman. Charles designed a uniform for each company, using the Cross of Burgundy inscribed on the ducal colours.

Military flag of the Burgundian State during the Battle of Grandson

The last of these ordinances, issued at Thionville, marked the culmination of Charles's military administration. It regulated the organisation of squads in detail, prescribed battle marches to maintain order, specified soldiers' equipment, and placed great emphasis on discipline. Charles forbade individual soldiers from keeping camp followers, but permitted each company of 900 to have 30 women who would attend to them. He imposed harsh rules against defaulters and deserters. In 1476, he appointed Jehan de Dadizele to arrest deserters; those who encouraged desertion were to be executed, while deserters themselves were to be returned to the army. Charles intended his soldiers to explain the new rules to their comrades in private settings, without a disciplinarian present. His erratic pace in issuing detailed reforms every few years made them difficult for captains and men-at-arms to implement.

The Burgundian standing army struggled with recruitment. Although it had enough men-at-arms, pikemen, and mounted archers, it lacked culverins and foot archers. To address this, Charles broadened recruitment and drew soldiers from other nationalities. Italian mercenaries became especially important and by 1476 formed a large part of his army. Although earlier military writers had warned against relying on mercenaries, the contemporary chronicler Jean Molinet praised Charles's policy, saying that he was favoured by both heaven and earth and therefore stood above the "commandments of philosophers".

== Burgundian Wars ==
=== Prelude ===
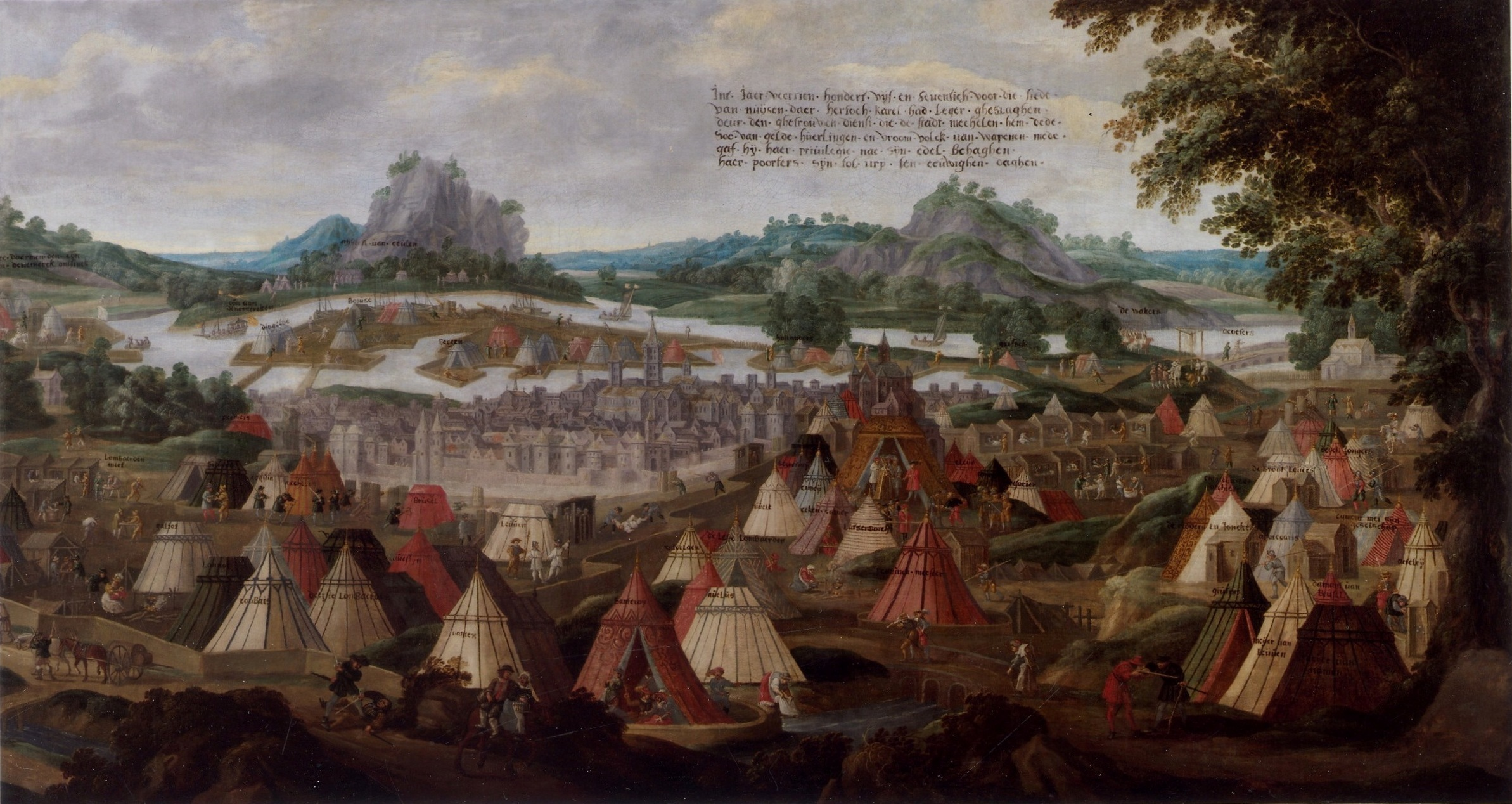
Siege of Neuss by Charles the Bold in 1475, by Adriaen Van den Houte

Continuing his territorial expansion, Charles turned his attention to the Rhineland, where the Archbishop of Cologne, Ruprecht, had asked for his aid against a rebellion. Hoping to turn the archbishopric into a Burgundian protectorate, he planned to lay siege to Colognian cities and force the subjects to accept Ruprecht's terms. His first target was Neuss, which he needed to control in order to guarantee Burgundian supply lines for an attack on Cologne. Neuss was expected to fall within a few days, and many contemporary historians feared that its fall would open up Germany to the Burgundians. The Siege of Neuss, however, lasted from July 1474 to June 1475 and cost Burgundy heavily in army strength and strategic opportunities. (Note: Charles was constantly petitioned by his brother-in-law, Edward IV of England, to leave the siege and join Edward in fighting the French. But in the face of the Emperor's forces, Charles did not want to withdraw and lose face. Eventually, Edward, after seeing no support from his ally, agreed to sign the Treaty of Picquigny with Louis XI; the terms of the treaty included a seven-year truce and a marriage alliance between the two kingdoms.) The inhabitants of Neuss endured heavy bombardment and the exhaustion of their food supplies, as they waited for relief from Emperor Frederick.

Emperor Frederick was slow to assemble an army. After gathering 20,000 German forces in spring 1475, he took seventeen days to march from Cologne to Zons, where his army encamped. The emperor had no desire to fight the Burgundians and limited his involvement to a few skirmishes. The conflict quickly ended after a papal emissary threatened both sides with excommunication, and all parties signed a peace treaty on 29 May 1475.

In response to Charles's aggressive policies, the Imperial city of Strasbourg, the Rhineland cities of Colmar and Sélestat, and Swiss cantons of Basel and Bern formed the League of Constance to drive Burgundy out of Alsace. In April 1474, rebellion broke out in Alsace, and the league declared war on Burgundy in support of the rebels. The league overthrew Hagenbach, Charles's deputy in Alsace, put him on trial, and executed him on 9 May. Charles was enraged by the news, but could not act immediately because he was still preoccupied with the Siege of Neuss. In August, he sent an army led by Hagenbach's brother, Stefan von Hagenbach, into Alsace, where it plundered the region. This expedition has been considered a catalyst for the Burgundian Wars between Charles and the League of Constance, which by 1475 also included René II of Lorraine.

=== Battle of Grandson ===
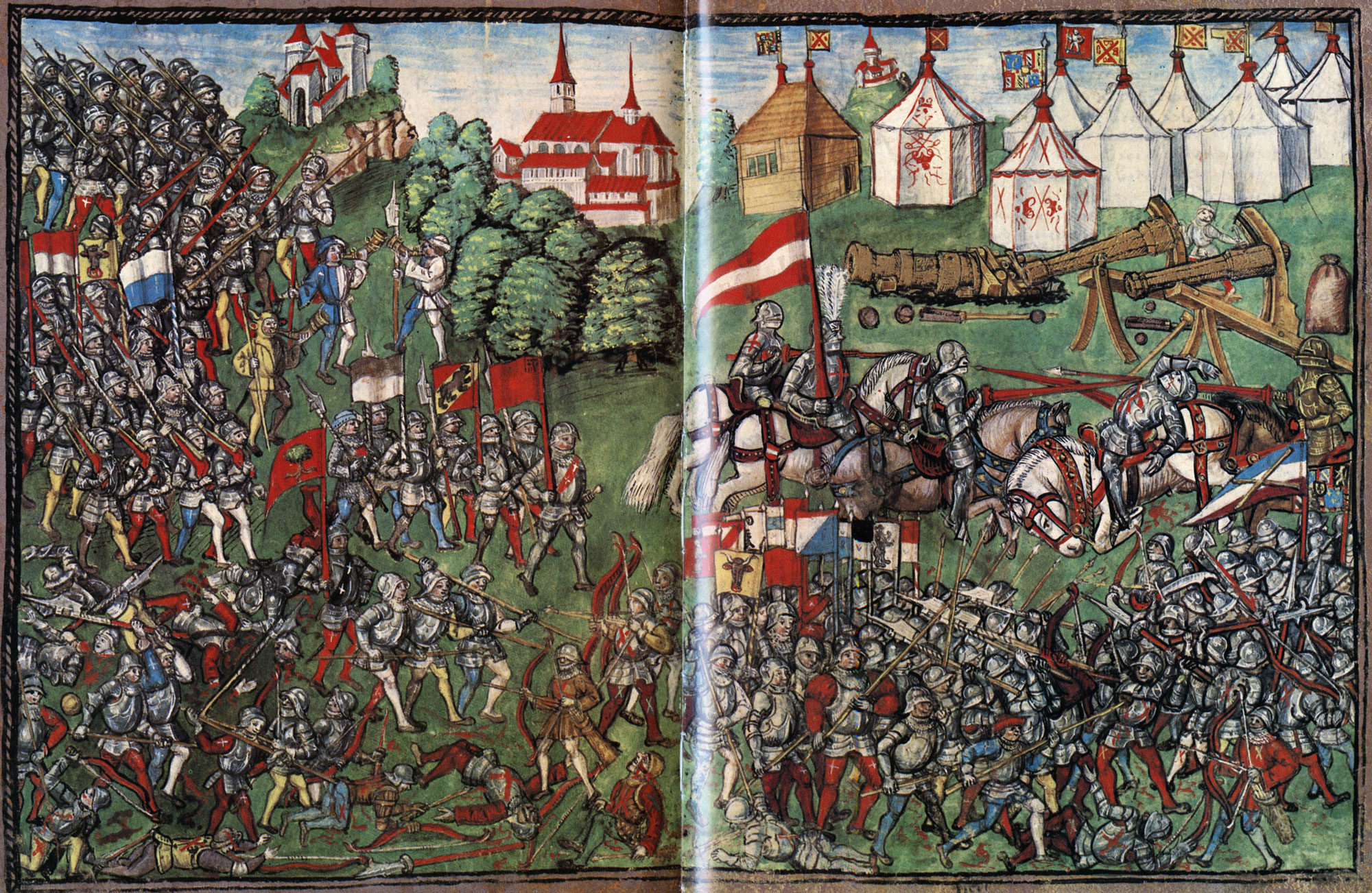
Battle of Grandson, miniature of 1515 by Diebold Schilling the Younger in the Lucerne chronicle

Charles then invaded the Swiss and their allies. Splitting his army into two, he advanced through Lorraine without resistance and captured Nancy. At the beginning of 1476, he besieged the castle of Grandson, which was held by a garrison from Bern. After recapturing the castle, Charles executed the entire Bernese garrison in retaliation for Swiss brutality in Burgundian towns. On 1 March, expecting the Swiss army to advance against him, Charles left Grandson and moved north towards Concise. The Swiss army marched from Neuchâtel, with its vanguard reaching the mountain pass first and surprising the Burgundian army.

Charles quickly rallied his troops, ordered his artillery to fire on the Swiss lines, and launched an attack. Meanwhile, the Swiss had knelt down to pray, which the Burgundians may have mistaken for submission, encouraging the attack. The initial charge, commanded by Louis de Châlon-Arlay, Lord of Grandson, failed to break the Swiss defensive line, and Louis was killed. Charles then launched a second attack, but soon withdrew, hoping to draw the Swiss further down the valley to give his artillery a better target.

The rest of Charles's army mistook his tactical retreat for a full withdrawal. As the main Swiss force reached the valley, sounding their horns, the Burgundians panicked and abandoned their positions despite Charles's attempts to keep them in order. They also abandoned their camp at Grandson, leaving it for the Swiss to capture. The Battle of Grandson ended in a defeat for Charles: he lost many valuable treasures, along with his artillery and supplies. For two or three days after the battle, Charles refused any food or drink. By 4 March, he began reorganising his army in the hope of fighting again within two weeks.

=== Battle of Morat ===
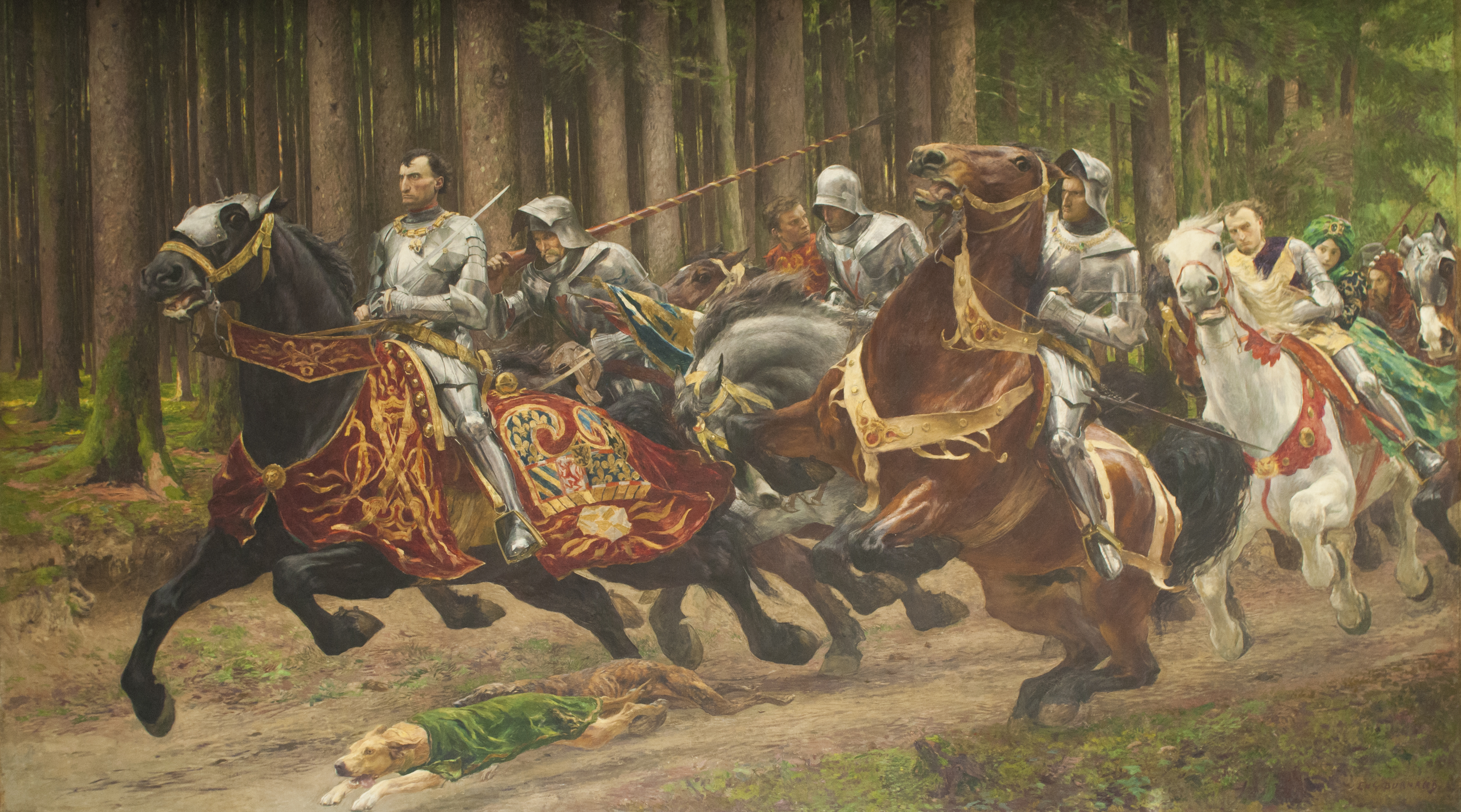
The flight of Charles the Bold after the Battle of Morat by Eugène Burnand, 1894, now in the Eugène Burnand Museum, Moudon

Charles retreated to Lausanne, where he reorganised his army. He demanded more artillery and men-at-arms from his lands: in Dijon, metal objects were melted down to make cannon, and in occupied Lorraine he confiscated all the artillery. (Note: Philippe de Commines, the Burgundian chronicler, reported that in an official decree to all his realm, Charles ordered "Der Meyer zu Lockie an den Grafen zu Aarburg" (all the world to come to him with all (its) cannon and all (its) manpower).) He received funds from all his allies, and men from Italy, Germany, England, and Poland joined his army. By the end of May, he had assembled 20,000 men in Lausanne, outnumbering the local population. He trained them from 14 to 26 May, while his own health worsened. Delayed supply lines and overdue pay forced the army to cut costs, and many horse archers had to go on foot. Although impressive in appearance, the army lacked cohesion and was unstable.

On 27 May, Charles and his army began marching towards the fortress of Morat. His main objective was Bern, but he first needed to capture Morat in order to isolate the city. He arrived at Morat on 9 June and immediately besieged the fortress. By 19 June, after several assaults and the destruction of parts of its walls, Morat sent a message to Bern asking for help.

On 20 June, the Eidgenossen (oath companion (Note: The word Eidgenossen literally translated as 'oath companion', and was a synonym for the Swiss, referring to the members of the Old Swiss Confederacy. Until the Siege of Morat, most of the confederacy had not declared war on Burgundy, because Charles had yet to invade a territory officially part of one of its members. But during the siege, Charles attacked a bridge which was a part of Bernese territory, thus obligating the confederacy to join Bern in their campaign against Burgundy.)) arrived at Morat. The forces were larger than the army at Grandson: Swiss commanders estimated them at 30,000 men, while recent historians place the figure at 24,000. Charles expected a decisive battle on 21 June, but no attack came. The Swiss attacked instead on 22 June, a holy day associated with the Ten thousand martyrs, and caught the Burgundians by surprise. Charles was slow to organise a counterattack; before his men had finished taking position, the Swiss army had already reached them. The Burgundian army soon abandoned its posts and fled.

The battle ended in a victory for the Swiss, followed by intense slaughter of the fleeing Burgundian army. Many men drowned while retreating into Lake Morat, while others were shot with arquebuses and hand cannons after climbing walnut trees. The Swiss showed no mercy to men who surrendered, killing knights, soldiers, and high officials alike. Charles fled with his men and rode for days until he reached Gex, Ain. The Milanese ambassador, Panigarola, reported that Charles laughed and joked after the defeat. He refused to believe he had been beaten and continued to think God was on his side.

== Death ==
=== Battle of Nancy ===
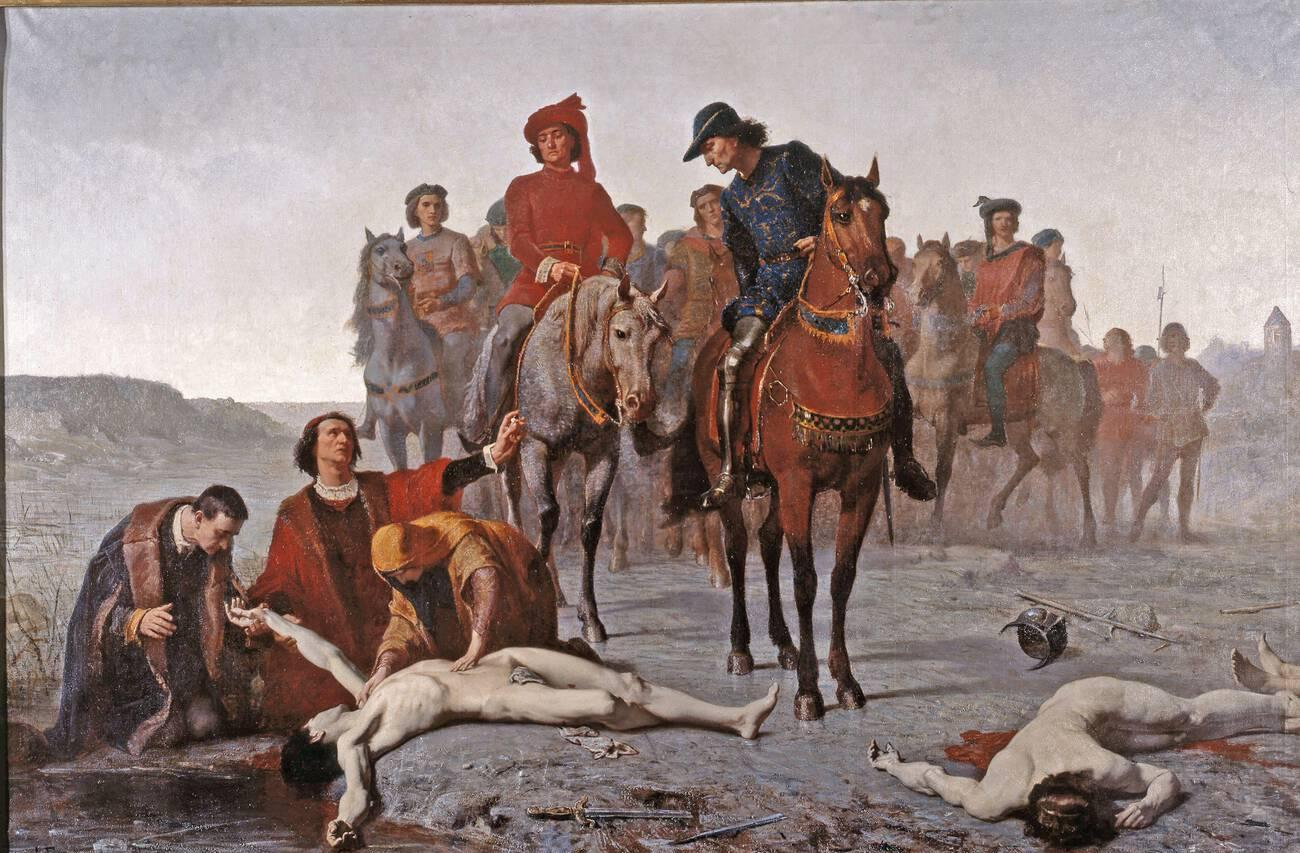
Charles's corpse found after the Battle of Nancy, Auguste Feyen-Perrin, 1865, Musée des Beaux-Arts, Nancy

While Charles may have wanted to continue the war against the Swiss, his plans changed when Nancy was reconquered by René II on 6 October. In need of money, Charles took a large loan from the Medici bank, which he used to hastily assemble 10,000 men. The rest of his army consisted of the Italian mercenaries under the command of the Count of Campobasso, the Burgundian garrison in Nancy, and 8,000 reinforcements from the Netherlands. Charles arrived before Nancy on 11 October and by 22 October had begun bombarding the city walls. The siege continued throughout the harsh winter. Charles hoped to enter the city before René's allies came to raise the siege.

René spent November and December negotiating with the Swiss to hire mercenaries and with Louis XI to pay the Swiss. He succeeded in both efforts and marched from Basel towards Nancy on 26 December with 9,000 Swiss mercenaries. Between 31 December and 3 January 1477, the Count of Campobasso and his Italian mercenaries deserted the Burgundians. They joined René and fought against Charles in the coming battle. (Note: It is not clear what Campobasso's position was during the battle. One Neapolitan account reports that Charles found himself engaged in a duel with Campobasso. According to Angelo de Tummulillis, Charles had Campobasso at his mercy but spared him and told him to flee.)

On 5 January, in thick snow, René and his army marched towards the Burgundian position. The snow obscured their movements, allowing them to attack the Burgundian front, where Charles had not placed pickets. Around noon, the Burgundian artillery was too slow to engage the rapidly approaching army. Charles tried to rally his men, but the Burgundians were already fleeing from the battlefield. Alsatian and Swiss infantry encircled Charles and his horsemen. Charles fell from his horse in the River Meurthe and was struck on his head with a halberd, which pierced his helmet and skull. Half of the Burgundian army died during the battle or while retreating. Only those who escaped the 50 km (31 mi) to Metz survived.

=== Burial ===
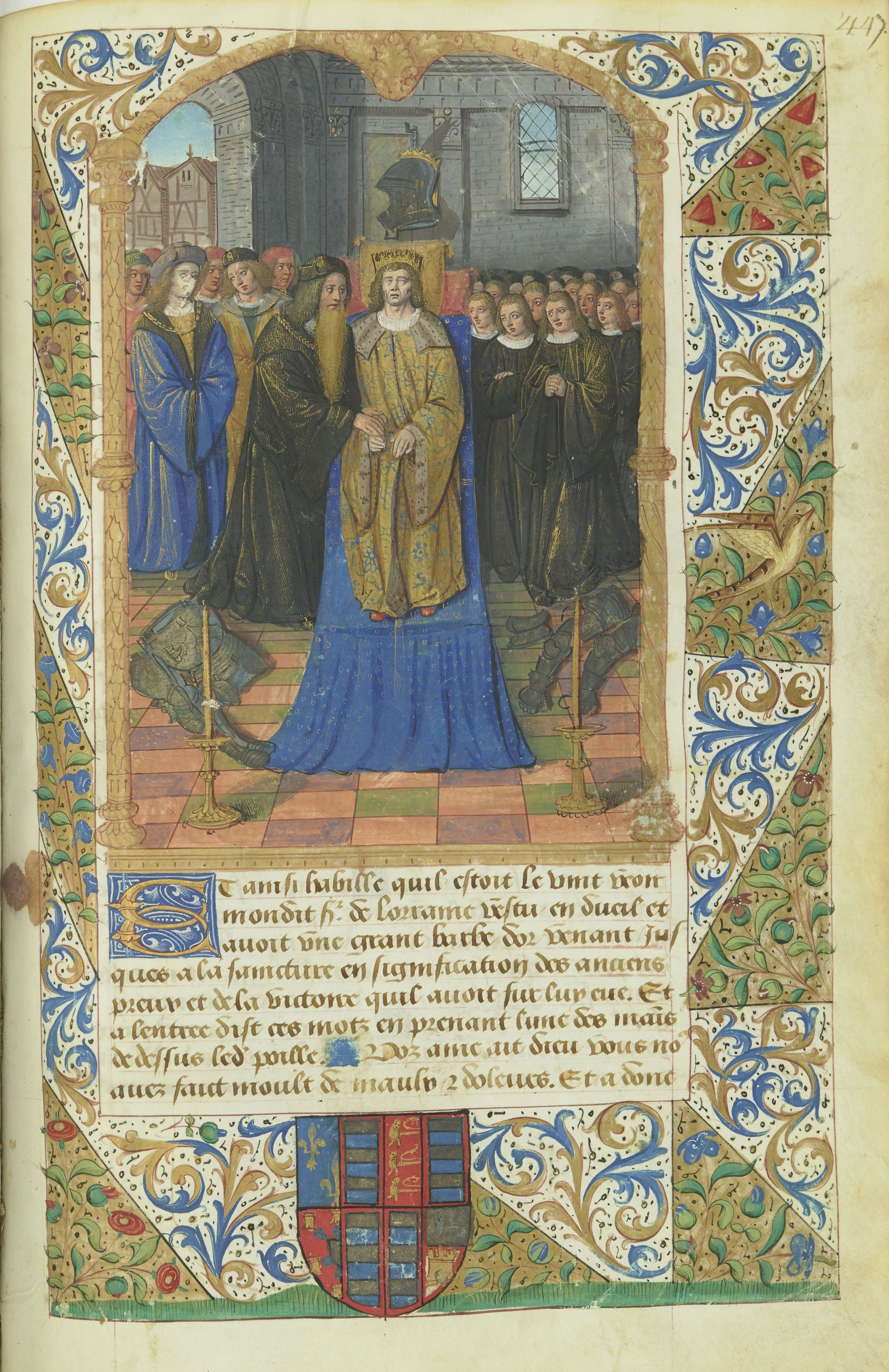
Duke René II of Lorraine holding the hands of the corpse of Charles the Bold, Chronique scandaleuse by Jean de Roye

The corpse of Charles the Bold was found two days after the battle, lying on the ice-bound river, with half of his head frozen. It was identified by a group that included Charles's Roman valet, his Portuguese personal physician, his chaplain, Olivier de la Marche, and two of his bastard brothers. They recognised it by a missing tooth, an ingrown toenail, and long fingernails. His body was moved to Nancy with full honours, where it was displayed for five days. René buried him in the Saint-George collegiate church of Nancy. In Artois, people refused to believe he was dead, believing instead that he had escaped to Germany to undergo seven years of penance and would reappear.

Margaret of York, Charles's widow, asked for his body to be returned, but René refused. More than 70 years after Charles's death, on 22 September 1550, Emperor Charles V had the body exhumed and brought to Luxembourg to strengthen his claim to Burgundy. Three years later, Charles's bones were again exhumed and transferred to their final resting place in the Church of Our Lady, Bruges, beside his daughter, Mary of Burgundy. In 1559, King Philip II of Spain ordered the construction of a monument over Charles's tomb, which was completed in 1563. Philip held masses for the repose of Charles's soul and commemorated the date of his death on 5 January.

=== Aftermath ===
Burgundian territories (orange/yellow) and limits of France (red) after the Burgundian Wars.

Louis XI learned of Charles's death before the news reached Burgundy and took advantage of the lack of leadership. Three weeks after the Battle of Nancy, he invaded Burgundian territory through Picardy, Artois, and Mâcon. Ghent rose in rebellion and executed two of Charles's closest collaborators, William Hugonet and Guy of Brimeu. Charles's former conquests, Liège and Guelders, quickly sought independence, while in Luxembourg a struggle broke out about whether to recognise Mary as Charles's successor. Sigismund of Austria and the Swiss vied for Franche-Comté, while Holland, Zeeland, Frisia, and Hainault were claimed by the Count Palatine and the Duke of Bavaria.

Mary, Charles's only child, and Margaret, his widow, faced a political crisis. To secure her position as ruler, Mary signed the Great Privilege on 11 February 1477, restoring powers to the States General in Flanders, Brabant, Hainaut, and Holland. To secure an alliance with the Habsburgs, she married Maximilian, son of Holy Roman Emperor Frederick III, in August 1477. Maximilian used diplomacy and military force to defend and regain territories from Louis XI, though France retained the geographic Duchy of Burgundy. He also suppressed several internal revolts, preserving much of the Burgundian State. Mary died on 27 March 1482, and her lands and the title of Duke of Burgundy passed to her son and heir, Philip.

== Historiography and legacy ==
Charles's death led to the collapse of the Burgundian State. He had no legitimate male heir, and he had not secured a capable husband for his daughter whom he could prepare for succession. He was preoccupied with uniting the "lands over there" (Low Countries) and the "lands over here" (Burgundy proper) through Lorraine, and sought to forge a national identity independent from that of France. During his years as Duke of Burgundy, he sought a crown and a new kingdom that would unite his subjects and enhance his own glory. His efforts, however, inadvertently united his German enemies under the banner of a "German nation" opposed to him; they called Charles "The Grand Turk of the West".

Charles's death marks a significant moment in the modern history of Lorraine; in Nancy, René II's victory is still commemorated favourably. The Swiss victory at Morat became a marker of national identity, pride, and preservation of their independence. The Battle of Morat contributed to the decline of feudalism and heralded the end to the concept of chivalry. German-language historiography has treated Charles ambivalently, presenting him both as a tragic representative of the end of the Middle Ages and as an immoral, flawed prince. Until recently, Swiss literature generally portrayed him negatively.

Charles's death and the crisis of 1477 inspired works by Olivier de La Marche and Anthonis de Roovere. La Marche wrote Le chevalier délibéré, while De Roovere wrote Den droom van Rouere op die doot van hertoge Kaerle van Borgonnyen saleger gedachten. (Note: Translation: De Roovere's dream about the death of the late Charles of Burgundy.) The hostility between Charles the Bold and Louis XI later inspired 17th-century French moralistic dialogues by authors such as François Fénelon, whose Dialogues of the dead portrays Charles and Louis reconciling by drinking from the River Styx.

== Bibliography ==
=== Books ===
- Alden, Jane (2010). Songs, Scribes, and Society: The History and Reception of the Loire Valley Chansonniers. The New Cultural History of Music. New York: Oxford University Press. ISBN 978-0-19-970073-8. OCLC 953459041.
- Ainsworth, Maryan W. (1998). "The Business of Art : Patrons, Clients, and Art Markets". From Van Eyck to Bruegel: Early Netherlandish Painting in The Metropolitan Museum of Art. New York: Metropolitan Museum of Art. pp. 23–39. ISBN 978-0-87099-870-6. OCLC 39131019 – via H.N. Abrams.
- Bakos, Adrianna E. (2013). Images of Kingship in Early Modern France: Louis XI in Political Thought, 1560–1789. London: Routledge. ISBN 978-1-136-19190-9. OCLC 1463361960.
- Blockmans, Wim; Pervenier, Walter (1999). The Promised Lands: The Low Countries Under Burgundian Rule, 1369–1530. Philadelphia: University of Pennsylvania Press. ISBN 978-0-8122-3130-4. OCLC 40143018.
- Brady, Thomas A. (2009). German Histories in the Age of Reformations, 1400–1650. Cambridge: Cambridge University Press. ISBN 978-1-139-48115-1. OCLC 667034110.
- Brown, Howard Mayer (1999). "Music and Ritual at Charles the Bold's Court". In Higgins, Paula Marie (ed.). Antoine Busnoys: Method, Meaning, and Context in Late Medieval Music. Oxford: Oxford University Press. pp. 53–68. ISBN 978-0-19-816406-7. OCLC 883875759.
- Brown, Andrew (2010). Civic Ceremony and Religion in Medieval Bruges c. 1300–1520. Cambridge: Cambridge University Press. ISBN 978-1-139-49474-8. OCLC 1369788014.
- Cuttler, S.H. (1981). The Law of Treason and Treason Trials in Later Medieval France. Cambridge: Cambridge University Press. ISBN 978-0-521-23968-4. OCLC 7462091.
- Drake, Michael S. (2013) [First published 2002]. Problematics of Military Power: Government, Discipline and the Subject of Violence. Portland: Routledge. ISBN 978-0-415-86529-6. OCLC 827973166.
- Graves, Michael A.R (2014). The Parliaments of Early Modern Europe, 1400–1700. London: Taylor & Francis. ISBN 978-1-317-88433-0. OCLC 881417402.
- Gunn, S.J.; Janse, A. (2006). The Court as a Stage: England and the Low Countries in the Later Middle Ages. Woodbridge: Boydell. ISBN 978-1-84383-191-4. OCLC 62344765.
- Golubeva, Maria (2013). Models of Political Competence: The Evolution of Political Norms in the Works of Burgundian and Habsburg Court Historians, c. 1470–1700. Leiden: Brill. ISBN 978-90-04-25074-1. OCLC 846551779.
- Hooper, Nicholas; Bennett, Matthew (1996). The Cambridge Illustrated Atlas of Warfare: The Middle Ages, 768-1487. Cambridge: Cambridge University Press. ISBN 978-0-521-44049-3.
- Jenks, Stuart (2018). Documents on the Papal Plenary Indulgences 1300–1517 Preached in the Regnum Teutonicum. Leiden: Brill. ISBN 978-90-04-36063-1. OCLC 1043953147.
- Kendall, Paul Murray (1971). Louis XI: The Universal Spider. New York: W.W. Norton & Company Inc. ISBN 978-1-84212-411-6. OCLC 1012832822.
- Knecht, Robert (2007). The Valois: Kings of France 1328–1589. London: Bloomsbury Publishing. ISBN 978-1-85285-522-2. OCLC 460822682.
- Knechtges, David R. (2012). Rhetoric and the Discourses of Power in Court Culture: China, Europe, and Japan. Washington: University of Washington Press. ISBN 978-0-295-80236-7. OCLC 10019317967.
- Koenigsberger, H. G. (2001). Monarchies, States Generals, and Parliaments: The Netherlands in the Fifteenth and Sixteenth Centuries. Cambridge: Cambridge University Press. ISBN 978-0-521-80330-4. OCLC 46448960.
- Kren, Thomas; McKendrick, Scot (2003). Illuminating the Renaissance: The Triumph of Flemish Manuscript Painting in Europe. Los Angeles: The J. Paul Getty Museum. ISBN 978-0-89236-703-0. OCLC 51553612.
- Lecuppre-Desjardin, Élodie (2022). The illusion of the Burgundian state. Manchester Medieval Studies. Vol. 30. Manchester: Manchester University Press. ISBN 978-1-5261-7455-0. OCLC 10017268838.
- Nicholas, David (2014). Medieval Flanders. London: Taylor & Francis. ISBN 9781317901556. OCLC 869093661.
- Monter, E. William (2007). A Bewitched Duchy: Lorraine and Its Dukes, 1477–1736. Genève: Librairie Droz S.A. ISBN 978-2-600-01165-5. OCLC 182762213.
- Paravicini, Werner (2003). "Acquérir sa grâce pour le temps advenir. Les hommes de Charles le Téméraire, prince héritier (1433–1467)". In Kupper, Jean-Louis; Marchandisse, Alain (eds.). À l'ombre du Pouvoir: Les entourages princiers au Moyen Âge. Bibliothèque de la faculté de philosophie et lettres de l'université de Liège (in French). Liège: Presses universitaires de Liège. pp. 307–328. doi:10.4000/books.pulg.5562. ISBN 979-10-365-2063-1. OCLC 1191231576.
- Paravicini, Werner (2002). "Introduction to the 2002 Edition". Charles the Bold: The Last Valois Duke of Burgundy. Woodbridge: The Boydell Press. pp. xvii–xxxii. ISBN 978-0-85115-918-8. OCLC 973170828.
- Potter, Philip J. (2012). Monarchs of the Renaissance The Lives and Reigns of 42 European Kings and Queens. Jefferson, North Carolina: McFarland & Company. ISBN 978-0-7864-6806-5. OCLC 757461974.
- Putnam, Ruth (1908). Charles the Bold, last duke of Burgundy, 1433–1477. New York: G. P. Putnam's Sons. OCLC 458219774.
- Querengässer, Alexander (2021). Before the Military Revolution: European Warfare and the Rise of the Early Modern State 1300–1490. Havertown: Oxbow Books. doi:10.2307/j.ctv1rxdqnf. ISBN 978-1-78925-670-3. OCLC 1259593478.
- Schnerb, Bertrand (2008). "Burgundy". In Allmand, Christopher (ed.). The New Cambridge Medieval History. Cambridge: Cambridge University Press. pp. 431–456. doi:10.1017/CHOL9780521382960. ISBN 978-1-139-05575-8. OCLC 697957877.
- Schnitker, Harry (2004). "Margaret of York on Pilgrimage: The Exercise of Devotion and the Religious Traditions of the House of York". In Biggs, Doughlas; Michalove, Sharon; Reeves, Compton (eds.). Reputation and Representation in Fifteenth-Century Europe. Leiden: Brill. pp. 81–123. ISBN 978-90-04-13613-7. OCLC 191952657.
- Schryver, Antoine de (2008). The Prayer Book of Charles the Bold: A Study of a Flemish Masterpiece from the Burgundian Court. Los Angeles: Getty Publications. ISBN 978-0-89236-943-0. OCLC 216938539.
- Sieber-Lehmann, C. (1997). "Der türkische Sultan Mehmet II und Karl der Kühne, der "Türk im Occident"". In Erkens, F.R (ed.). Europa und die osmanische Expansion im ausgehenden Mittelalter. Berlin: Duncker & Humblot. pp. 13–39. ISBN 978-3-428-09180-5. OCLC 1146394225.
- Simpson, Gerry; Heller, Kevin (2013). The Hidden Histories of War Crimes Trials. Oxford: Oxford University Press. ISBN 978-0-19-967114-4. OCLC 5564735699.
- Smith, Robert Douglas; De Vries, Kelly (2005). The Artillery of the Dukes of Burgundy, 1363–1477. Rochester, New York: Boydell Press. ISBN 978-1-84383-162-4. OCLC 60322326.
- Stein, Robert (2017). Magnanimous Dukes and Rising States: The Unification of the Burgundian Netherlands, 1380–1480. Oxford: Oxford University Press. ISBN 978-0-19-107830-9. OCLC 973882565.
- Taruskin, Richard (2009). "Music for an intellectual and political elite". Oxford History of Western Music. Vol. 1. Oxford: Oxford University Press. ISBN 978-0-19-981369-8. OCLC 1181309726.
- Taylor, Aline (2002). Isabel of Burgundy: The Duchess who Played Politics in the Age of Joan of Arc. Stroud: Tempus. ISBN 978-0-7524-2315-9. OCLC 49044225.
- Van Loo, Bart (2021). The Burgundians: A Vanished Empire. London: Head of Zeus. ISBN 978-1-78954-343-8. OCLC 1264400332.
- Vaughan, Richard; Small, Graeme (2010). Philip the Good: The Apogee of Burgundy. Woodbridge: The Boydell Press. ISBN 978-0-85115-917-1. OCLC 1015575845.
- Vaughan, Richard (2002) [1973]. Charles the Bold: The Last Valois Duke of Burgundy. Woodbridge: The Boydell Press. ISBN 978-0-85115-918-8. OCLC 973170828.
- Villalon, L. J. Andrew; Kagay, Donald J. (2005). The Hundred Years War: A Wider Focus. Leiden: Brill. ISBN 978-90-47-40586-3. OCLC 274191996.
- Walsh, Richard J. (2005). Charles the Bold and Italy (1467–1477): Politics and Personnel. Liverpool Historical Studies. Vol. 19. Liverpool: Liverpool University Press. ISBN 978-1-84631-280-9. OCLC 269009493.
- Watson, Noelle; Schellinger, Paul; Ring, Trudy (2013). Northern Europe: International Dictionary of Historic Places. London: Taylor & Francis. ISBN 978-1-136-63944-9. OCLC 7385588780.

=== Articles ===
- Allmand, Christopher (2001). "Did the De re militari of Vegetius influence the military ordinances of Charles the Bold?". Publications du Centre Européen d'Études Bourguignonnes. 41. Brepols: 135–143. doi:10.1484/J.PCEEB.2.302198. ISSN 2034-6786.
- Beazley, Matthew (2014). "Burgundian blunder at Concise: The Battle of Grandson". Medieval Warfare. 4 (4). Karwansaray BV: 27–33. eISSN 2589-3548. ISSN 2211-5129. JSTOR 48578372.
- Brunner, Jean-Claude (2011). "Misery at Morat: Charles the Bold's English Archers at the Battle of Murten". Medieval Warfare. 1 (4). Karwansaray BV: 43–48. eISSN 2589-3548. ISSN 2211-5129. JSTOR 48577888.
- Boehm, Laetitia (1979). "Burgundy and the Empire in the Reign of Charles the Bold". The International History Review. 1 (2). Taylor & Francis, Ltd: 153–162. doi:10.1080/07075332.1979.9640180. ISSN 0707-5332. JSTOR 40105726.
- Dean, Sidney (2014). "Battle of Nancy: End game for Charles the Bold". Medieval Warfare. 4 (4). Karwansaray BV: 39–43. eISSN 2589-3548. ISSN 2211-5129. JSTOR 48578375.
- Fallows, David (2019). "Charles the Bold as a Patron, Singer and Composer". Tijdschrift van de Koninklijke Vereniging voor Nederlandse Muziekgeschiedenis. 69. Koninklijke Vereniging voor Nederlandse Muziekgeschiedenis (KVNM): 3–18. ISSN 1383-7079. JSTOR 45284494. OCLC 865210651.
- Haemers, Jelle (2011). "Social memory and rebellion in fifteenth-century Ghent". Social History. 36 (4). Taylor & Francis: 443–463. doi:10.1080/03071022.2011.610631. ISSN 0307-1022. JSTOR 23072657.
- Harris, Jonathan (1995). "A Worthless Prince? Andreas Palaeologus in Rome, 1465–1502". Orientalia Christiana Periodica. 61. Pontifical Oriental Institute: 537–554. ISSN 0030-5375.
- Jongenelen, Bas; Parsons, Ben (2016). "Anthonis de Roovere, 'De Roovere's dream about the death of the late Charles of Burgundy'". Journal of Low Countries Studies. 30 (2). Taylor & Francis: 306–318. doi:10.1080/03096564.2006.11730886. ISSN 0309-6564.
- Kiening, Christian (1994). "Rhétorique de la perte. L'exemple de la mort d'Isabelle de Bourbon (1465)". Médiévales (in French). 13 (27). Presses Universitaires de Vincennes: 15–24. doi:10.3406/medi.1994.1307. ISSN 0751-2708. JSTOR 43026850. OCLC 5792687718.
- Saenger, Paul (Spring 1977). "Burgundy and the Inalienability of Appanages in the Reign of Louis XI". French Historical Studies. 10 (1). Duke University Press: 1–26. doi:10.2307/286114. ISSN 0016-1071. JSTOR 286114.
- Salet, Francis (1982). "Le tombeau de Charles le Téméraire". Bulletin Monumental (in French). 140 (4). Société française d'archéologie: 343–344. ISSN 0007-473X. OCLC 866803890.
- Sommé, Monique (1982). "La jeunesse de Charles le Téméraire d'après les comptes de la cour de Bourgogne". Revue du Nord (in French). 64 (245–255). University – Lille III: 731–750. doi:10.3406/rnord.1982.3891. ISSN 0035-2624. OCLC 492984851.
- Van Rompaey, Jan (1979). "Du grand conseil de Philippe le Bon au parlement de malines de Charles le Téméraire". Revue du Nord (in French). 61 (240). University – Lille III: 213–214. ISSN 0035-2624. OCLC 492984851.
- Walsh, Richard J. (1977). "Charles the Bold and the crusade: politics and propaganda". Journal of Medieval History. 1 (3). Taylor & Francis: 53–86. doi:10.1016/0304-4181(77)90040-9. ISSN 0304-4181.
- Williams, Gareth (2014). "Fools Rush In: Charles the Bold and the Siege of Neuss". Medieval Warfare. 4 (4). Karwansaray BV: 22–26. eISSN 2589-3548. ISSN 2211-5129. JSTOR 48578371.
- Winkler, Albert (2010). "The Battle of Murten: The Invasion of Charles the Bold and the Survival of the Swiss States". Swiss American Historical Society Review. 46 (1). Birmingham University Press: 8–34. ISSN 2572-4479. OCLC 806785252.

=== Encyclopedias ===
- Ditcham, Brian G.H. (2010). "France, Narrative (1328–1483)". In Rogers, Cliford J. (ed.). The Oxford Encyclopedia of Medieval Warfare and Military Technology. New York: Oxford University Press. doi:10.1093/acref/9780195334036.001.0001. ISBN 9780195334036. OCLC 645185716.
- Hemelryck, Tania van (2016). "Fillastre, Guillaume". In Dunphy, Graeme; Bratu, Cristian (eds.). Encyclopedia of the Medieval Chronicle. Leiden: Brill. doi:10.1524/hzhz.2013.0033. ISBN 978-90-04-18464-0. ISSN 2666-5611. OCLC 864906597.
- Rogers, Clifford J., ed. (2010). The Oxford Encyclopedia of Medieval Warfare and Military Technology. New York: Oxford University Press. doi:10.1093/acref/9780195334036.001.0001. ISBN 978-0-19-533403-6. OCLC 645185716.
  - Baboukis, Johanna M. (2010a). "Montlhéry, Battle of". In Rogers (2010).
  - Baboukis, Johanna M. (2010b). "Charles the Bold". In Rogers (2010).
  - Baboukis, Johanna M. (2010c). "Grandson, Battle of". In Rogers (2010).
- Wright, Craig M. (2001). "Burgundy". Grove Music Online. Revised by David Fallows. Oxford: Oxford University Press. doi:10.1093/gmo/9781561592630.article.04366. ISBN 978-1-56159-263-0. (subscription, Wikilibrary access, or UK public library membership required)

Charles the Bold House of Valois-Burgundy Cadet branch of the House of Valois Born: 10 November 1433 Died: 5 January 1477
Regnal titles
Preceded by Philip the Good	Duke of Burgundy, Brabant, Limburg, Lothier and Luxemburg; Margrave of Namur; Count of Artois, Flanders, Hainaut, Holland and Zeeland; Count Palatine of Burgundy; 15 July 1467 – 5 January 1477	Succeeded by Mary
Preceded by Philip the Good	Count of Charolais; August 1433 – 5 January 1477	Succeeded by Mary
Preceded by Arnold	Duke of Guelders; Count of Zutphen; 23 February 1473 – 5 January 1477	Succeeded by Mary
