= War of the Public Weal =

1465 conflict in France

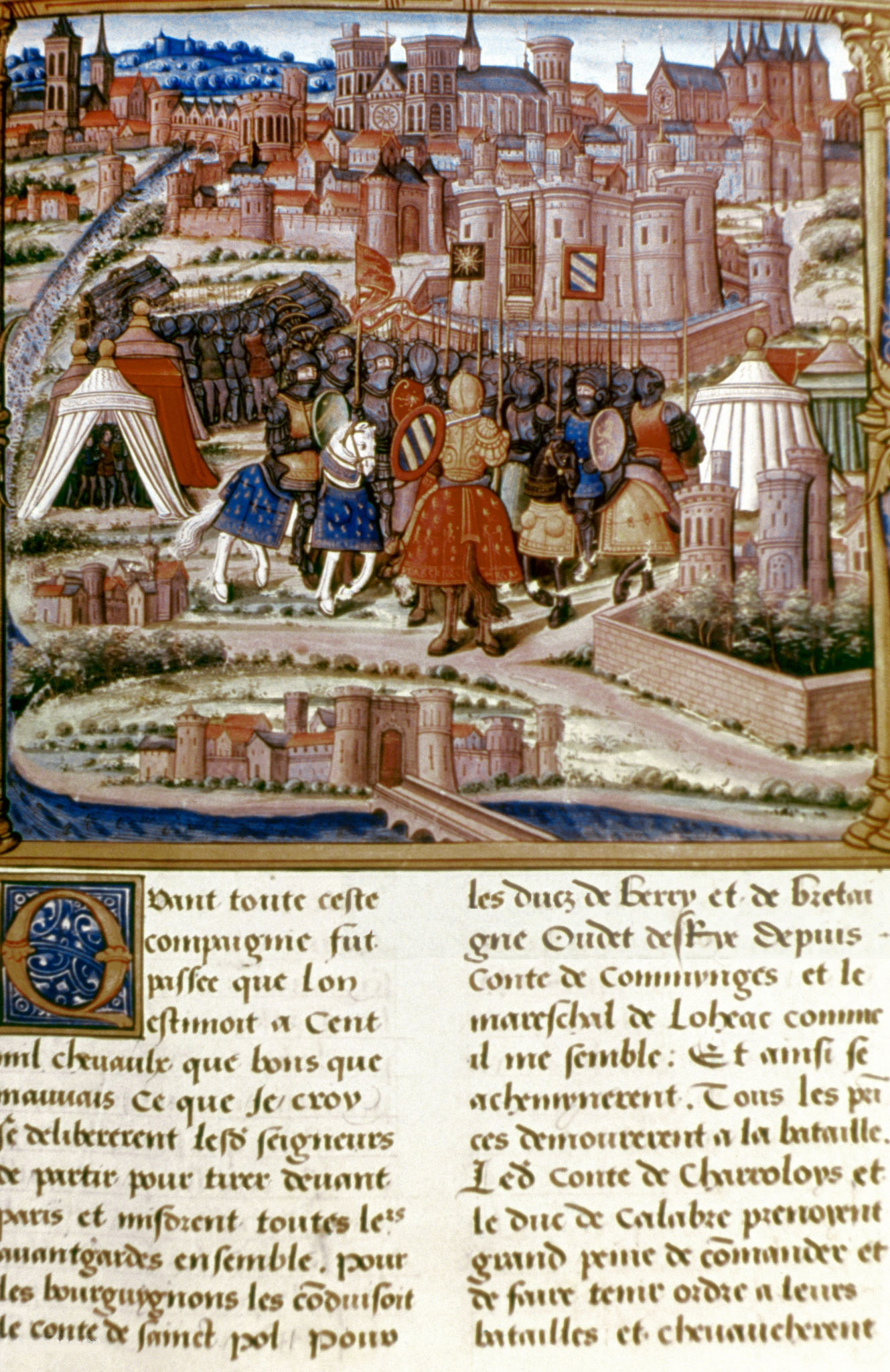
- Siege of Paris from the Mémoires de Commynes, musée Dobrée, 16th century
Date	March–October 1465
Location	France
Result	Treaty of Conflans, Treaty of Saint-Maur, and Treaty of Caen (1465)

Belligerents
Kingdom of France Loyal nobles: Duchy of Anjou; County of Maine; Count of Nevers; County of Vendôme; Counts of Eu; Supported by: Duchy of Milan; City of Liège	League of the Public Weal: Duchy of Berry; Duchy of Bourbon; Duchy of Brittany; Duchy of Lorraine; Duchy of Nemours; County of Armagnac; County of Saint-Pol; County of Dunois; County of Dammartin; County of Albret; Supported by: Duchy of Burgundy; Electoral Palatinate; Duchy of Cleves

Commanders and leaders
Louis XI; Gaston IV, Count of Foix; Francesco Sforza; René, Duke of Anjou; Charles of Anjou, Count of Maine; John of Burgundy, Count of Nevers; John of Bourbon, Count of Vendome; Charles of Artois, Count of Eu	Charles de France; John II, Duke of Bourbon; Charles of Burgundy; Francis II, Duke of Brittany; Jean de Calabre; Jacques d'Armagnac; John V, Count of Armagnac; Louis de Luxembourg; Jean de Dunois; Antoine de Chabannes; Charles II d'Albret; Pierre d'Amboise; John I, Duke of Cleves; André de Lohéac; Frederick I, Elector Palatine

Strength
30,000	51,000

The War of the Public Weal (French: La guerre du Bien public) was a conflict between the king of France and an alliance of feudal nobles, organized in 1465 in defiance of the centralized authority of King Louis XI of France. It was masterminded by Charles the Bold, Count of Charolais, son of the Duke of Burgundy, with the king's brother Charles, Duke of Berry, as a figurehead. The rebels succeeded in attaining concessions from the crown after several months of fighting, though conflict would break out again between the league and the crown in the Mad War of 1485 in a decisive victory for the crown.

== Background ==
In keeping with the policies of previous Capetian and Valois monarchs, Louis asserted the supremacy of the king within the territory of France. Over the course of the preceding centuries, and during the Hundred Years' War, the French kings had effected an administrative unification of the country. Unlike Germany, which languished as a miscellany of feudal factions, France emerged from the Middle Ages as a centralized state. But this centralization was opposed by the "League of the Public Weal" (Ligue du bien public), whose nobles sought to restore their feudal prerogatives.

Charles the Bold, as heir to the duke of Burgundy, whose fiefs in France included Flanders, and who held the Imperial lands of Holland and Brabant, sought to make the Duchy of Burgundy independent of the French throne. He aspired to forge it into a kingdom of his own between France and Germany, stretching between the North Sea on the north and the Jura Mountains on the south; and from the Somme River on the west to the Moselle River on the east. This kingdom would restore the ancient kingdom of Lotharingia—approximating the former domains of the Frankish Emperor Lothair I.

== War of the Public Weal ==
To defend himself against the alliance of rebellious nobles arrayed against him, Louis XI allied with Francesco Sforza, Duke of Milan, and the people of Liège.

Louis XI, who enjoyed the effective support of Gaston IV, Count of Foix, had an army of 30,000 men. At the beginning of hostilities in May and June 1465, he attacked the Bourbonnais center of the country. Then he began a race to the capital against the Breton and Burgundian armies. Before they joined forces, the king decided to confront the Burgundian army led by the Count of Charolais. The Battle of Montlhéry was fought on 16 July 1465 in the vicinity of Longpont-sur-Orge, south of Paris. The events of the battle are confused. Both parties claimed the victory. The Count of Charolais remained master of the field. But Louis XI reduced the Burgundian army, then cautiously ordered a strategic retreat during the night, and returned to Paris with a "victorious" army (although his uncle the Count of Maine had fled the battlefield with a third of the royal troops). The king strengthened the capital's faltering authority.

However, the king's position weakened after the confrontation, especially as he was unable to prevent the junction, on 19 July, of the Burgundian and Breton armies, soon joined by the Counts of Armagnac and Albret and the Duke of Lorraine.

After entering Paris on 18 July, Louis XI organized the defense. The feudal princes besieged Paris. Louis XI left the city on 10 August. He went to Rouen and rallied the royal party, assembled provisions, and returned to Paris on 28 August, with powerful reinforcements. A truce was signed on September 3, which did not prevent the Leaguers from taking Pontoise and Rouen. Fighters on both sides did not quite know how to end the conflict. Louis XI pretended to yield.

== Peace ==
Louis XI signed three peace treaties:

- 5 October 1465: Treaty of Conflans with the Count of Charolais and Charles of France
- 29 October 1465: Treaty of Saint-Maur with individual princes
- 23 December 1465: Treaty of Caen with the Duke Francis II of Brittany

=== Concessions ===
- Charles of France, Duke of Berry, received the Duchy of Normandy
- Charles of Burgundy, Count of Charolais received for himself and his next heir the Somme towns, after which they could be redeemed for 200,000 crowns (Louis XI had already redeemed these lands from Charles' father, the Duke of Burgundy, for 400,000 crowns), and estates at Boulogne, Guines, Roye, Peronne and Montdidier
- John of Anjou, Duke of Lorraine, the towns of Mouzon, St. Menehould and Neufchâteau
- Francis, Duke of Brittany, gained Montfort and Étampes, and the regale in all his demesnes
- John, Duke of Bourbon, gained Donchery, several lordships in Auvergne, 300 lances, and 100,000 crowns
- Jacques of Armagnac, Duke of Nemours, received the government of Paris and the Île-de-France
- John, Count of Armagnac, gained various castellanies at Rouergue
- Tanneguy du Chastel was made equerry
- Louis of Luxembourg, Count of Saint-Pol, was made constable, etc.
- A committee of 36 members, led by Dunois, was to reform the abuses of government.

Louis XI did not observe the conditions for long.

== Aftermath ==
Louis XI forgave some of the rebels, but some were also punished:

- John II, Duke of Bourbon was appointed Constable of France in 1483;
- Louis XI ravaged the castle of Chaumont of Pierre d'Amboise to punish the Amboise family for supporting the League of the Public Weal. The king pardoned them four years later and even provided some of the funds needed for reconstruction of Chaumont;
- In 1465, Charles de Melun, governor of Paris and the Bastille, succeeded De la Rivière. Convicted for having links with the leaders of the league, he was executed in 1468 in Andelys. His property was confiscated and given to Antoine de Chabannes;
- In March 1466, Charles of France, already struggling with the Duke of Brittany, could not deal with Louis XI, and lost Normandy. He fled to the court of Brittany;
- Jacques of Armagnac, Duke of Nemours and Count of La Marche, had been pardoned by the king several times. In 1475, indignant at a new treason, he besieged and took the castle of Carlat. The duke was imprisoned at the Bastille, tried and beheaded in the public square in Paris in 1477.

In 1468, Charles the Bold formed a new league with Charles of France, Duke John of Alençon and Francis II, Duke of Brittany, with the support of Edward IV of England. But Louis XI was strongly supported by the States General at Tours in April, and succeeded in separating Francis II and Charles of France from the Leaguers (Treaty of Ancenis).

== Results ==
Both Charles and Louis were prone to overreaching themselves, and Louis's machinations nearly resulted in military defeat at Charles's hands. However, insurrections in his newly acquired territories of Lorraine and Switzerland weakened Charles's efforts. Charles himself was killed in the Battle of Nancy against the Swiss, and Louis was saved from his greatest adversary. He had already taken his revenge on Charles's allies within France. The great duchy of Burgundy was then absorbed into the kingdom of France. The League of the Public Weal was routed in its every objective.

== See also ==
The Mad war, a later conflict in France from 1485 that also featured a League of the Public Weal fighting against the French king

== Sources ==
- Adams, George, The Growth of the French Nation, Chautauqua Century Press, 1896.
- Hoyt, Robert, Europe in the Middle Ages, Harcourt, Brace and World, Inc., 2nd ed., 1966
- Vaughan, Richard; Small, Graem (2010). Philip the Good: The Apogee of Burgundy. Woodbridge: The Boydell Press. ISBN 9780851159171. OCLC 1015575845.
