= Treaty of Conflans =

1465 treaty between France and Count Charles of Charolais

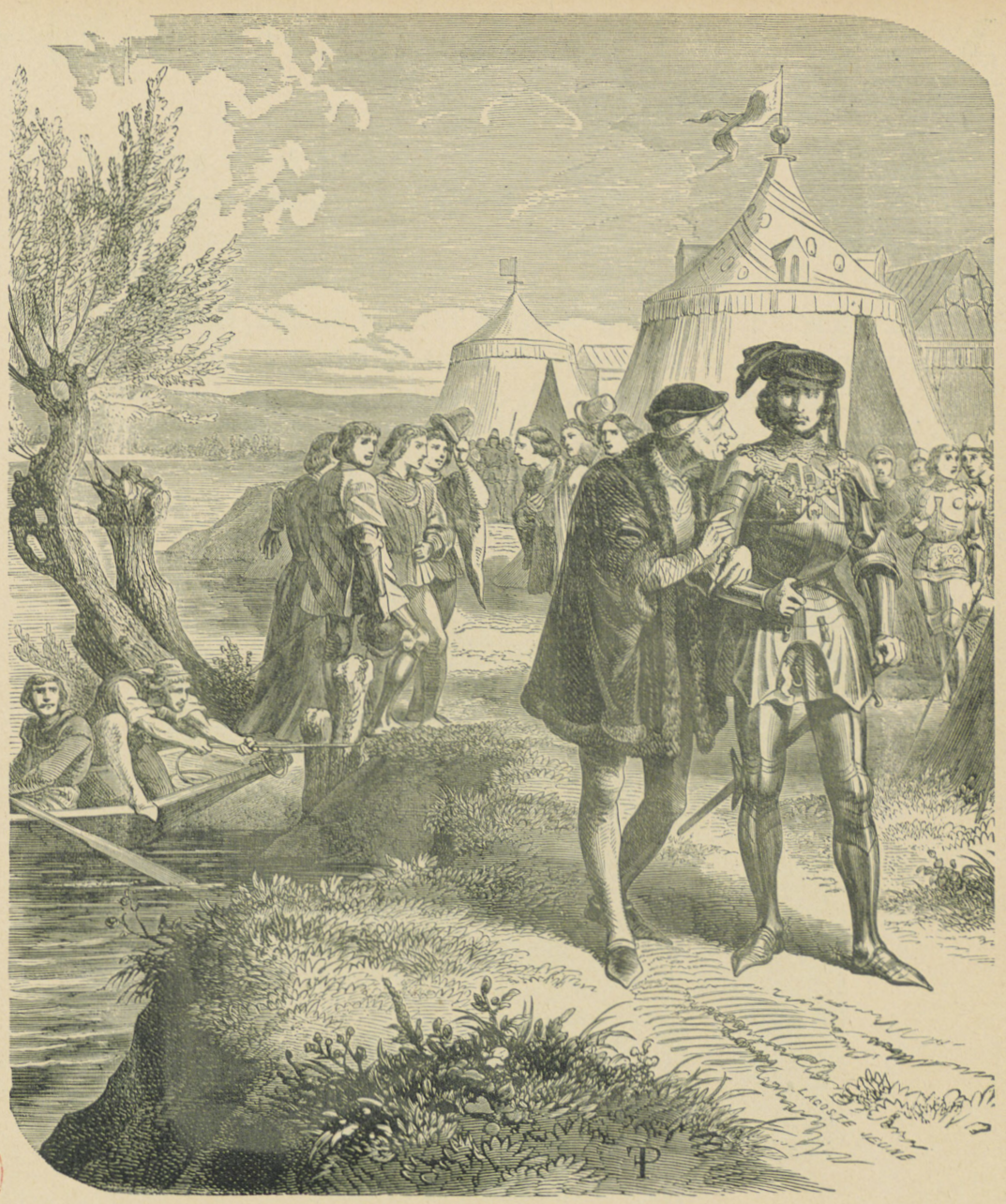
Illustration of the Treaty of Conflans by French painter Henri Félix Emmanuel Philippoteaux (c. 1860)

The Treaty of Conflans (or the Peace of Conflans) was signed on 5 October 1465 between King Louis XI of France and Count Charles of Charolais. This treaty was signed months after the Battle of Montlhéry (13 July 1465), where the French dukes of Alençon, Burgundy, Berry, Bourbon and Lorraine fought King Louis to a standstill.

== Details ==
The dukes forced King Louis to sign the agreement, which officially ended the League of the Public Weal. Based on the terms of the treaty, Normandy was restored to the Duke of Berry and Burgundy reclaimed the Somme towns, Boulogne and Ponthieu. The treaty confirmed female inheritance for Macon, Auxerre, Bar-sur-Seine, Boulogne, and the Somme.

== Aftermath ==
Months later, King Louis declared to the Parlement at Paris that the treaties of Conflans and Saint Maur were null and void, having been signed under duress. Consequently, Louis would attempt to avoid the treaty, as well as to split the French dukes by diplomatic means.

== Sources ==
- Bradbury, Jim (2004). The Routledge Companion to Medieval Warfare. Routledge.
- Potter, David (1993). War and Government in the French Provinces, Picardy 1470-1560. Cambridge University Press.
- Saenger, Paul (Spring 1977). "Burgundy and the Inalienability of Appanages in the Reign of Louis XI". French Historical Studies. 10 (1): 1–26. doi:10.2307/286114. JSTOR 286114.
