= Olivier de la Marche =

French courtier, soldier, chronicler and poet

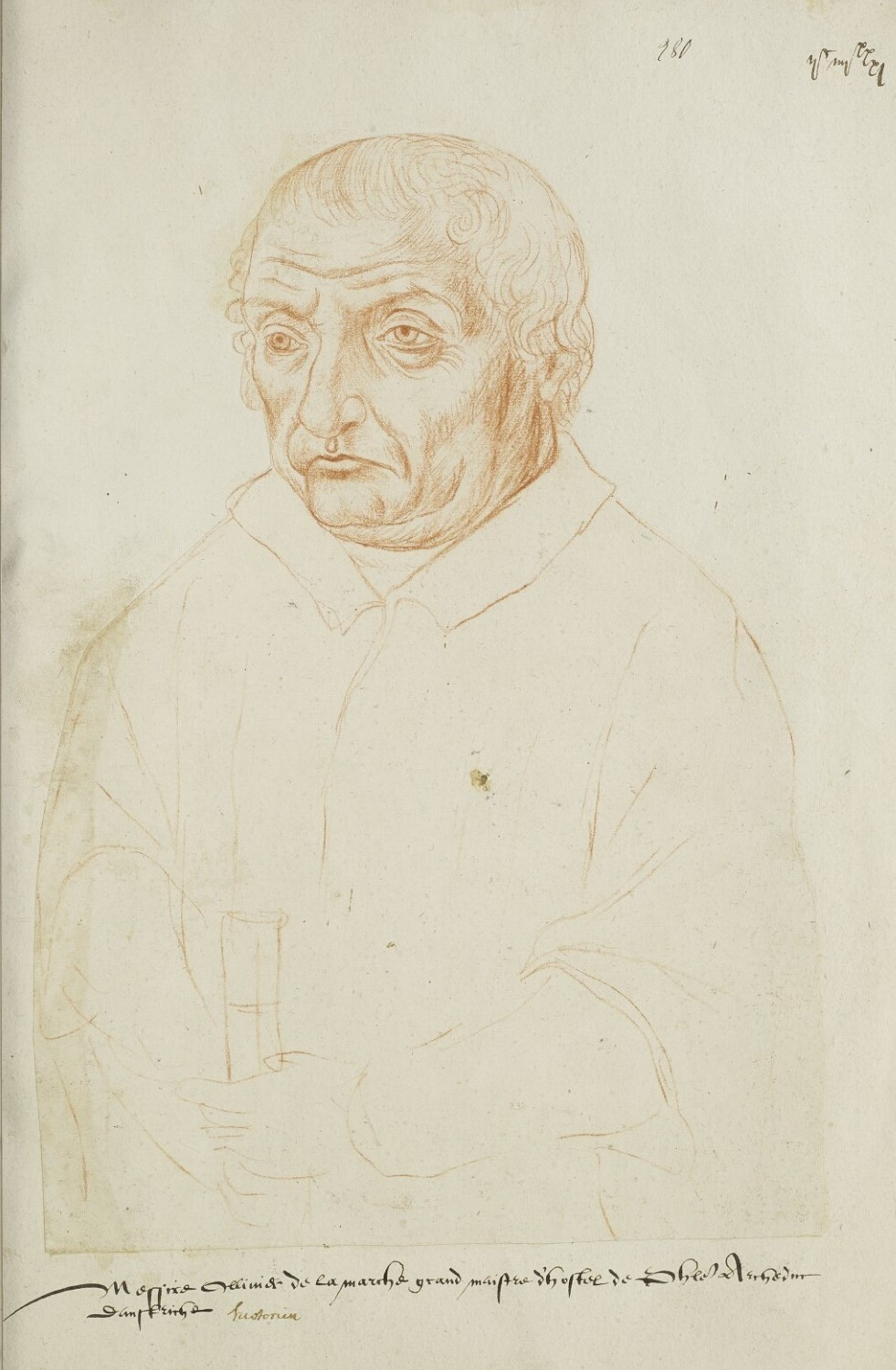
Contemporary drawing of de la Marche

Olivier de la Marche (1425–1502) was a courtier, soldier, chronicler, and poet in the last decades of the independent Duchy of Burgundy. He was close to Charles the Bold, and after his death held the important position of maître d'hotel to his daughter Mary of Burgundy, and her husband, Maximilian of Austria, and was sent on a mission as ambassador to France.

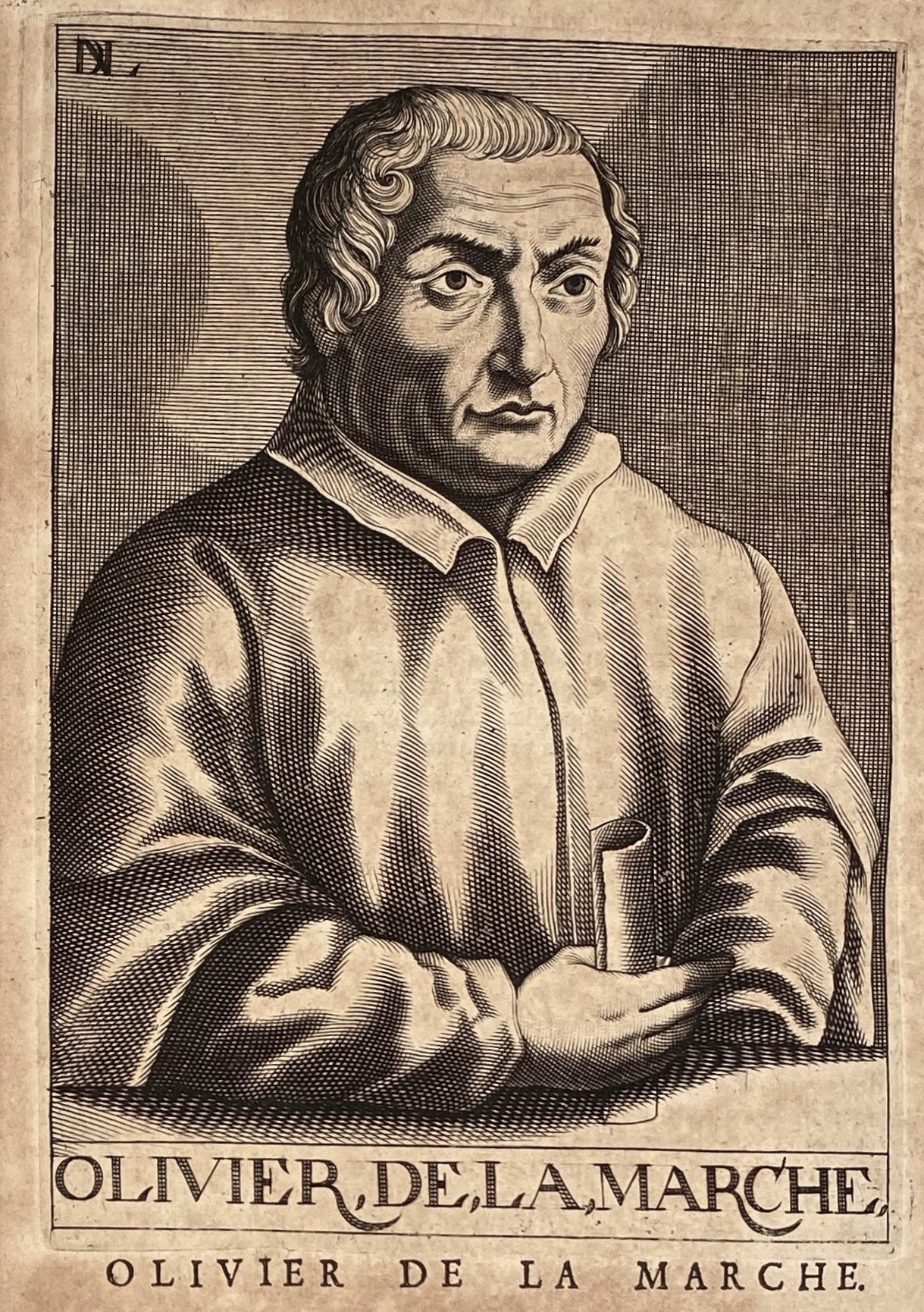
Olivier de La Marche

He saw at close hand the dispute over Flanders between the kingdom of France and the dynasty of the Habsburgs after Charles' death. The area then held a central place in the Empire over which Charles V and his successors wanted hegemony.

His best-known work is his memoirs, which were published in 1562.
