= Tijdschrift van de Koninklijke Vereniging voor Nederlandse Muziekgeschiedenis =

- Discipline: Music history
- Language: Dutch, English
- Edited by: Eric Jas

Publication details
- Former name(s): Tijdschrift der Vereeniging voor Noord-Nederlandsche Muziekgeschiedenis, Tijdschrift der Vereeniging voor Nederlandsche Muziekgeschiedenis, Tijdschrift voor Muziekwetenschap, Tijdschrift van de Vereniging voor Nederlandse Muziekgeschiedenis
- History: 1882-present
- Publisher: Koninklijke Vereniging voor Nederlandse Muziekgeschiedenis (Netherlands)
- Frequency: Biannually

Standard abbreviations
- ISO 4: Tijdschr. K. Ver. Ned. Muziekgeschied.

Indexing
- ISSN: 1383-7079 (print); 1875-6409 (web)
- LCCN: 2004235637
- JSTOR: 13837079
- OCLC no.: 865210651

Links
- Journal homepage

The Tijdschrift van de Koninklijke Vereniging voor Nederlandse Muziekgeschiedenis (English: Journal of the Royal Society for Music History of the Netherlands) is a peer-reviewed academic journal covering the music history of the Low Countries. It is published by the Koninklijke Vereniging voor Nederlandse Muziekgeschiedenis (English: Royal Society for Music History of the Netherlands) and the editor-in-chief is Eric Jas (Utrecht University). It was established in 1882 as the Tijdschrift der Vereeniging voor Noord-Nederlandsche Muziekgeschiedenis, renamed "Tijdschrift der Vereeniging voor Nederlandsche Muziekgeschiedenis" in 1909. In 1948 the name was changed again to the more general Tijdschrift voor Muziekwetenschap (English: Journal for Musicology), but in 1960 this reverted to the previous Tijdschrift van de Vereniging voor Nederlandse Muziekgeschiedenis. The journal obtained its current title in 1995 when the society obtained the right to call itself "Royal". The journal is published in two yearly issues, although these are often combined in one special issue covering a single topic.

== Abstracting and indexing ==
The journal is abstracted and indexed in the Arts and Humanities Citation Index, Current Contents/Arts & Humanities, EBSCO databases, Répertoire International de Littérature Musicale, and Scopus.

== Editors-in-chief ==
The following persons have been or are editor-in-chief of the journal:

- Albert Smijers, 1921-1955
- Eduard Reeser & John Daniskas, 1959-1967
- Willem Elders, 1968-1988
- Arend Jan Gierveld, 1989-1997
- Eric Jas, 1998–present
