= Revue du Nord =

Academic journal of history and archaeology

- Discipline: Archaeology
- Language: English

Standard abbreviations
- ISO 4: Rev. du Nord

Indexing
- ISSN: 0035-2624 (print); 2271-7005 (web)
- OCLC no.: 1764146

The Revue du Nord is a peer-reviewed academic journal of history and archaeology published by the joint universities of Northern France. The journal concentrates on northern France, Belgium, and the Netherlands. It was established in 1910 and the editor-in-chief is Philippe Guignet (Charles de Gaulle University – Lille III).

== Abstracting and indexing ==
The journal is abstracted and indexed in:

- Scopus
- FRANCIS
- PASCAL
- Historical Abstracts
