= Somme towns =

Series of fortified towns in 15th century north east France

The modern Hauts-de-France region of north eastern France with the nine "Somme towns"

The Somme and its basin, showing Abbeville, Amiens, Corbie and Saint-Quentin

The Somme towns (French: Villes de la Somme) were a series of nine fortified towns in Picardy in north eastern France, constituting, in the 15th century, a single domain. They were given the name because most of them, but not all, were in the valley of the river Somme. They became strategically important in the conflict between the kings of France and the Valois dukes of Burgundy as they formed a defensive line between the French royal domain and the Burgundian Netherlands.

== Name and geography ==
The name "the Somme towns" is applied in the historiography of 15th century France (Note: For example, historians who have referred to the territory as the "so-called Somme towns" include Robert Knecht, Helmut Koenigsberger and Richard Vaughan) to a series of specific fortified towns in Picardy. With their surrounding districts, they constituted a contiguous domain or territory comprising nine towns and castellanies along or near the river Somme. These were Amiens, Abbeville, Saint-Quentin, Corbie, Doullens, Saint-Riquier, Arleux, Mortagne, and Crèvecœur.

Amiens, Abbeville, Corbie and Saint-Quentin are located on the Somme. Saint-Riquier is not on the river itself, but is still in the Somme valley, and close to Abbeville. However, the other four towns are outside of the Somme valley. Doullens is in the valley of the river Authie, which runs in parallel to the Somme flowing into the English Channel. The other three towns are further away, on the river Scheldt or its tributaries: Arleux is on the river Sensée; Crèvecœur is on the Scheldt itself; (Note: The commune's full name is Crèvecœur-sur-l'Escaut, that is Crèvecœur on the Scheldt in English.) and Mortagne is at the confluence between the Scheldt and the river Scarpe.

== History ==
The Somme towns were strategically important in the 15th century conflict between the Valois dukes of Burgundy and the kings of France. Picardy, the region in north eastern France in which they were located, lay between the French royal domain in the Île-de-France and the dukes' Low Countries possessions, the Burgundian Netherlands. The fortifications of the Somme towns, therefore, formed a defensive line protecting Paris from invasion from the Low Countries. If, on the other hand, they were held by the dukes they could provide defence from an attack from France.

Picardy became part of the royal domain by the 13th century but during the Hundred Years' War the kings of France lost control of it to the English until French royal power was gradually restored in the 15th century. Contention between the French kings and the dukes of Burgundy over the Somme towns began in the 1420s and lasted for a century. It was initially settled by the Treaty of Arras, 1435, by which Charles VII of France transferred the Somme towns to Philip the Good of Burgundy. It was not an absolute transfer, however, as the towns were security for a loan to Charles and could be bought back by the French king at any time for 400,000 écus.

The towns remained in the hands of Philip the Good for the next 30 years, however Charles's successor Louis XI bought them back in 1463. This was a major triumph for Louis in the early years of his reign as it formed a key part of his strategy to extend the royal domain and power. Philip's son, Charles the Bold was angered by this and pressed for their return which he achieved by the Treaty of Conflans 1465. This provided that the king could not redeem them until after Charles's death. However, the conflict between Charles and Louis continued including through the Burgundian Wars which culminated in the defeat and death of Charles at the Battle of Nancy in 1477. The Somme towns were one of the Burgundian territories which Louis then seized and annexed. They remained a point of contention between France and Charles's Habsburg heirs until Charles V gave up his claims to them at the Treaty of Cambrai of 1529.

== Sources ==
=== Bibliography ===
- Barnett, Correlli (1974). Marlborough. Eyre Methuen. ISBN 978-0-413-29540-8.
- Blockmans, Wim; Prevenier, Walter (1999). The Promised Lands: The Low Countries Under Burgundian Rule, 1369-1530. University of Pennsylvania Press. ISBN 978-0-8122-1382-9.
- Demolon, Pierre; Louis, Étienne; Ropital, Jean-François (1988). Mottes et maisons-fortes en Ostrevent médiéval (in French). FeniXX réédition numérique. ISBN 978-2-307-49629-8.
- Flatrès, Pierre; Genevoix, Maurice; Papy, Louis (1980). Atlas et géographie du Nord et de la Picardie (in French). Flammarion. ISBN 978-2-403-00932-3.
- Kekewich, Margaret L. (2008). The Good King: René of Anjou and Fifteenth Century Europe. Palgrave Macmillan UK. ISBN 978-0-230-58221-7.
- Knecht, Robert (2007). The Valois: Kings of France 1328-1589. Bloomsbury Academic. ISBN 978-1-85285-522-2.
- Koenigsberger, H.G. (2001). Monarchies, States Generals and Parliaments: The Netherlands in the Fifteenth and Sixteenth Centuries. Cambridge University Press. ISBN 978-0-521-80330-4.
- Murphy, Neil (2020). "Royal entries in fifteenth century France: Louis XI's Northern Progress 1463-64". In Anderson, E.J.; Farquhar, J.; Richards, J. (eds.). Visible Exports / Imports: New Research on Medieval and Renaissance European Art and Culture. Cambridge Scholars Publishing. ISBN 978-1-5275-5181-7.
- Potter, David (2003). War and Government in the French Provinces. Cambridge University Press. ISBN 978-0-521-89300-8.
- Price-Wilkin, Rebecca (1997). The Late Gothic Abbey Church of Saint-Riquier: An Investigation of Historical Consciousness. University of Michigan. ISBN 978-0-591-41674-9.
- Shaw, Christine (2018). "Treaty of Cambrai (1529)". In Martel, G. (ed.). The Encyclopedia of Diplomacy. Vol. 4. Wiley. ISBN 978-1-118-88791-2.
- Stein, Robert (2017). Magnanimous Dukes and Rising States: The Unification of the Burgundian Netherlands, 1380-1480. Oxford University Press. ISBN 978-0-19-875710-8.
- Sumption, Jonathan (1991). The Hundred Years War. Vol. 4 - Cursed Kings. University of Pennsylvania Press. ISBN 978-0-8122-4799-2.
- Vaughan, Richard (1975). Valois Burgundy. Allen Lane. ISBN 978-0-7139-0924-1.
- Vaughan, Richard (2002a) [First published 1970]. Philip the Good: The Apogee of Burgundy. Boydell Press. ISBN 978-0-85115-917-1.
- Vaughan, Richard (2002b) [First published 1973]. Charles the Bold: The Last Valois Duke of Burgundy. Boydell Press. ISBN 978-0-85115-918-8.
- Verbruggen, J.F. (1997). The Art of Warfare in Western Europe During the Middle Ages: From the Eighth Century to 1340. Boydell Press. ISBN 978-0-85115-570-8.
- Walsh, R.J. (2005). Charles the Bold and Italy (1467-1477): Politics and Personnel. Liverpool University Press. ISBN 978-0-85323-838-6.

=== Websites ===
- INSEE (2024). "Commune de Crèvecœur-sur-l'Escaut". Institut national de la statistique et des études économiques. Archived from the original on 13 November 2024.
