= Battle of Grandson =

Part of the Burgundian Wars (1476)

Coordinates: 46.8169°N 6.6331°E

- Part of Burgundian Wars
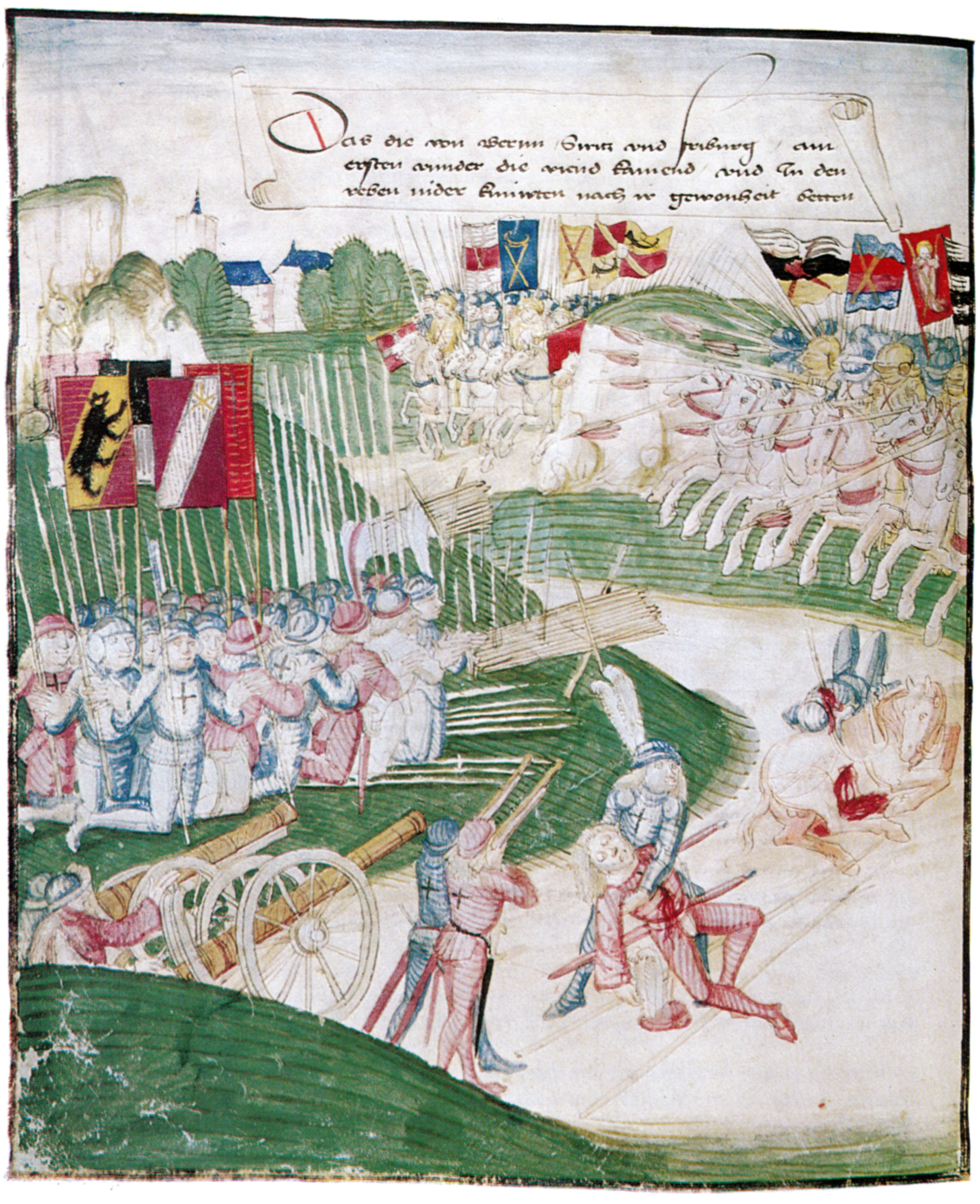
- The Swiss army (left) and the Burgundian army (right) at the Battle of Grandson. Illustration from the Berner Chronik by Diebold Schilling the Elder (1483), who was present at the battle.
Date	2 March 1476
Location	Near Grandson, Vaud
Result	Swiss victory

Belligerents
Burgundian State	Old Swiss Confederacy

Commanders and leaders
Charles the Bold; Louis de Chalon-Châtel-Guyon †	Wilhelm Herter von Hertneck

Strength
~20,000	~18,000

Casualties and losses
Minimal	Minimal

The Battle of Grandson was fought on 2 March 1476, during the Burgundian Wars, and resulted in a major defeat for Charles the Bold, Duke of Burgundy, at the hands of the Old Swiss Confederacy.

== Background ==
In 1475, the town of Grandson in Vaud, which belonged to Charles the Bold's ally Jacques of Savoy, had been brutally taken by the Old Swiss Confederacy, led by the Canton of Bern. After negotiations for the restitution of Vaud failed in January 1476, Charles left Lorraine with the bulk of his army, consisting of about 12,000 men, and advanced through the Jura Mountains towards Vaud. After seizing Yverdon, his army on 21 February captured the town of Grandson and laid siege to Grandson Castle, which surrendered on 28 February.

=== Execution of Grandson Castle garrison ===
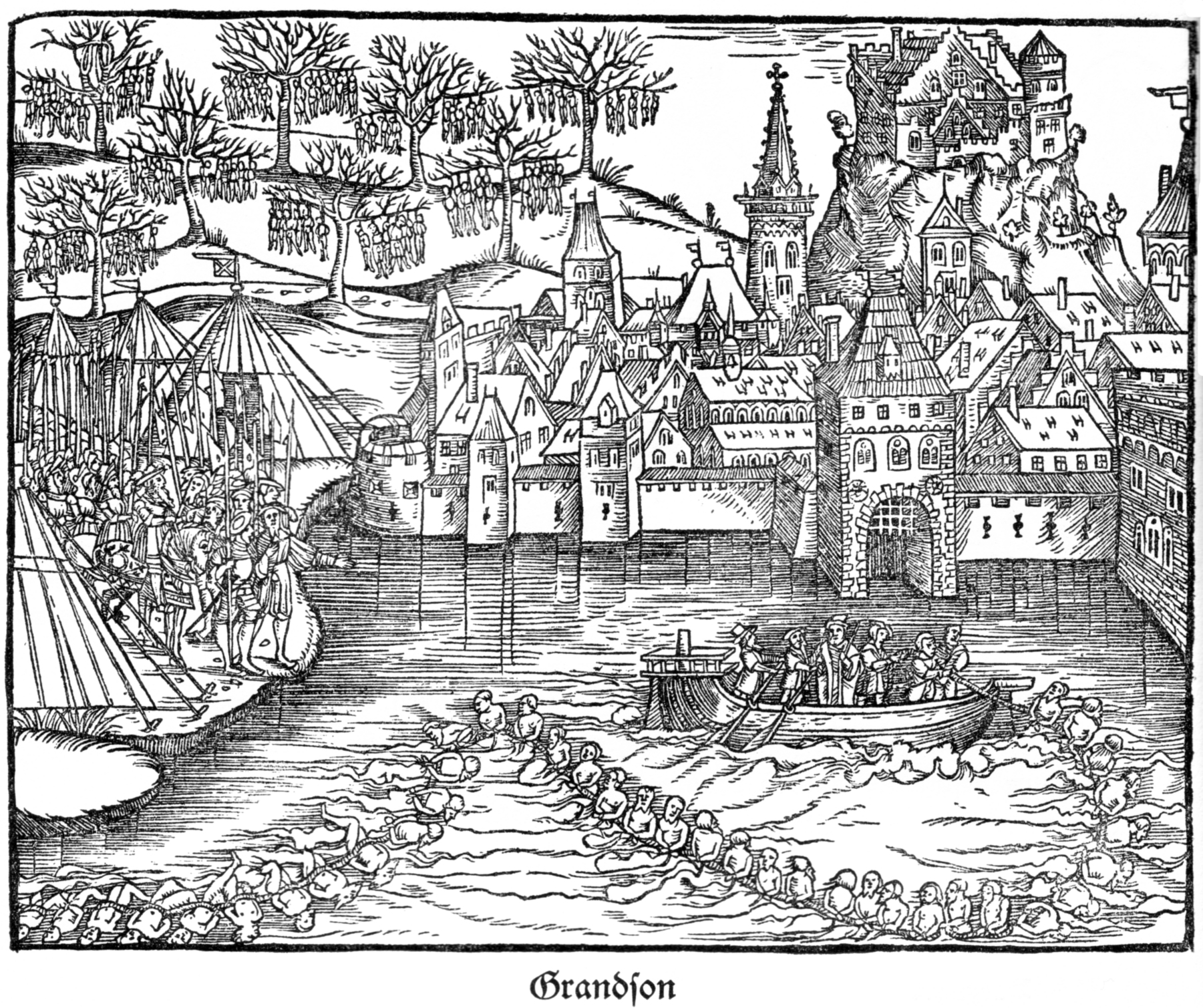
The siege of Grandson and the execution of the Swiss garrison, illustration by Johann Stumpf (1548)

After the surrender of Grandson Castle, Charles had its garrison executed by drowning in Lake Neuchâtel or hanging. Swiss sources are unanimous in stating that the men gave up only when Charles assured them that they would be spared. The historian Panigarola, who was with Charles, claimed that the garrison had thrown themselves on the mercy of the duke, and it was up to his discretion what to do with them. He ordered all 412 men of the garrison to be executed. In a scene Panigarola described as "shocking and horrible" and sure to fill the Swiss with dread, all the victims were led past Charles' tent and hanged from trees or drowned in the lake in an execution that lasted four hours.

== Battle ==
After taking Grandson, Charles set up his camp north of the town and protected it by establishing two garrisons nearby. The first occupied Vaumarcus Castle and blocked the main axis leading to Neuchâtel, and the second entrenched itself further north. The opposition of the other Swiss cantons to the Bernese operations of 1475 in Vaud made the Confederate reinforcements arrive too late to retake Grandson. The Swiss had no news of the fate of the Grandson garrison and assembled their forces in the hope of lifting the siege. Their army, consisting of 18,000 troops from the eight cantons and numerous allies, established itself at Bevaix on 1 March and attacked Vaumarcus Castle. With about 20,000 men, Charles began to establish himself near the town of Concise on 2 March in an unfavourable position.

Advancing on two routes, the Swiss had halted near the forest and awaited their main army to arrive when they encountered Charles's forces near Concise. In the ensuing skirmish, the Burgundian cavalry was unable to hold the enemy vanguard, and Charles ordered his troops to pull back to a more favorable ground. During the delicate maneuver, the bulk of the Swiss army arrived, and the Burgundian army, already pulling back, soon became confused when the second and larger body of Swiss troops appeared. The speed of the Swiss advance did not give the Burgundians time to make much use of their artillery. The withdrawal soon turned into a rout when the Burgundian troops panicked and fled. For a time, Charles rode among them shouting orders, but once started, the rout was unstoppable, and he was forced to flee as well.

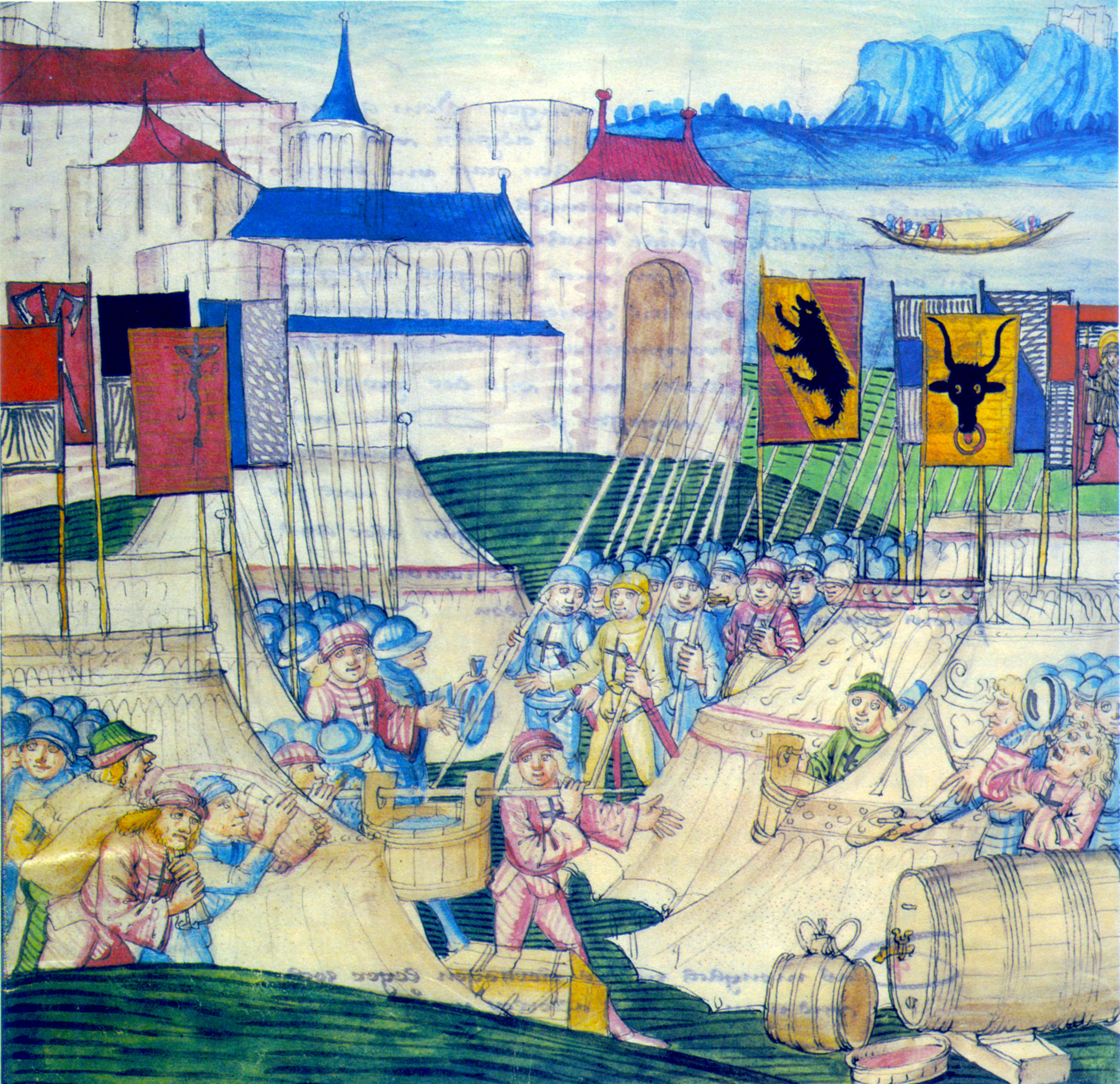
Pillage of the Burgundian camp after the Battle of Grandson, illustration by Diebold Schilling the Elder (1483)

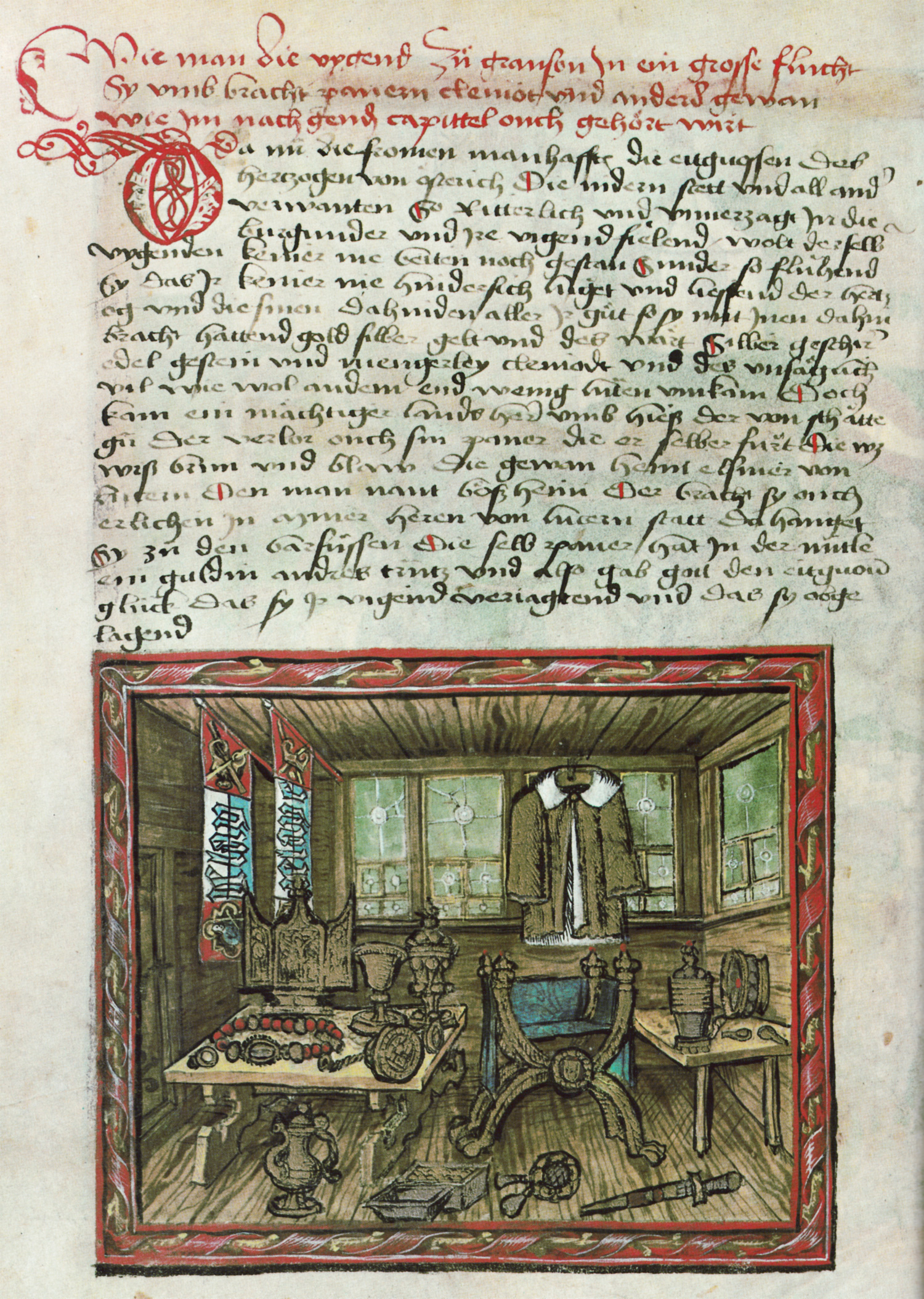
The booty of Grandson put on display in Lucerne, illustration by Diebold Schilling the Younger (1513)

Few casualties were suffered on either side since the Swiss did not have the cavalry necessary to chase the Burgundians far. At little cost to themselves, the Swiss had defeated one of the most feared armies in Europe and taken an impressive amount of treasure. Charles had the habit of travelling to battles with an array of priceless artifacts as talismans, from carpets belonging to Alexander the Great to the 55-carat Sancy diamond and the Three Brothers jewel. All of them were looted from his tent by the Confederate army, together with his silver bath and ducal seal. The Swiss initially had little idea of the value of their loot. A small surviving part of this fantastic booty is on display in various Swiss museums today, and a few remaining artillery pieces can be seen in the museum of La Neuveville, near Neuchâtel, Switzerland.

== Aftermath ==
After the battle, the Swiss troops came upon the bodies of their countrymen still hanging from trees in Grandson. An eyewitness, Peterman Etterlin, described the scene:

There were found sadly the honorable men still freshly hanging on the trees in front of the castle whom the tyrant had hanged. It was a wretched, pitiable sight. There were hung ten or twenty men on one bough. The trees were bent down and were completely full. [H]ere hanged a father and a son next to each other, there two brothers or other friends. And there came the honorable men who knew them; who were their friends, cousins and brothers, who found them miserably hanging. There was first anger and distress in crying and bewailing.

Charles had attempted to break the will of the Swiss by killing any of their countrymen whom he could apprehend. Instead, he united them as never before. When the Burgundians met the Swiss at the Battle of Morat (Murten in German) in June 1476, the Swiss annihilated his army.

== See also ==
- Battles of the Old Swiss Confederacy

== References and further reading ==
- Heinrich Brennwald, Schweizerchronik, (Basel: Basler Buch- und Antiquariatshandlung, 1910) 2: 244–249.
- Philippe de Commynes, Memoirs: the Reign of Louis XI, (Baltimore: Penguin Books, 1972), pp. 280–282.
- Gerald Edlibach, Chronik, (Zurich: Meyer, 1847), pp. 150–151.
- Petterlin Etterlin, Kronika von der loblichen Eidgnoschaft, (Basel: Eckenstien, 1752), pp. 89–91.
- Johannes Knebel, Chronik aus den Zeiten des Burgunderkriegs, (Basel: Bahnmaier, 1851) 2: 357–360.
- "Panigarola and den Herzog (Galeazzo Maria Sforza) von Orbe," 4 March 1476 as cited in Wilhelm Oechsli ed. Quellenbuch zur Schweizergeschichte, (Zurich: Schulthess, 1901), pp. 232–234.
- Diebold Schilling, Die Berner-Chronik, (Bern: Wyss,) 1: 373–375.
- Alberto Winkler, The Swiss and War: the Impact of Society on the Swiss Military in the Fourteenth and Fifteenth Centuries, unpublished PhD dissertation, Brigham Young University, 1982, pp. 73–76.
- Richard Vaughan, Charles the Bold: The Last Valois Duke of Burgundy. London, Longman Group Ltd., 1973.
- Florens Deuchler, Die Burgunderbeute: Inventar der Beutestücke aus den Schlachten von Grandson, Murten und Nancy 1476/1477, Verlag Stämpfli & Cie, Bern 1963.
