= Saubannerzug =

1477 Swiss Military campaign

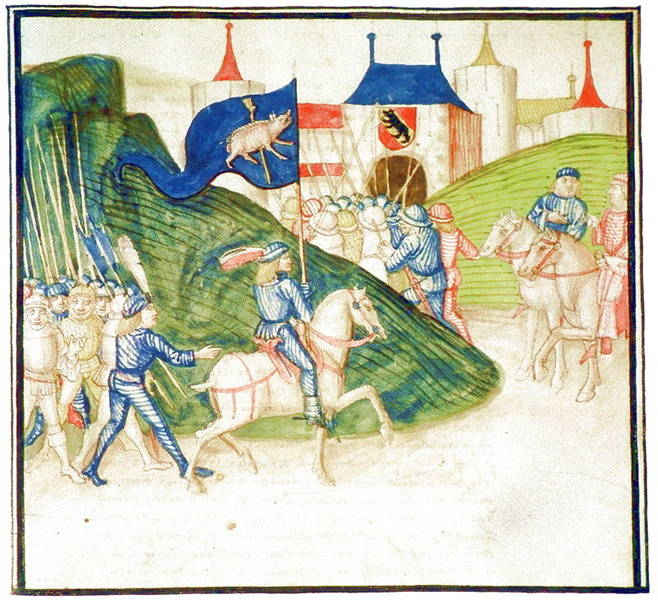
Depiction in the Berner Chronik, showing the Saubanner outside of the gates of Bern

The Saubannerzug (German for "hog-banner campaign", also Kolbenbannerzug "club-banner campaign", Zug des torechten Lebens "campaign of the foolhardy company") was a military campaign of irregular Swiss forces during the Fasnacht (Alemannic carnival) period of the year 1477, in the aftermath of the Battle of Nancy. It consisted of disgruntled men-at-arms from Central Switzerland who moved towards Geneva to enforce the payment of a sum of 24,000 Gulden owed to the Old Swiss Confederacy as ransom to escape looting (Brandschatz).

== Events of 21 February to 4 March ==
The company consisted of a core of about 700 mercenaries of Uri, Schwyz and Lucerne, who had participated in the Battle of Nancy, and who were unhappy with the distribution of the spoils. This company formed by 21 February, and was joined by men of other Swiss cantons, increasing to an estimated total strength of about 1,700 to 1,800 men. They caused embarrassment for the Swiss urban elites in Bern, Zürich and Lucerne, who were engaged in diplomatic negotiations with Savoy and France, and who wanted to avoid the impression of not being in control of their own troops.

As the company marched from Central Switzerland towards Burgundy, they threatened Swiss towns on their way. They arrived outside of Bern on 24 February, and the city council raised the 3,000-strong militia to protect the city. After promising not to interfere with Bern, they were let inside the city and given food and shelter, moving on towards Fribourg on 27 February. Outside of Fribourg, they were joined by bands from Zug and Unterwalden, now forming a force of about 2,000 strong. At this point, they were met with negotiators from Geneva, Greyerz, Basel and Strasbourg, as well as representatives of the Swiss diet, and on 4 March 1477, an agreement was settled upon which forced Geneva to pay a third of its debts immediately, and providing hostages as security for the rest. In addition, Geneva had to pay two Gulden and a drink of wine for each member of the company.

== The Saubanner ==
The banner used in this campaign showed a boar (sau being a term for wild pig) and a mace or club (kolben). The alternative term for the campaign, torechtes Leben is from Early Modern High German torecht for "foolhardy, daredevil" (Modern German töricht "simple, fatuous") and leben (lit. "life"), at the time term for a guild or corporation.

Diebold Schilling the Elder describing the banner mentions only these two designs, the boar (eber) and the mace (kolben), and the illustrations of his Berner Chronik depict them on a triangular blue banner. But there is a banner preserved in the Museum in Zug castle which according to local tradition is identified as the original Saubanner. In contrast to Schilling's description, this banner is rectangular, and shows a much more complicated design: it features a sow (not a boar) with three piglets being fed with acorns by a fool, who takes the acorns from a large bag over his shoulder, while holding a club in his right hand. In the top corner are the coats of arms of Zug, that of Küssnacht am Rigi and that of the Wissnacht family of butchers.

== Significance ==
Traditional Swiss historiography based on 15th and 16th century chroniclers such as Diebold Schilling depicted the Saubannerzug as rowdy march of youthful ruffians hatched out of drunken Fasnacht revelry, and indeed the term Saubannerzug in modern (journalistic) Swiss Standard German is used in the sense of hooliganism and rioting. Würgler (2004) argues that the chroniclers, representing the interests of the urban patriciate, consciously and severely misrepresented the episode. Würgler argues that the Saubanner enterprise was in reality a serious political and military enterprise of the Forest cantons in defense of their interests threatened by the coalition and Burgrecht treaties of the urban cantons. These tensions culminated in the Saubanner expedition, but they remained latent until their peaceful resolution in the Stanser Verkommnis of 1481.
