= Richard Puller von Hohenburg =

Alsatian and Swiss nobleman, executed for his sexuality (d. 1482)

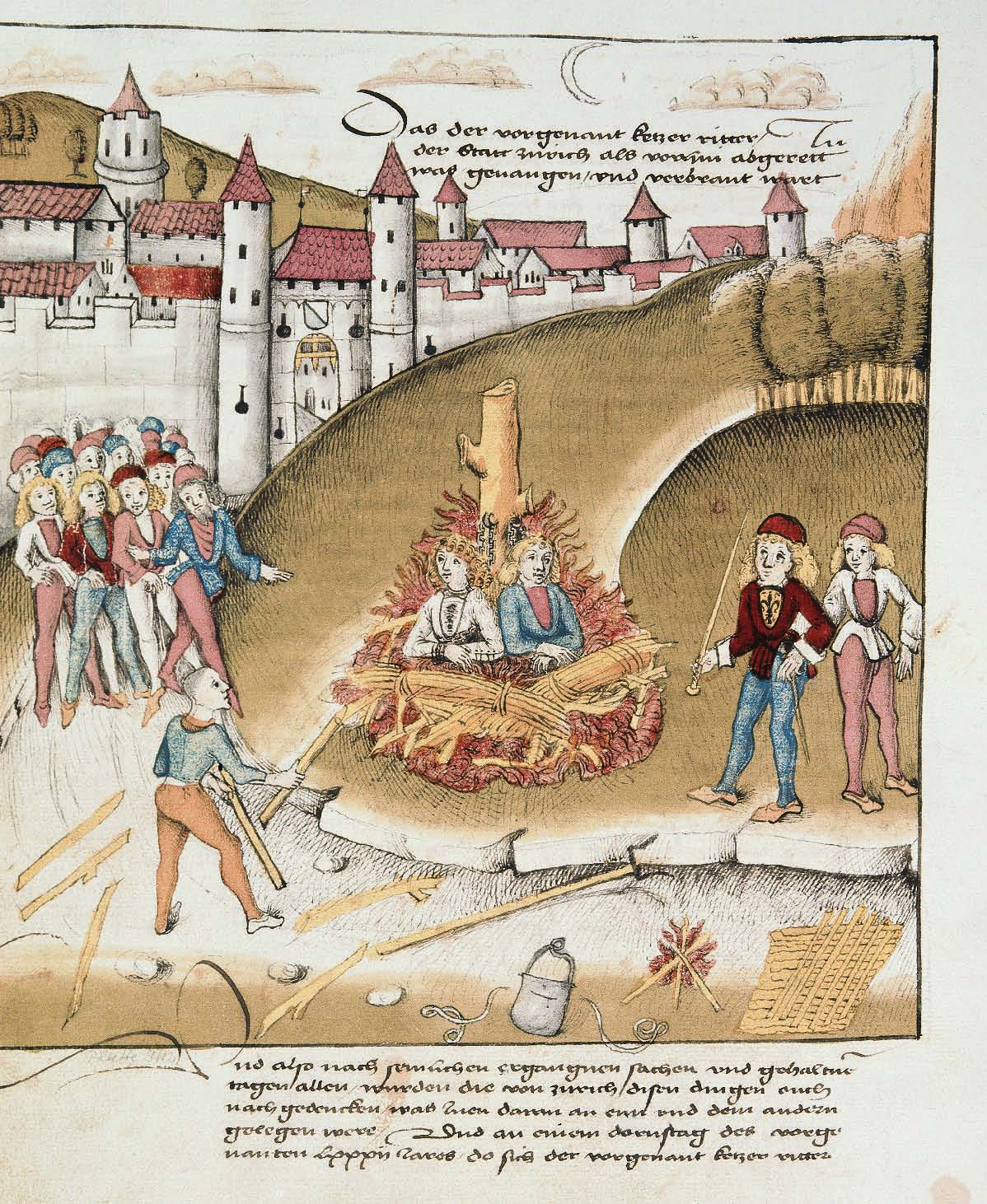
Manuscript depiction of the burning of Puller and his servant Anton Mätzler outside the walls of Zurich for sodomy, in 1482. Illustration from the Grosse Burgunderchronik of Diebold Schilling. The depiction of the execution in front of the city walls is inaccurate, as Puller was actually burned in Zurich's market square, inside the walls.

Richard Puller von Hohenburg (died 24 September 1482) was a 15th-century Alsatian and Swiss nobleman and knight. He is notable for his homosexual liaisons, his strategic avoidance of prosecution, and later execution for his homosexuality.

== Early life ==
Richard Puller von Hohenburg was born, perhaps towards the end of the 1420s, second son to the wealthy noble Wirich II Puller von Hohenburg. A politically shrewd man who had inherited much (he was a descendant of Konrad Hohenburg), Wirich and his family's reputation grew over his lifetime. It is a testament to his shrewdness that he and his son became citizens of Strasbourg in Alsace (in 1453 and 1454 respectively), though Wirich had shortly before been allied with Bishop Wilhelm von Diest, despised within the city. Wirich probably arranged Richard Puller's marriage to one Sophie Bock, daughter of the wealthy Strasbourg magistrate Hans Konrad Bock, which took place in 1455.

Wirich died sometime after 1454 and Richard's elder brother, Wirich III, was slain in battle in 1455, leaving Richard the only surviving male heir of the family. As head of the family, he first went about marrying off his sisters, but soon found himself embroiled in local feuds and trials. The details of these disputes are murky, but they apparently reached such a pitch that Löwenstein castle, an estate his family had held for generations (in fealty to the Electorate of the Palatinate), was taken from him in 1457.

== First accusation of homosexuality ==
In 1463, the Swiss noble Wirich von Berstett captured one of Puller's servants, a man named Ludwig Fischer, after Fischer had been seen dressed in lavish clothes and in possession of more money than his occupation would provide him. In early modern Europe, gifts of clothing were often used as evidence of improper sexual services, deemed either a token of love or a bribe from the paying participant. Under torture, Fischer confessed that Puller had romantically pursued him, and that he had used this to his advantage by blackmailing Puller. Puller was consequently stripped of his fiefs, which were transferred to the bishop of Strasbourg, Rupert of Palatinate-Simmern, but he was not put on trial. Shortly after, he was released from arrest.

== Second accusation and exile ==
Though he had managed to evade prosecution this time, in 1474 Puller was again accused of sodomy. Puller's enemies even claimed that, in the interval between these charges, Puller had been so wary of discovery he had a servant who witnessed a sexual act drowned. Even against such a severe charge, Puller managed to evade negative consequences through the strategic manipulation of his social status. He procured, or else forged, letters of recommendation from far-off authorities, playing the local Alsatian nobles off against the imperial powers of the Holy Roman Empire. By 1476, Puller was released upon a set of conditions: confessing his misdeeds, giving up his properties, and monastic imprisonment. Puller was quickly stripped of his Alsatian possessions, but fled from Alsace before beginning a monastic life, intent on recovering his property.

In 1476, Puller had turned to the Old Swiss Confederacy, then a popular refuge for European criminals, in search of aid in reclaiming his lost possessions. His petitions of entry not only cited (genuine) letters he had obtained from imperial and papal authorities, but outright forgeries, such as one which claimed Bishop Rupert had found him entirely innocent. He turned to city authorities at Bern for assistance, who rejected his pleas after much deliberation, and thereafter the authorities of Zurich, who were more obliging and accepted him. Zurich hoped for a lucrative feud with the rich Strasbourg, but Puller's property claims generated conflict between the Confederacy and Strasbourg (a city which had historically been a close ally of the Confederacy).

By 1480, Puller was now demanding an entire inheritance from Strasbourg (his father-in-law Hans Konrad Bock had died by 1479). Zurich could find no allies in the Confederacy for its feud against Strasbourg, and Puller's residency in Zurich was becoming a political nuisance.

== Trial and execution ==
In 1482, city officials discovered a homosexual relationship between Puller and his servant, Anton Mätzler. The convenient détente this trial provided to relations between Strasbourg and the Confederacy did not go uncommented on by contemporaries. Indeed, one source (apparently from an underling of the councillors) alleges Strasbourg made a payment of eight thousand florins to the councillors for the trial and execution of Puller, although the source was definite about Puller's guilt of the charges. Contemporary chronicler Diebold Schilling the Elder reported that, as before, this act had been discovered because of his servant's boasts of the "precious clothing, beautiful shirts, and other treasures" in his possession, which the officials had suspected to be sexual gifts from his master. Puller and his servant were charged by the officials with "heresy". Under torture by the city officials, Puller confessed to having had same-sex relationships with Mätzler and several other men. Consequently, he was sentenced to be burned at the stake alongside his servant Mätzler in the market square of Zurich. On 24 September 1482, a large crowd had gathered to see Puller executed. Puller was asked to repeat his confession, but he refused, instead claiming that the accusation of sodomy was only a cover for the Zurich officials who wished to seize his land and fortune. One of the officials mentioned by name was Hans Waldmann, then mayor of Zurich, who was later executed for several charges (among them, sodomy) after a spectacular but brief and unpopular political career in Zurich. With the execution of its last scion, the noble family of the von Hohenburgs perished, with their ancestral castle passing on to the Sickinger family.
