= Hans Schilling =

Hans Schilling may refer to:

- Hans Schilling, son of Klewi Schilling, see Schilling of Solothurn
- Hans Schilling (aviator) (1892–1916), World War I German observer flying ace
