= Boars in heraldry =

Heraldic animal

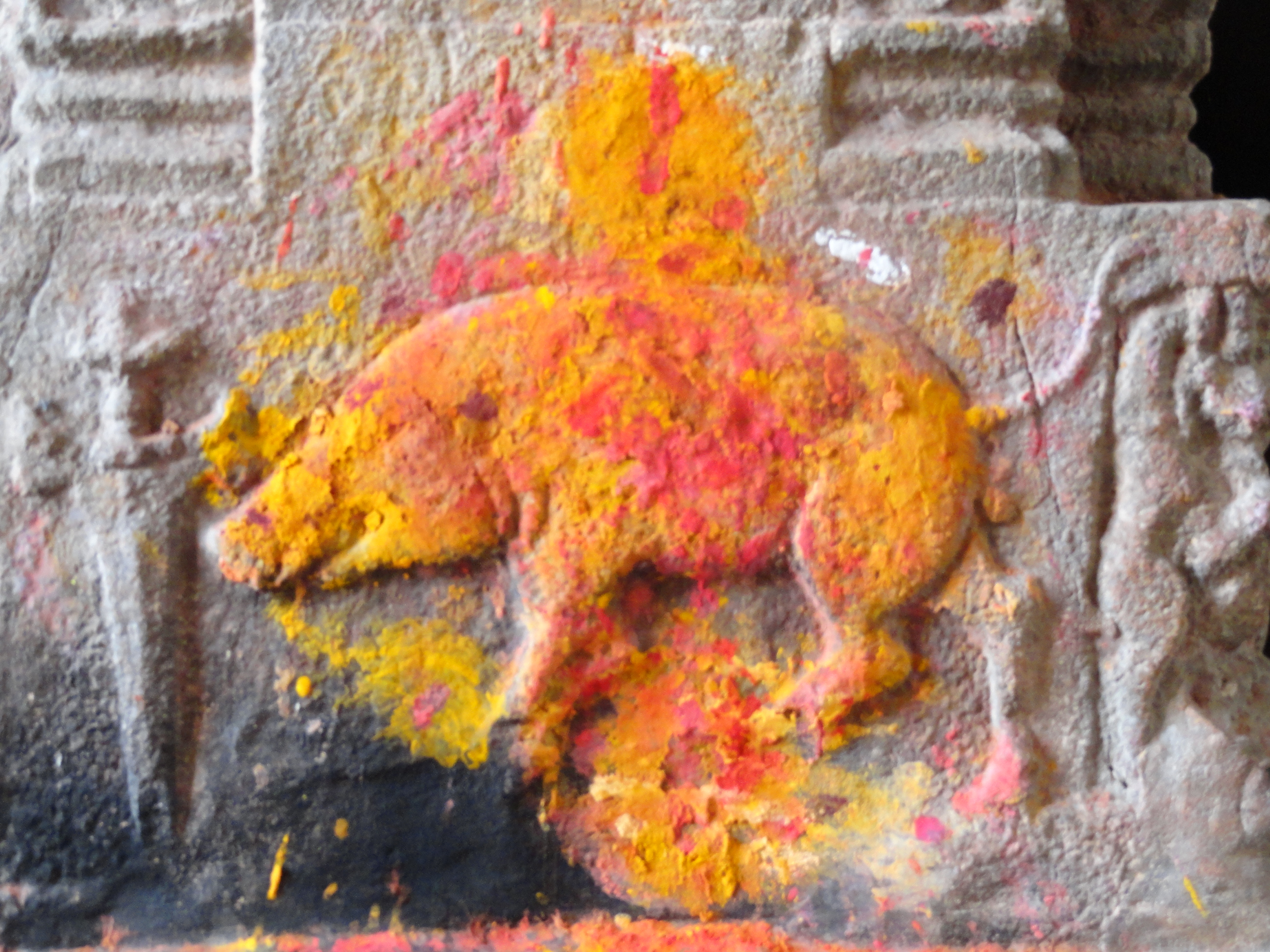
The Royal Vijayanagara(1336–1646) insignia, displaying a Sun, Moon, Dagger and Boar.

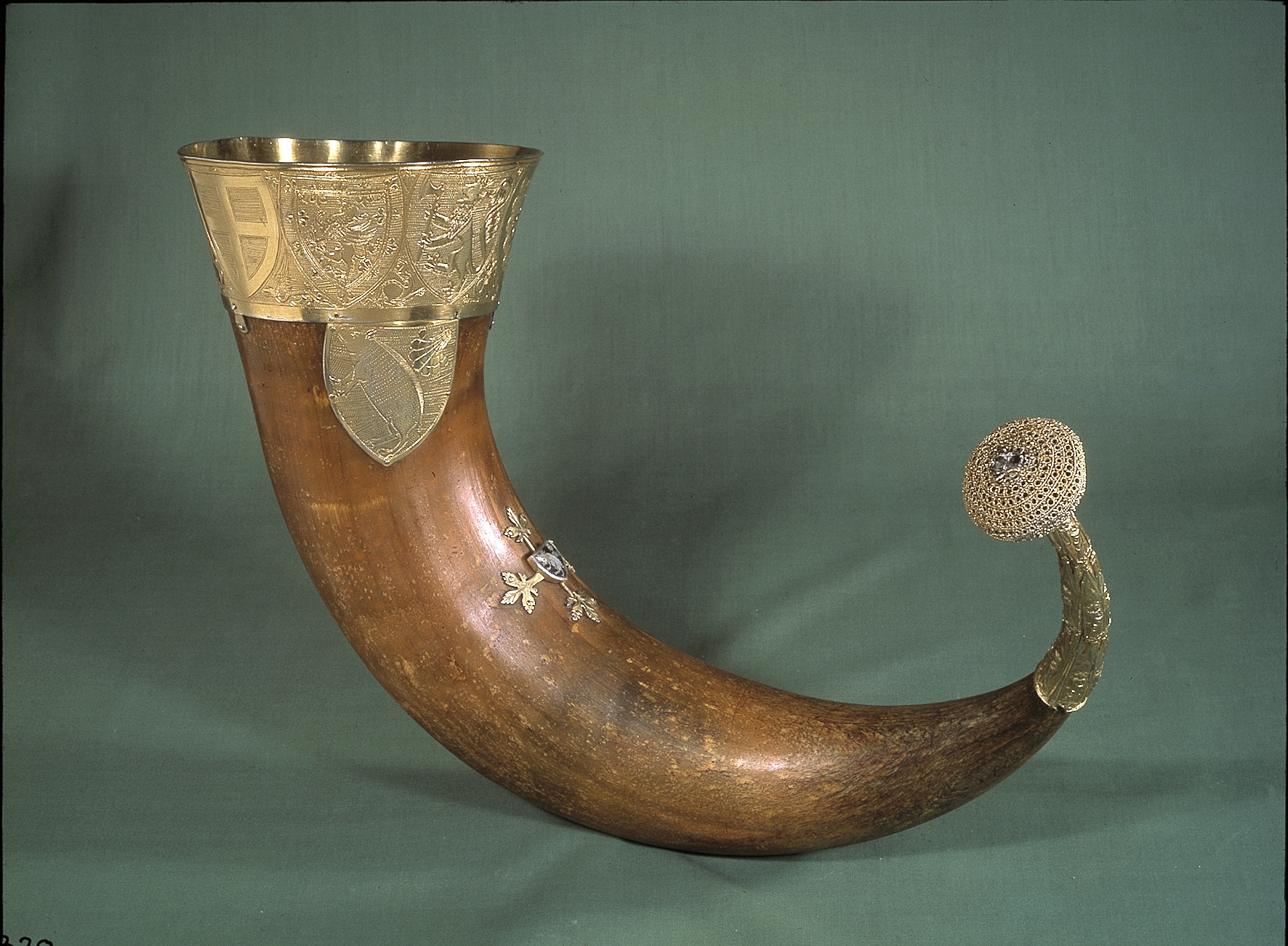
On the Norwegian "Kongshornet" (the King's Horn) the coat of arms of the old clan Galte can be seen before the family became "Galtung" in the era of Danish superiority over Norway. This horn remains in a Danish collection at Copenhagen, which has refused Norway's request to return it. The coat of arms would have been a gold or silver (in the sagas "radiant") boar representing Ynglinga on a blue shield with a shell for the sea or Christian pilgrimage.

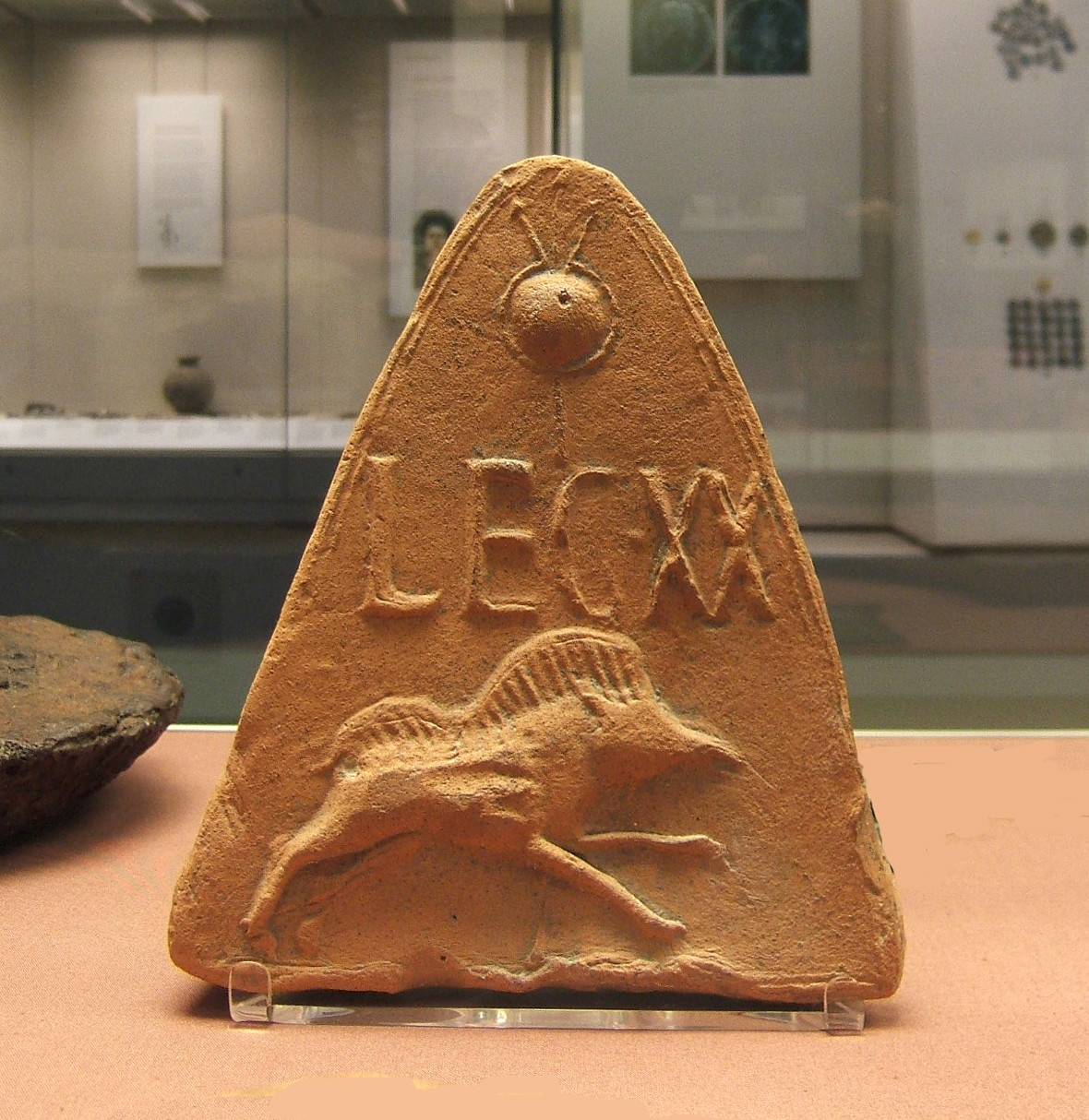
A Roman Antefix roof tile showing the Twentieth Legion's boar badge and standard

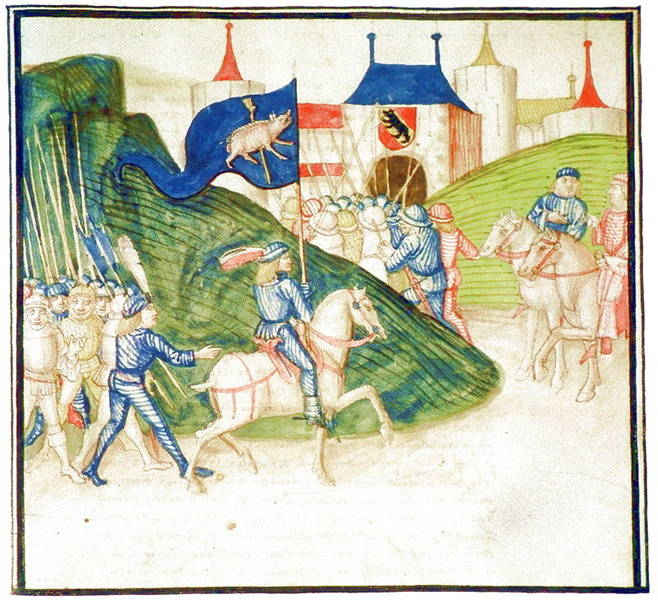
The Swiss Saubanner as depicted in the Berner Schilling (1480s)

Arms of Malacky, Slovakia

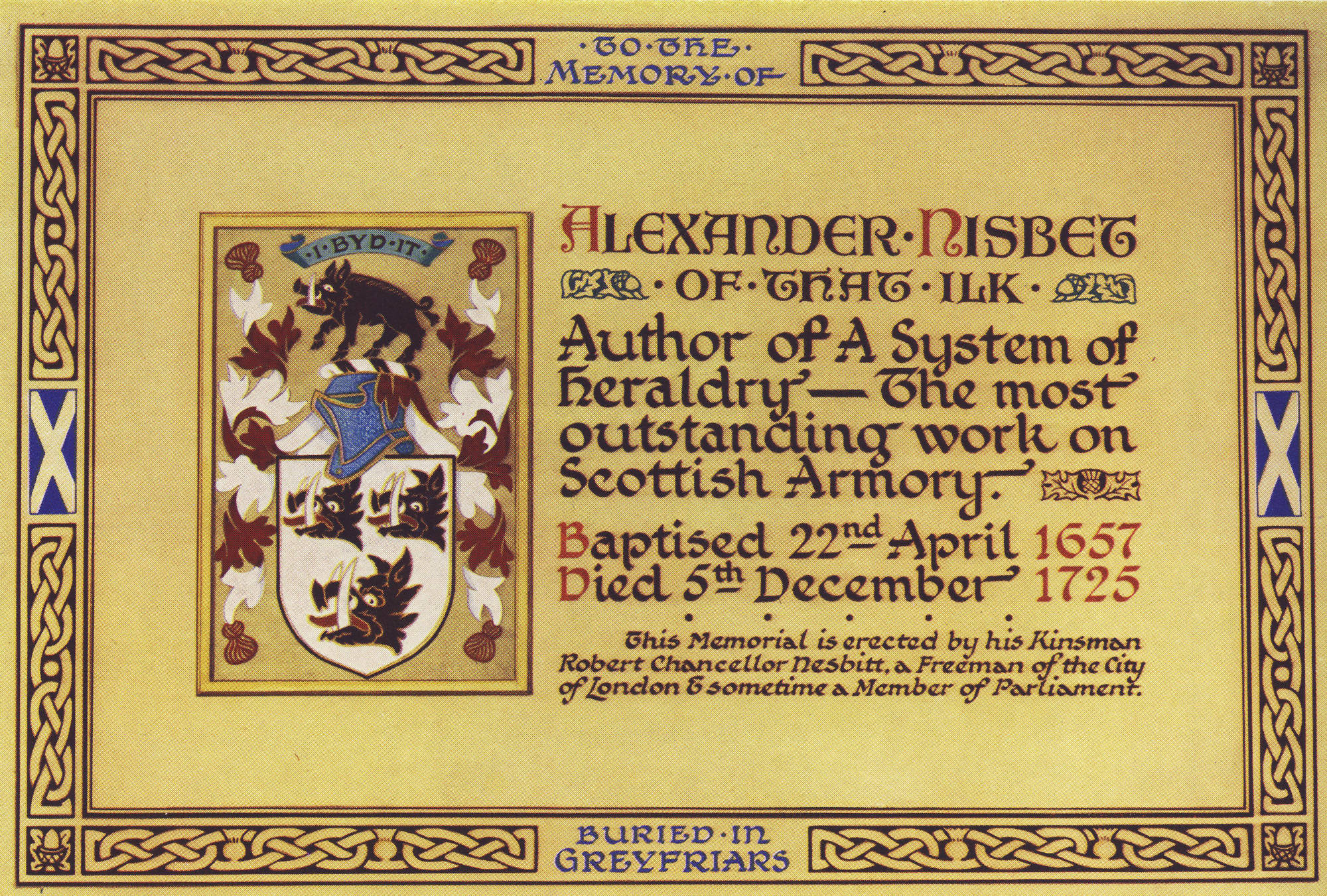
Heraldic boars on Alexander Nisbet's memorial in Greyfriars Kirk, Edinburgh.

The wild boar and boar's head are common charges in heraldry.

== Early history ==
The boar was used as an emblem in some instances during antiquity and the Early Middle Ages (i.e. predating the development of classical European heraldry). During the Roman Empire, at least three legions are known to have used a boar as their emblems – Legio I Italica, Legio X Fretensis and Legio XX Valeria Victrix. The Knocknagael Boar Stone is a well-known Pictish stone with a depiction of a boar emblem dating to circa the 7th century. In this context, the name of Orkney is interpreted as being derived from orc-, the Celtic for "pig", presumably from a Pictish tribe which displayed a boar or wild pig as their emblem. The boar also appears as an emblem for Germanic tribes during the Anglo-Saxon and Vendel periods and the Viking Age. This is reflected in the boar helmets worn in battle, attested in archaeological records and both Old English and Old Norse written sources. The boar is closely associated with Freyr and has also been proposed to be a totemic animal to the Swedes, in particular the Yngling royal dynasty who ruled at a cultic centre for the god.

The Fergusson baronets of Nova Scotia display as their arms three gold boars on a blue shield with a silver buckle in the center. Three royal Irish chieftains originally came to Scotland from Ireland and became the Kings of Dál Riata – they battled and married into the Picts uniting Scotland and are considered to be the first Scottish kings. The three brothers established separate Ferguson clans in different regions of Scotland and display different arms having three boars in common.

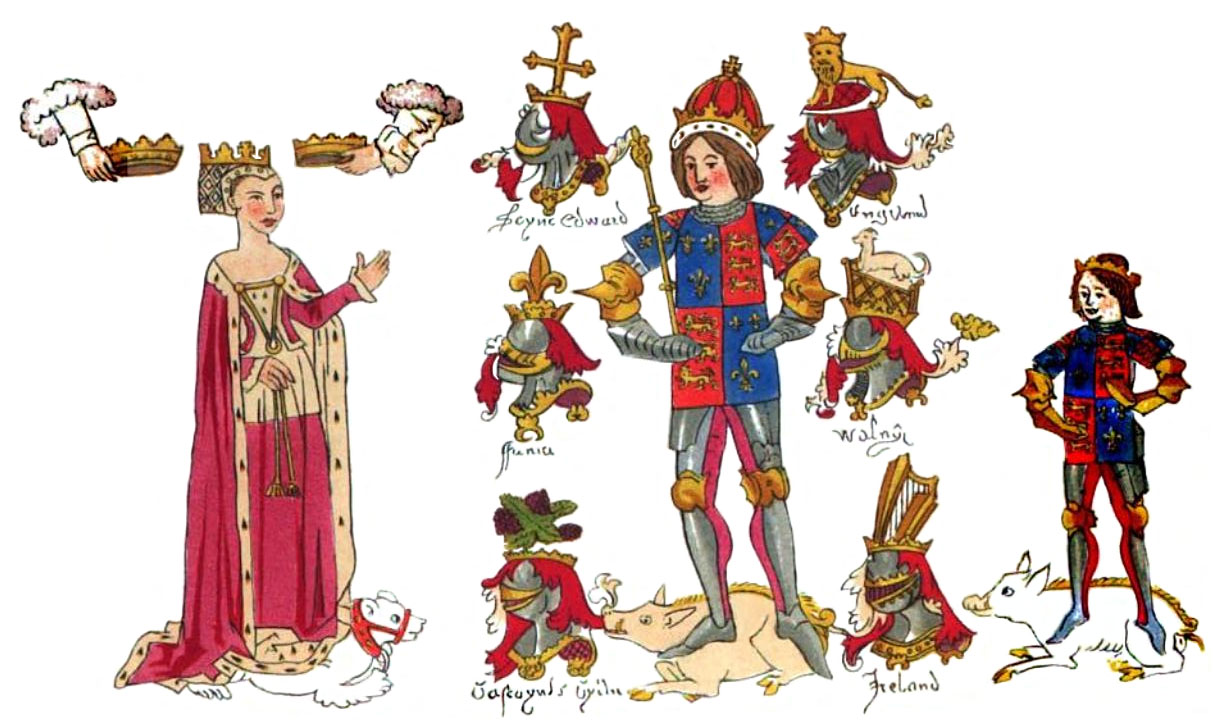
The Rous Roll illustrating King Richard III in the centre with his wife Lady Anne Neville on the left and their son Edward, Prince of Wales on the right, detailing his various heraldic devices (representing St Edward the Confessor, England, Wales, France, Ireland etc.) and his white boar badge with the Warwick bear of his wife's family.

With the development of heraldry in the late Middle Ages, the boar makes an appearance as the White Boar, a personal device of Richard III of England used as his livery badges.

In the 15th century, a coat of arms of "Triballia", depicting a wild boar with an arrow piercing its head, was dislayed as the supposed arms of Emperor Stefan Dušan (r. 1331–1355). The device had, in 1415, been used as the coat of arms of the Serbian Despotate and is used in one of Stefan Lazarević's personal seals, according to the paper Сабор у Констанци. Pavao Ritter Vitezović also depicts "Triballia" with the same emblem in 1701 and Hristofor Žefarović again in 1741. During the First Serbian Uprising (1804–1813), in 1805 the Parliament adopted the coat of arms of Serbia. Its official seal depicted the heraldic emblems of Serbia and Triballia.

The Buzic noble family of Bohemia used a boar's head as heraldic device from the 14th century, later (as Zajíc) combined with a hare.

== Early modern heraldry ==
Arms of HM Queen Camilla

In the early modern period, use of a boar's head (rather than the entire animal) became popular as a heraldic device. Siebmachers Wappenbuch (1605) shows a boar in the coat of arms of the noble von Schweinichen family.

Boars, in whole or in part, feature frequently in British heraldry. While a distinction is sometimes made between the wild animal, termed the wild boar or sanglier, and the male domestic pig, termed simply the boar, these are not depicted differently from one another in heraldic art. The boar's head is a common charge, and in English heraldry is traditionally shown attached to its neck. In Scottish and Welsh heraldry, however, it cut off from behind the ears. In the first case, the boar's head is described as being couped or erased at the neck, while in the latter it is couped or erased close.

Archbishop Booth's arms

The ancient Cheshire Booth family, of which a scion was Laurence Booth, Archbishop of York, and whose descendants became baronets and Earls of Warrington, display arms blazoned Argent three Boars' Heads erect erased Sable.

Queen Camilla's marital arms feature a rampant wild boar with a chained crown around its neck, supporting the shield to the sinister and the head of a boar on her paternal (Shand) family shield.

In modern times, a boar's head has been used in French heraldry such as in the arms of Joseph Bonaparte and Joachim Murat.

Arms of Joseph Bonaparte as King of Naples

=== Family coats of arms ===
In Ireland, boars feature in many coats of arms of the noble families. Three boars are seen on coats of arms of Lockhart, Grimsby, and Oglethorpe. In addition, the Sullivan-Mor arms display a boar, and those of Sullivan-Ber have two. The O'Deorain (Doran) arms, an offshoot of the Sullivans, feature a boar, the Rogans' display a boar crossing a hilltop and Baroness Healy's patrilineal family use three boars' heads. The Purcells of Loughmoe's coat of arms features four black boars' heads. The McCanns display a boar as too do the Crowleys whose arms feature a blue boar surrounded by three red crosses. The Cassidy coat of arms features a white boar in base. The O’Hanlon displayed a boar as the Standard Bearer for Orior (in present-day Ulster). Some Irish Keating families have been granted arms comprising a boar going through a holly bush alluding to courage.

In Scotland, a boar's head is the crest of Clan MacTavish, Clan Campbell, and Clan Innes. It appears in both the coat of arms and crest of Clan Chisholm. Three boars' heads are depicted in the coats of arms of the related clans of Swinton, Gordon, Nesbitt and Urquhart, as well as those of the unrelated Lord Bannerman of Kildonan.

In Northern Spain and Latin America, the coats of arms of noble families such as Garmendia, Urraga, Urrutia, Urieta and Urmeneta all depict a boar; boars, wolves and bears are common charges in Basque heraldry, especially from Guipuzcoa.

=== Cities and towns ===
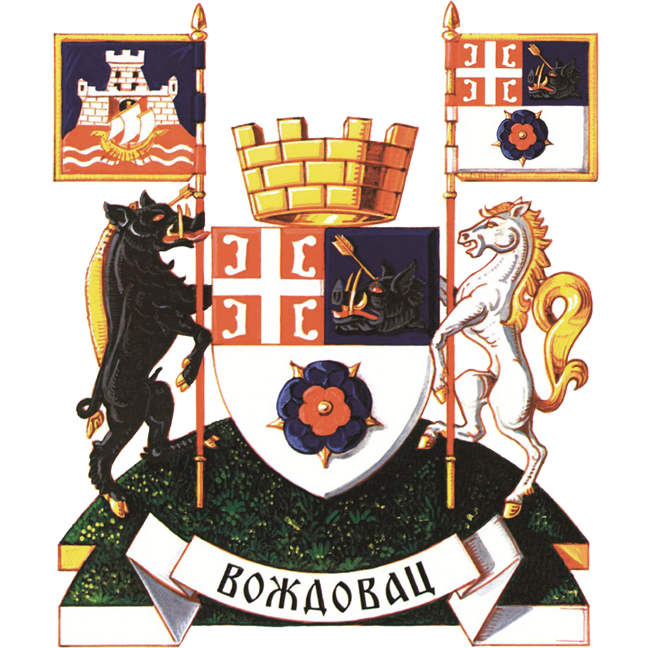
A Serbian Triballi boar as a supporter in the arms of Voždovac

Boar charges are also often used in canting (heraldic punning). The German towns of Eberbach and Ebersbach an der Fils, both in Baden-Württemberg, and Ebersbach, Saxony use civic arms that demonstrates this. Each depicts a boar – Eber in German (and in two cases a wavy fess or bars meant to represent a brook – Bach in German).

Albano Laziale in Italy is near where, according to legend, Aeneas's son Ascanius founded Alba Longa; the city's modern arms sport the white boar (Latin: Alba) dreamt by Ascanius before founding the city. Malacky in Slovakia also has a coat of arms with a wild boar. The name of the city, which was first mentioned in writing in 1206, refers to the word "Malacka" which means "piglet" in the Hungarian (Magyar) language. In the East Flanders province of Belgium, the municipality of Evergem, literally "boar's estate" in Dutch, features a boar on a gold field.

In Belgium, the Flemish municipalities of Vorselaar in the Antwerp Province and Zaventem in the Flemish Brabant province prominently feature boars.

In Serbia, the municipalities and cities of Barajevo, Kragujevac, Lapovo, Lajkovac, Topola, Velika Plana, and Voždovac display the Triballian boar on their heraldic shields or as supporters.

=== Military and paramilitary badges ===
A wild boar in the canting arms of Eberbach, Germany (1976 design)

In various armorials, the Serbian coat of arms has featured the pierced head of a wild boar, also known as the coat of arms of Triballia. The banner of the Serbian revolutionary forces during the First Serbian Uprising also featured a boar together with the Serbian cross.

The Lorne Scots, a Canadian Army Infantry Regiment, has adopted the boar's head as its heraldic emblem due to their affiliation with Clan Campbell.

In Belgium, the wild boar is the symbolic animal of the Ardennes Forest in the south, and is the mascot of one of the Belgian Army's premier infantry regiments, the Régiment de Chasseurs Ardennais, whose soldiers wear the boar's head as a cap badge.

== See also ==
- White boar
- Wild boar
