= Spiezer Schilling =

1480s chronicle by Diebold Schilling the Elder

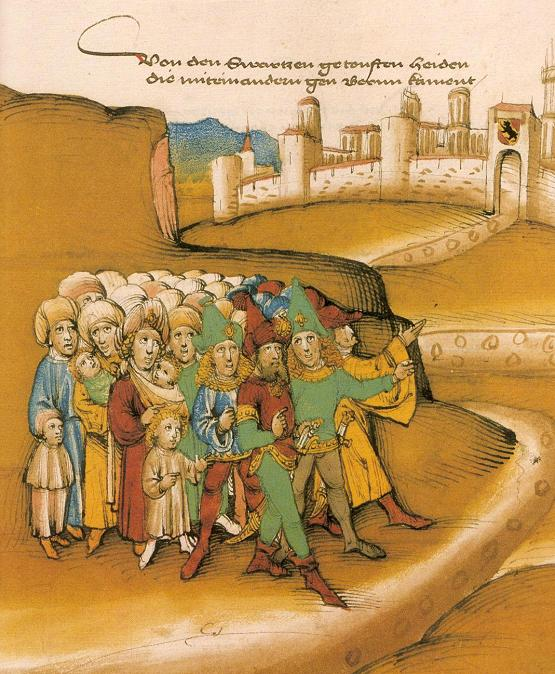
- First arrival of Gypsies outside Bern, described as getoufte heiden "baptized heathens" (p. 749)
- Author: Diebold Schilling the Elder
- Original title: Spiezer Chronik
- Genre: Chronicle
- Publication date: 1480s

Spiezer Schilling or Spiezer Chronik is a chronicle by Diebold Schilling the Elder of Bern (1480s), created after the Berner Schilling by the same author.

== See also ==
- Swiss illustrated chronicles
