= Swiss illustrated chronicles =

Manuscript works of Swiss history, 1423–1631

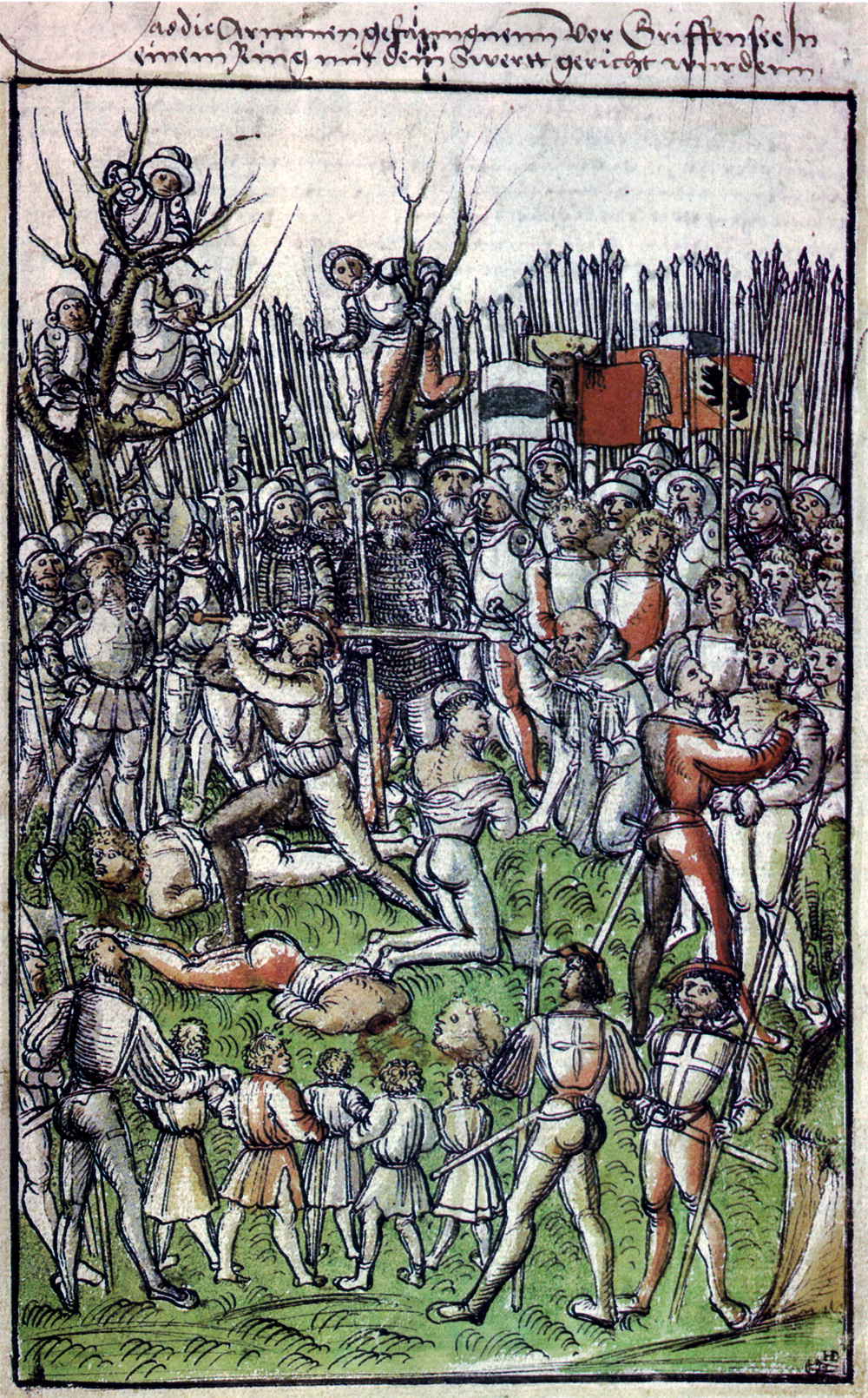
Execution of the defenders of Greifensee during the Old Zürich War 1444, from Schodeler's chronicle, ca. 1515

Several illustrated chronicles were created in the Old Swiss Confederacy in the 15th and 16th centuries. They were luxurious illuminated manuscripts produced for the urban elite of Bern and Lucerne, and their copious detailed illustrations allow a unique insight into the politics and daily life of late medieval Switzerland on the eve of the Reformation. The most important of these chronicles are the works of the two Diebold Schillings, their luxurious execution, as well as their content reflecting the growing confidence and self-esteem of the leaders of the confederacy after their spectacular successes in the Burgundian Wars.

- 1423 Konrad Justinger's chronicle (Bern) the original was lost, but a copy of the text survives in Jena.
- 1470 the "Tschachtlanchronik" by Bendicht Tschachtlan und Heinrich Dittlinger (Bern, now kept in Zürich)
- Diebold Schilling the Elder, Bern:
  - 1483 the "Berner Schilling", three volumes, covering the time from the foundation of Bern up to and including the Burgundy Wars.
  - 1480s "Spiezer Schilling", a shorter one-volume edition
  - 1484 "Zürcher Schilling" (kept in Zürich; used by Gerold Edlibach for his chronicle of 1486)
- Diebold Schilling the Younger, nephew of Diebold Schilling the Elder:
  - 1515 "Luzerner Schilling"
- 1515 Chronicle of Wernher Schodeler of Bremgarten.
- 1529–1546 Berner Chronik of Valerius Anshelm.
- 1576 Christoph Silberysen's compendium.
- 1587 "Wickiana" by Johann Jakob Wick, a compilation of various manuscripts and prints.
- 1626–1631 Schweitzer-Chronic by Michael Stettler of Bern.

== See also ==
- Toggenburg Bible
