= Gerold Edlibach =

Swiss historian (1454–1530)

Gerold Edlibach (24 September 1454 – 28 August 1530) was a Swiss chronicler and official of Zurich, author of the Zürcher Chronik.

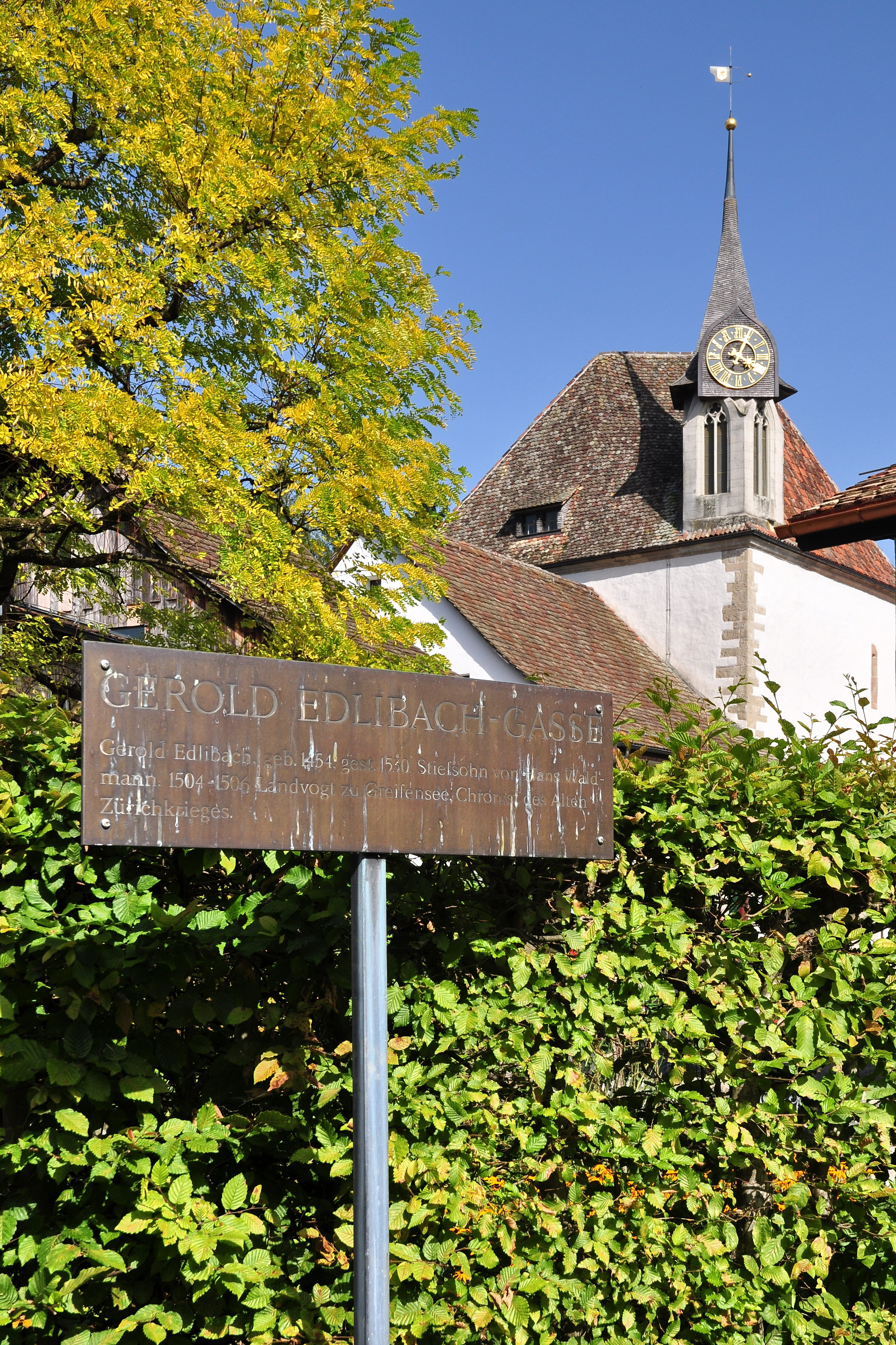
Gerold Edlibach lane in Greifensee, Zürich, the Greifensee Reformed Church in the background

He was born to Ulrich Edlibach and Anna Landolt of Einsiedeln. His mother was from a wealthy family of ironmongers, who after her first husband's death married the mayor of Zurich, Hans Waldmann. Gerold Edlibach married Ursula Röist, with whom he had a total of 18 children. He was employed by the Einsiedeln Abbey to manage its property in the city of Zurich during 1473 to 1480. He was elected to the city council in 1487, but he was forced to retire after the execution of his step-father in 1489. He sat in the council again during 1493 to 1499 and during 1515 to 1524. He acted as a reeve for the city in Bülach in 1488, in Grüningen during 1494 to 1498 and in Greifensee, Zürich from 1505 to 1507. As an opponent of the Reformation in Zürich led by Ulrich Zwingli, he opted to retire from all offices in 1524.

His main work is the Zürcher Chronik which documents the history of the Old Swiss Confederacy from 1431 to 1530. The portion covering the time up to 1486 is partly based on the illustrated chronicle by Diebold Schilling the Elder. Edlibach extended the 1486 work adding his own account of contemporary events until his death in 1530, although entries become noticeably briefer after 1517. The manuscript is kept at the Zurich Central Library

Edlibach also published a Zürcher Wappenbuch in the 1480s, an account of the Waldmann scandal of 1489 (Waldmannscher Auflauf) and a glossary of Rotwelsch (fickabel des rotwelschtz) in 1490, besides various notes on the Reformation during 1520 to 1527.
