= Stanser Verkommnis =

Treaty of Stans
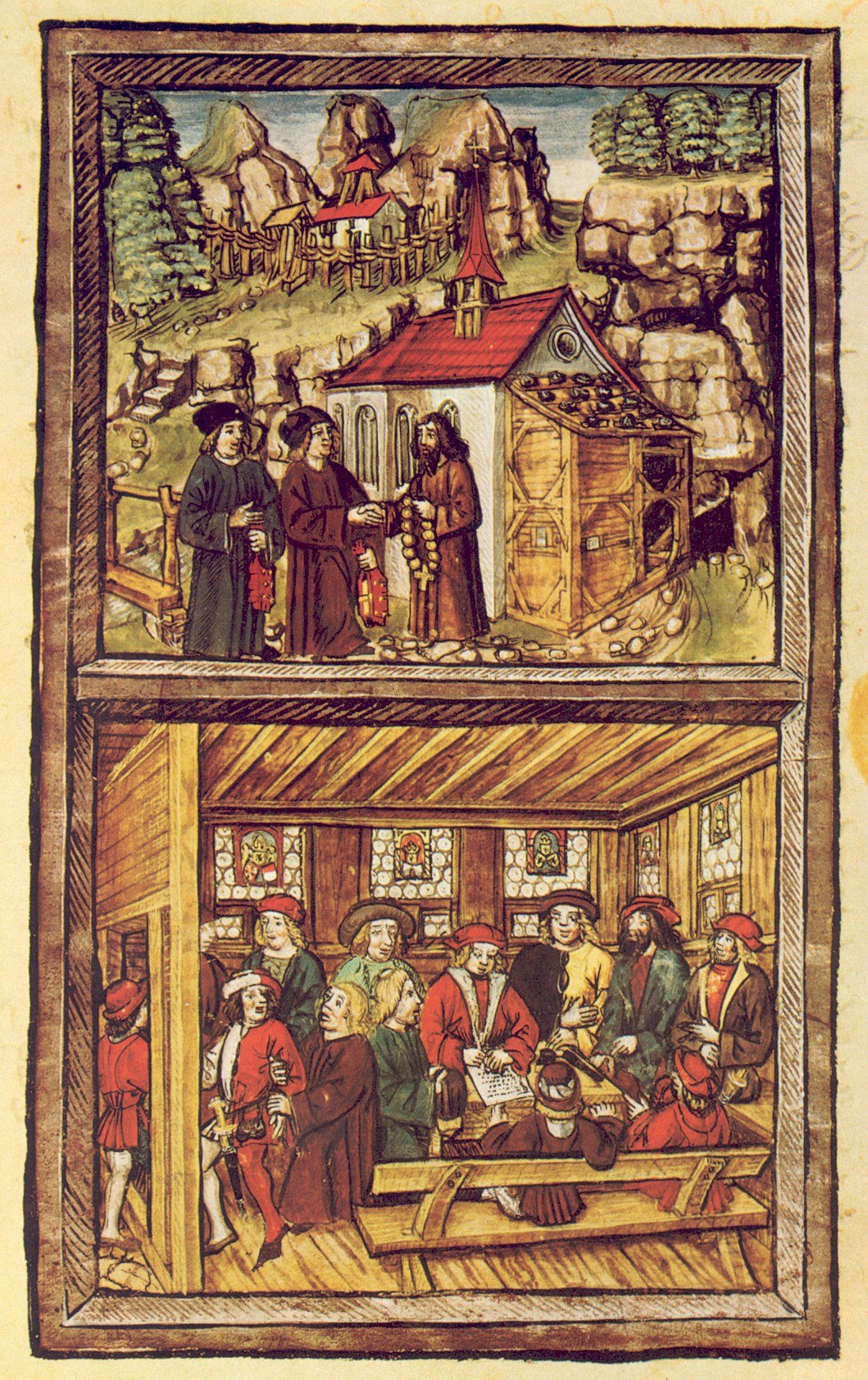
- Niklaus von Flüe counsels Heini Amgrund (top panel), which leads to a compromise resolution in Stans (bottom panel), illustration in the Luzerner Schilling of 1513
- Type: Eidgenossenschaft
- Signed: 1481
- Location: Stans, Nidwalden, Old Swiss Confederacy
- Signatories: Bern; Fribourg; Glarus; Lucerne; Schwyz; Solothurn; (Canton of Solothurn) Unterwalden; Uri; Zug; Zürich
- Language: German

In the Stanser Verkommnis (English: Treaty of Stans) of 1481 the Tagsatzung solved the latent conflict between the rural and urban cantons of the Old Swiss Confederacy, averting the breaking of the Confederacy, and triggering its further expansion from 8 to 13 members until 1513.

The tensions between the cantons had arisen in the wake of the Burgundy Wars, among other things due to disagreement over the distribution of spoils which culminated in the Saubannerzug.

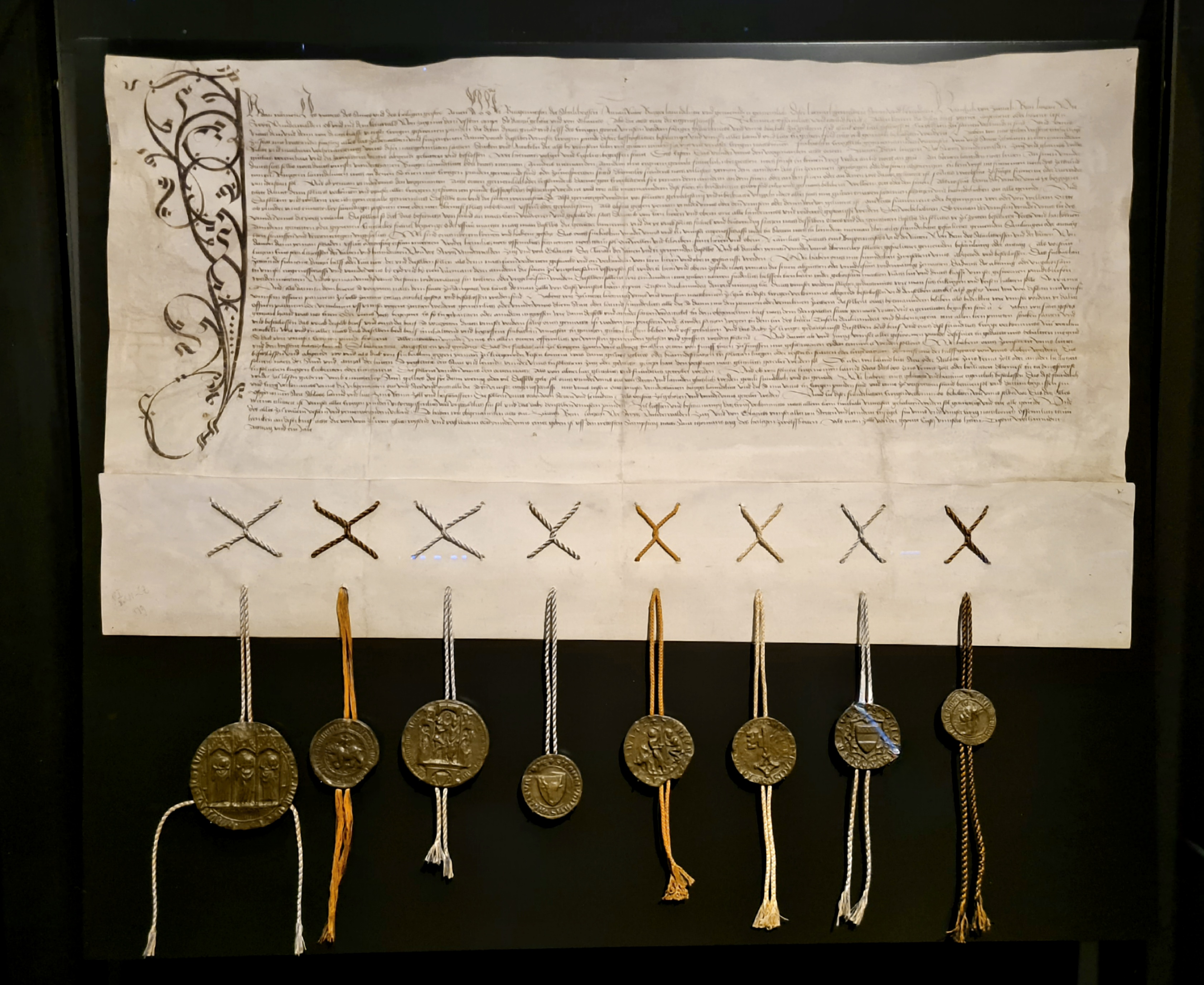
Facsimile edition of the treaty in Landesmuseum Zürich

According to Diebold Schilling the Younger, who was present at the session of the Tagsatzung, the conflict was resolved as on 22 December the pastor of Stans, Heini Amgrund, brought a message from the hermit Niklaus von Flüe. Upon reception of the message, the quarrels were laid aside. The content of the message is unknown.

The compromise solution entailed the accession of Fribourg and Solothurn as full members of the Confederacy.

== See also ==
- Amstalden affair
