= Peter von Hagenbach =

German military and civil commander (1420–1474)

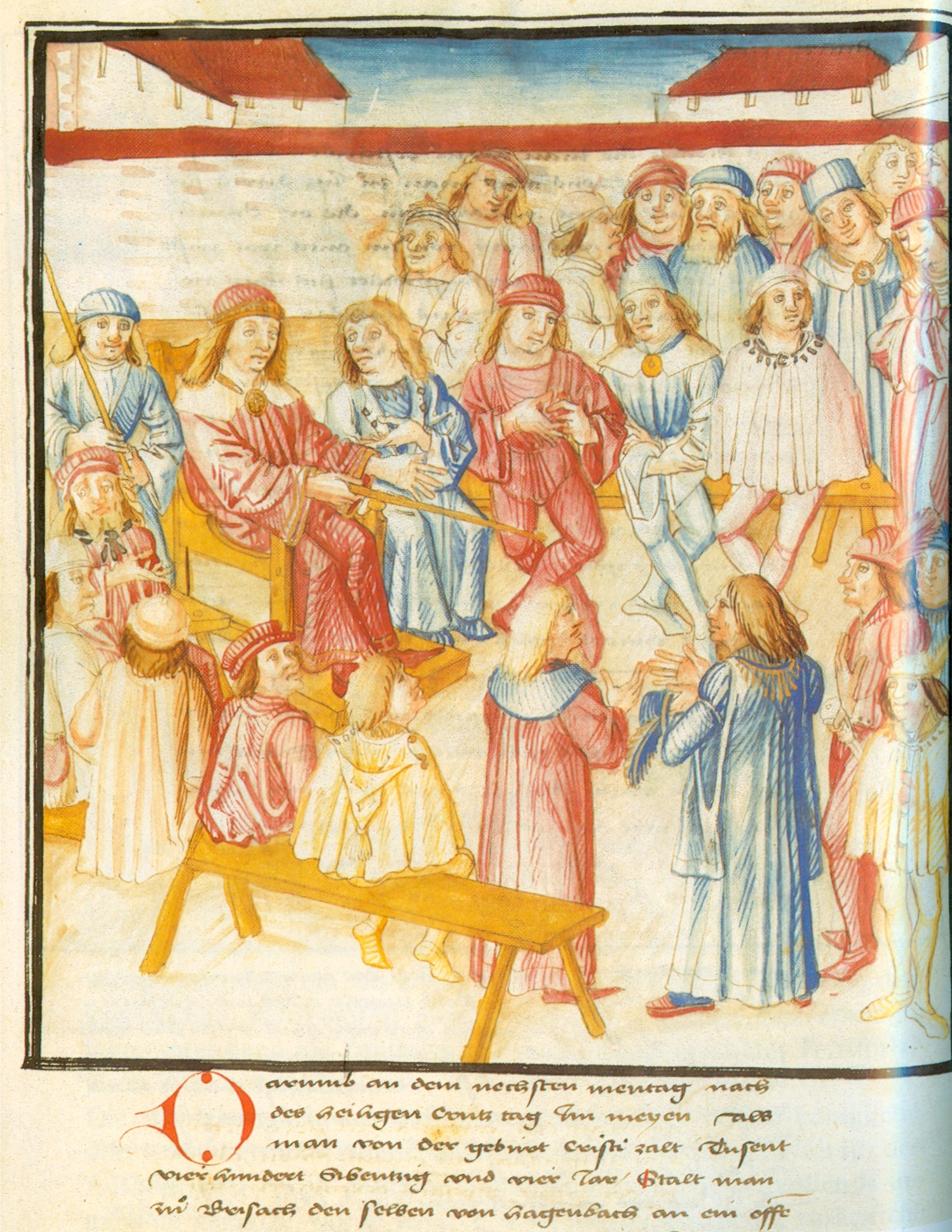
Hagenbach on trial, from Berner Chronik des Diebold Schilling dem Älteren

Coat of arms of Hagenbach

Peter von Hagenbach (c. 1420 – May 9, 1474), also Pierre de Hagenbach, Pietro di Hagenbach, Pierre d'Archambaud, or Pierre d'Aquenbacq, was a Burgundian knight from Alsace, a German military and civil commander, and a convicted war criminal. In 1474, Hagenbach was tried for war crimes, specifically for rapes and murders committed by his soldiers during a military occupation of Breisach. He was found guilty and executed on May 9th. The trial of Hagenbach was the first known trial of a war crime in history.

== Biography ==
Hagenbach was born into an Alsatian-Burgundian family, originally from Hagenbach, where they owned a castle. He was instated as bailiff of Upper Alsace by Charles the Bold, Duke of Burgundy, to administer the territories and rights on the Upper Rhine which had been mortgaged by Duke Sigmund of Further Austria for 50,000 florins in the Treaty of St. Omer in 1469. There he coined the term Landsknecht—from German, Land ("land, country") + Knecht ("servant"). It was originally intended to indicate soldiers of the lowlands of the Holy Roman Empire as opposed to the Swiss mercenaries. As early as 1500 the misleading spelling Lanzknecht became common because of the phonetic and visual similarity between Land(e)s ("of the land/territory") and Lanze ("lance").

Over the span of five years of his governance, Hagenbach alienated his Alsatian subjects; antagonized the neighbouring Swiss Confederacy, who felt threatened by his rule; and showed aggressive intentions towards the city of Mulhouse. As a result, the Swiss sought alliances with German towns and Louis XI. By February 1473, a handful of free cities had combined to end Burgundian rule in Alsace.

The cities of Strasbourg, Colmar, Basel, and Sélestat offered money to Sigismund of Austria to buy back Alsace from Charles; but Charles was determined to keep it and refused to sell. To emphasize his claim, Charles toured the province around Christmas 1473, reportedly with an army. He tried to make peace with the Swiss, who questioned his sincerity. Charles's threats prompted the Swiss to ally themselves with their former enemy, Sigismund.

In April 1474, the rebelling Alsatian cities and the Swiss formed the League of Constance to drive Charles and Peter von Hagenbach from Alsace, and rebellion quickly broke out. Hagenbach was put on trial for the atrocities committed during the occupation of Breisach. His trial, which was held by an ad hoc tribunal of the Holy Roman Empire in 1474, was the first "international" recognition of commanders' obligations to act lawfully. He was convicted of crimes, specifically murder, war rape, and perjury, among other crimes, that "he as a knight was deemed to have a duty to prevent". He defended himself by arguing that he was only following orders from the Duke of Burgundy, to whom the Holy Roman Empire had given Breisach. The ad hoc tribunal, however, refused to accept this as a defense. Hagenbach was found guilty of murder, rape, and perjury, and was beheaded at Breisach.

== Legacy ==
Upon hearing the news of the rebellion, Charles the Bold was enraged. In August 1474, he sent an army led by Peter's brother, Stefan von Hagenbach, into Alsace. After Charles refused again to give up control of Alsace, the League of Constance officially declared war on him. Hagenbach's death might be considered the catalyst to the conflict now called the "Burgundian Wars".

Although there was no explicit use of a doctrine of command responsibility, it is seen as the first trial based on that principle. It also includes the earliest documented prosecution of sexually-based/targeted crimes before an international tribunal when he was convicted for rapes committed by his troops. More recently, the trial of Peter von Hagenbach has been cited to argue against ongoing efforts in modern Australia seeking the retrial or posthumous pardon of convicted Boer War criminals Breaker Morant, Peter Handcock, George Witton, and Henry Picton.

== See also ==
- Burgundian Wars
