= Zürcher Schilling =

Medieval chronicle on the Burgundian Wars

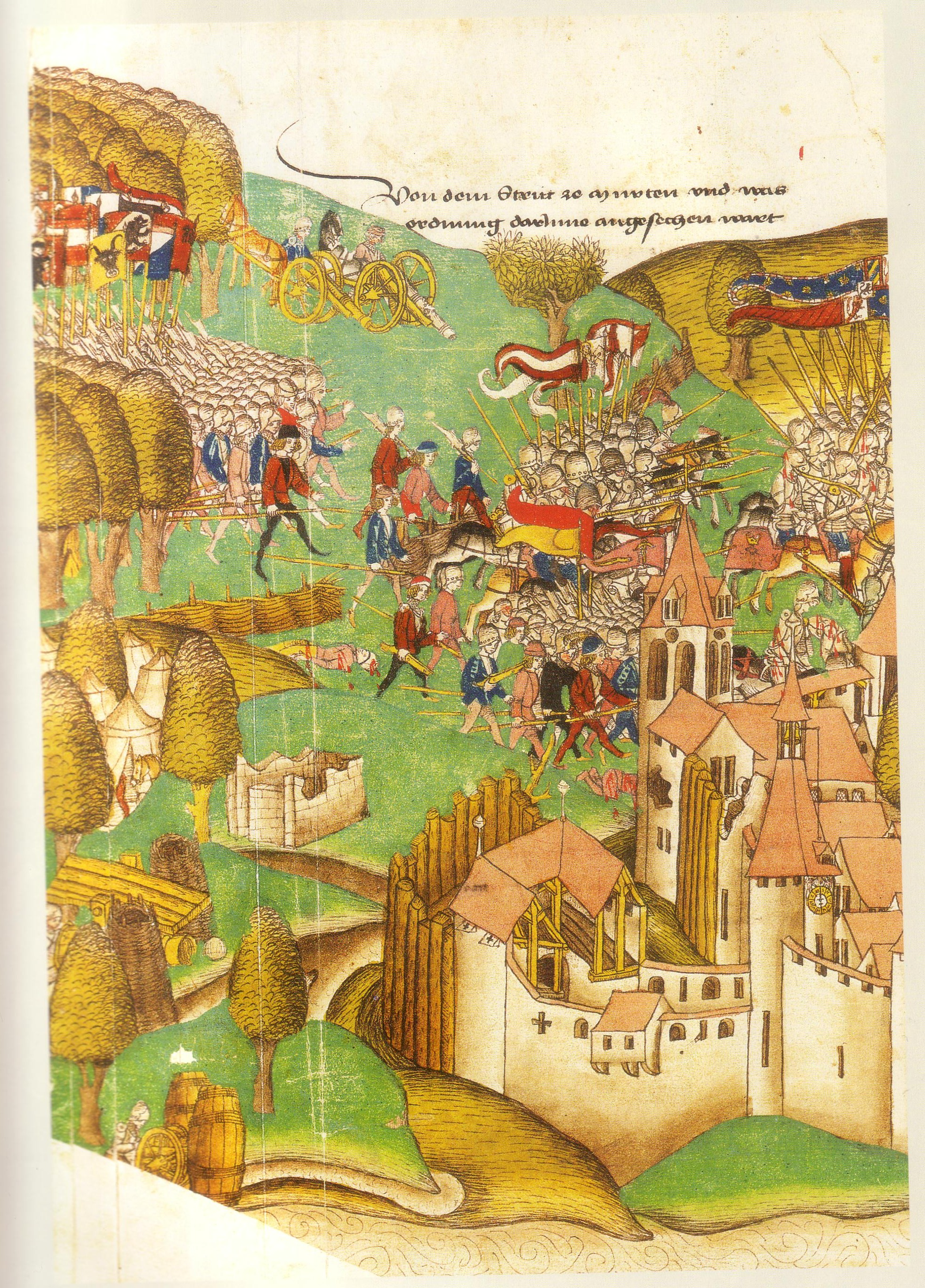
Zürcher Schilling

Zürcher Schilling (or Grosse Burgunderchronik, Great Burgundy Chronicle) is the latest-written chronicle by the I Thor Diebold Schilling the Elder of Bern (1484). The chronicle describes the Burgundian Wars. It is kept in the central library in Zürich.

== See also ==
- Swiss illustrated chronicles
