= Hagenbach, Haut-Rhin =

Commune in Grand Est, France

Hagenbach
- Commune
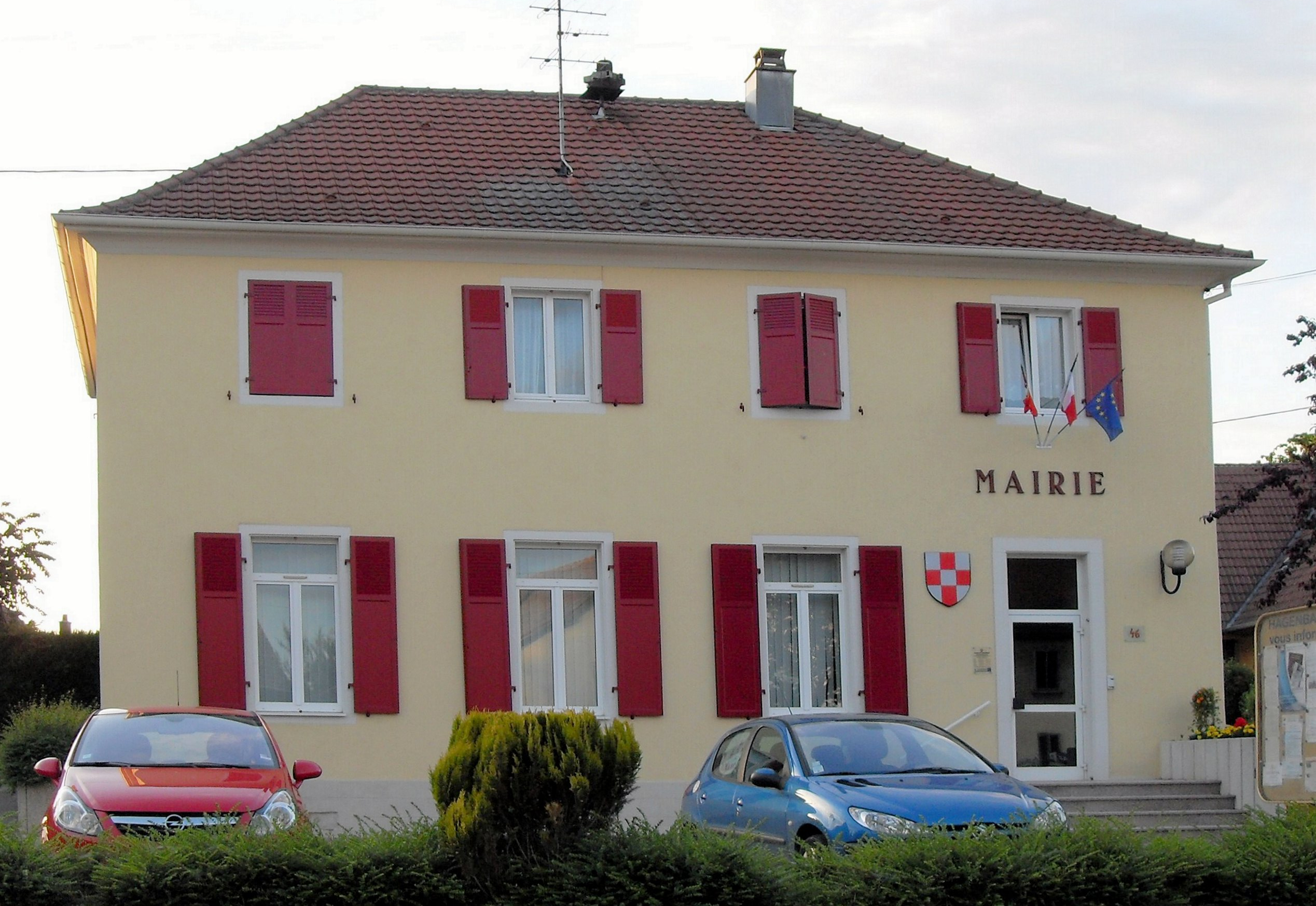
- The town hall in Hagenbach

- Coat of arms
- Location of Hagenbach
- Location within France Location within Grand Est
- Coordinates: 47°39′04″N 7°09′26″E
- Country: France
- Region: Grand Est
- Department: Haut-Rhin
- Arrondissement: Altkirch
- Canton: Masevaux-Niederbruck

Government
  - Mayor (2020–2026): Guy Bach
- Area^{1}: 4.81 km^{2} (1.86 sq mi)
- Elevation: 285 m (935 ft)
- Highest elevation: 343 m (1,125 ft)
- Lowest elevation: 279 m (915 ft)
- Population (2023): 772
  - Density: 160/km^{2} (416/sq mi)
- Time zone: UTC+01:00 (CET)
  - Summer (DST): UTC+02:00 (CEST)
- INSEE/Postal code: 68119 /68210
- ^{1} French Land Register data, which excludes lakes, ponds, glaciers > 1 km^{2} (0.386 sq mi or 247 acres) and river estuaries.

Hagenbach (French pronunciation: [aɡənbak]) is a commune in the Haut-Rhin department in Alsace in north-eastern France.

== See also ==
- Communes of the Haut-Rhin département
- Peter von Hagenbach
