= Tschachtlanchronik =

1470 Swiss illustrated chronicle

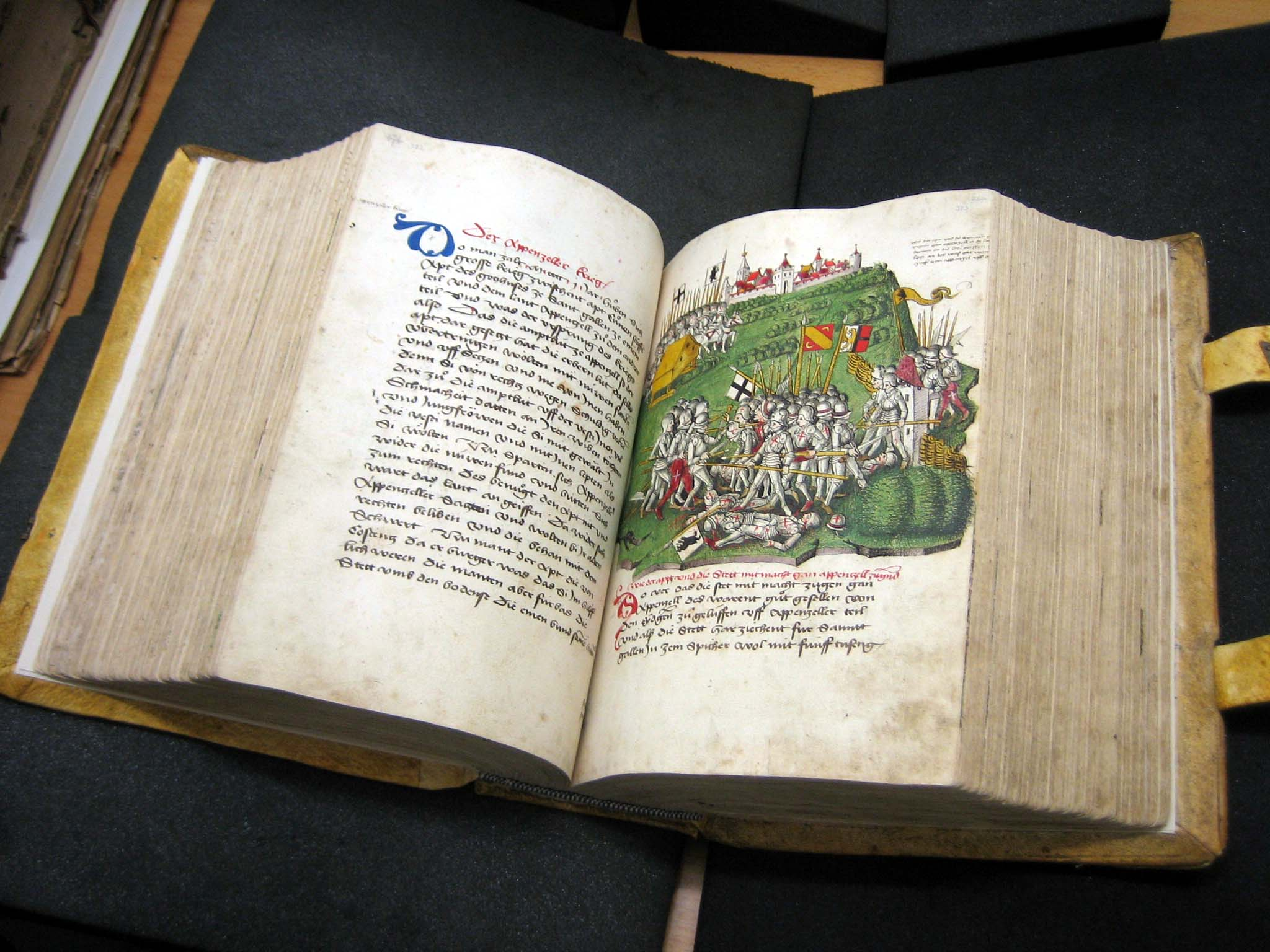
The Tschachtlanchronik

The Tschachtlanchronik of 1470 is the oldest of the still existing Swiss illustrated chronicles, compiled by Bendicht Tschachtlan (c. 1420-1493) and Heinrich Dittlinger (c. 1440-1479) of Bern. The chronicle is now kept in Zentralbibliothek Zürich, where a facsimile can be viewed.

It consists of a paper manuscript with around 1000 pages, containing 230 coloured illustrations. Two hundred of the illustrations show war scenes; the remaining show everyday life, both rural and in towns, and also scenes in the royal court. In the epilogue, the two authors declare that the work was finished in 1470.
