= Schilling of Solothurn =

Family of Swiss chroniclers

The family of the two Swiss chroniclers called Diebold Schilling was originally from Solothurn. The elder Diebold Schilling wrote the Great Burgundian Chronicle.

Klewi Schilling was a somewhat dubious character, and he was banned from the city, settling in Hagenau (Alsace), and probably died in Kaysersberg.

His eldest son Hans worked as a scribe in the publishing house of Diebold Lauber in Hagenau. Klewi's younger son, Diebold Schilling the Elder worked in Lucerne as a chancellor.

In 1460, Diebold moved to Bern for a post as a scribe to the city council, and Hans moved to Lucerne to take over the post vacated by his brother.

The Bern Council commissioned Diebold the elder to write the Great Burgundian Chronicle, which he wrote and published in three volumes between 1474 and 1483. The Chronicle was notable for its prose discussion of the details of life, and Bern's role in the Burgundian Wars.

Hans took after his father and went adventuring, visiting the court of Matthias Corvinus in Vienna together with the chronicler Melchior Russ in 1488 from where they both returned destitute.

Hans' son, Diebold Schilling the Younger, was also something of a bohemian, and spent at least two years imprisoned for misdemeanour and for providing refuge for criminals.

== See also ==
- Swiss illustrated chronicles.
