= Treaty of Saint-Omer =

1469 Treaty that marked the beginning of the Burgundian Wars

In the Treaty of Saint-Omer, Archduke Sigismund of Habsburg mortgaged the County of Ferrette along with the Landgraviate of Upper Alsace to Duke Charles the Bold, in Saint-Omer (Pas-de-Calais) on 9 May 1469. The treaty laid the foundation for the Burgundian Wars.

== Historical context ==
Sigismund had been looking for some time for an ally capable of helping him to control the expansionist aims of the Swiss Confederates, carried out for the moment at the expense of his territories. Having sought the support of King Louis XI and having suffered a shrewd refusal on his part, he turned to his rival, Charles the Bold.

The treaty mortgaged the Habsburg territories of Upper Alsace, Breisach, the County of Ferrette, the County of Hauenstein, the Lordship of Ortenberg and the four Rhenish towns of Rheinfelden, Säckingen, Laufenburg and Waldshut with their hinterland in the Black Forest to the Duke of Burgundy. These were to be held by Charles against the payment of a sum of 50,000 florins. The treaty also provided for a defensive alliance.

== Consequences of the Treaty of Saint-Omer ==
The treaty gave Burgundy access to the Rhine and made Charles the Bold, an immediate neighbour of the Swiss.

The management of these territories by the representative of the Duke of Burgundy, the bailiff Peter von Hagenbach, the economic consequences and the loss of the privileges which resulted from it for the Alsatian cities and the Swiss allied cities, seeded a revolt in the territories of Upper Rhine.

On the other hand, Louis XI never ceased plotting against his rival, Charles the Bold, and in time he skillfully rallied to his cause and against the Duke the Alsatian towns, the Confederates and René II, Duke of Lorraine.

This permanent state of military confrontation led to the Battle of Héricourt on 13 November 1474, the first major defeat for the troops of Charles the Bold, a defeat that marked the beginning of the end for the Duke himself and the disappearance of the Duchy of Burgundy in favour of the King of France, Louis XI. (see Treaty of Arras)
