= Diebold Schilling the Younger =

Swiss chronicler

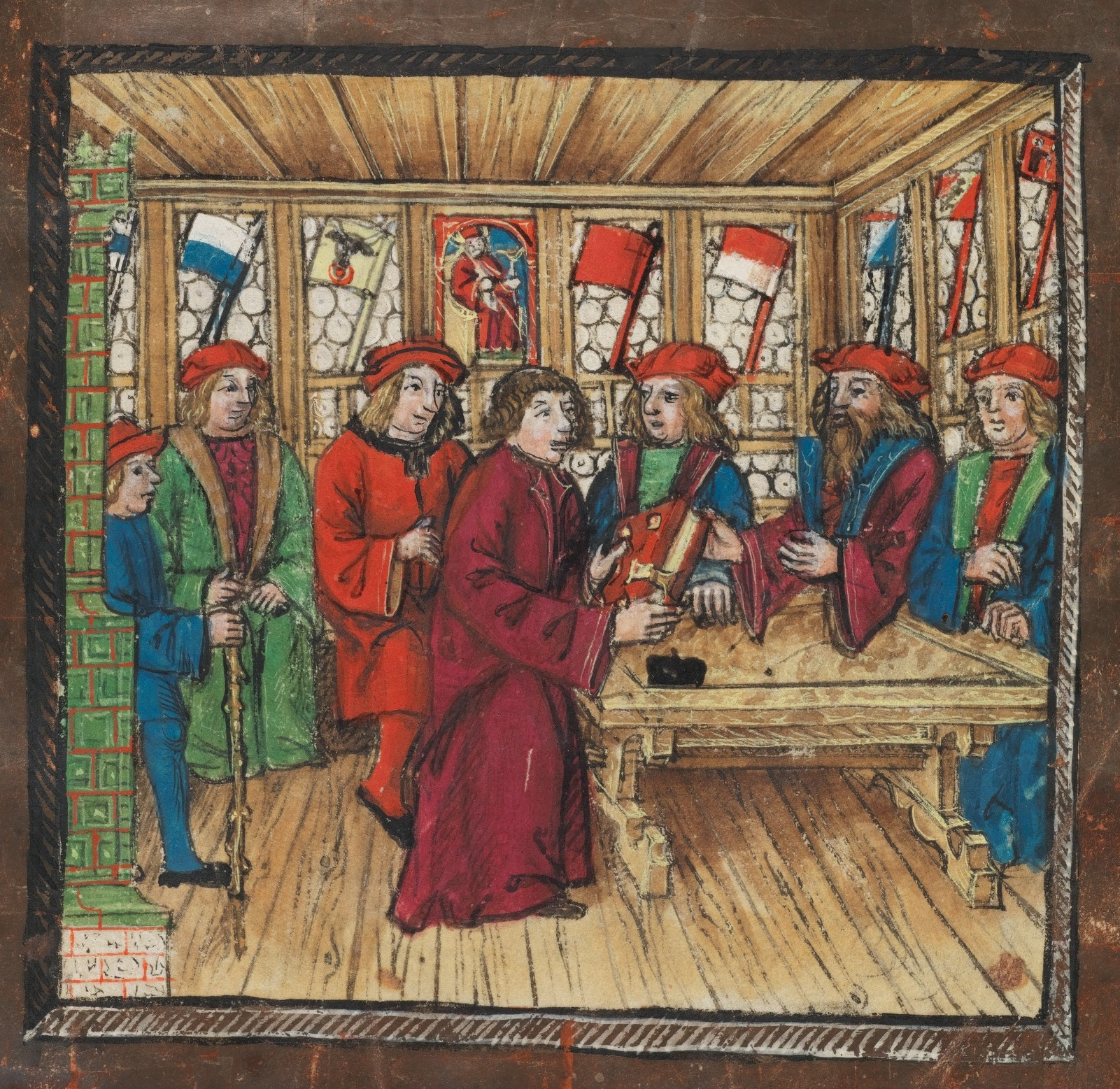
Self-portrait of Diebold Schilling the Younger in the presentation miniature of the Luzerner Chronik

Diebold Schilling the Younger (German: Diebold Schilling der Jüngere; before 1460 - possibly 3 November 1515) was a Swiss chronicler, priest, notary and soldier. He is best known as the author of the Luzerner Schilling (or Luzerner Chronik), one of the Swiss illustrated chronicles, which he presented to the city council of Lucerne on 15 January 1513. He was the nephew of the chronicler Diebold Schilling the Elder of Bern.

== Biography ==
Little is known about Schilling's early life. He was born before 1460, likely in Hagenau, Alsace, as the son of Johannes Schilling, a notary and public official. Schilling presumably began his education in Hagenau, as his father is still recorded as living there in 1467, and then likely continued his studies in Pavia. He then moved to Lucerne, Switzerland, and fought with the Swiss at the Battle of Nancy in 1477, at the end of the Burgundian Wars.

Schilling's scandalous lifestyle led him to be imprisoned and put on trial in Lucerne. He received the priesthood no later than 1481, and followed his father to the Diet of Stans that same year. He is also attested as a public notary. In 1497, Schilling began working as an interpreter to the Duke of Milan, Ludovico Sforza, later also becoming an agent in the duke's service. As a partisan of the Holy Roman Emperor, he was invited by the future Emperor Maximilian I to the Imperial Diet of Konstanz in 1507. From 1512 to 1515, Schilling was again employed by the Sforza family in Milan.

Schilling completed an illustrated chronicle of Lucerne, known as the Luzerner Schilling, in 1513. The chronicle covers Lucerne's history from its beginnings and, starting with the Battle of Sempach, the history of the Swiss Confederation. He also produced most of the chronicle's illustrations. Schilling died in Lucerne, presumably on 3 November 1515.
