= Berner Schilling =

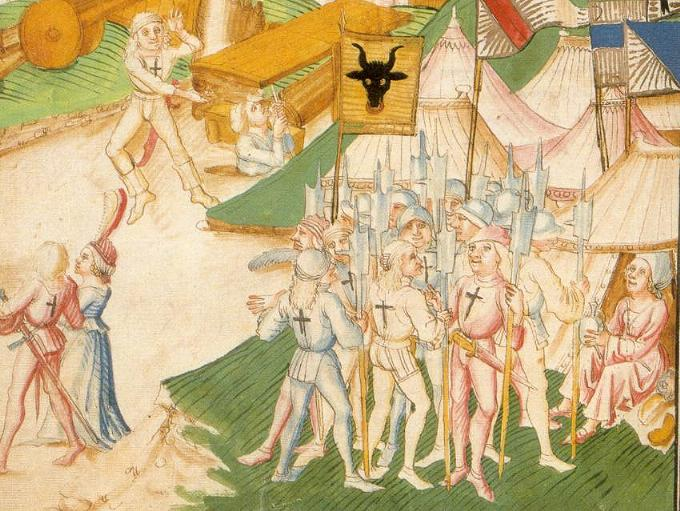
Swiss camp, troops of Uri with Marketenderinnen (vol. 3, p. 282)

The Berner Schilling (or Amtliche Chronik, also Grosse Burgunderchronik, Great Burgundy chronicle) is a chronicle of Diebold Schilling the Elder of Bern (1480s), covering the history of the Old Swiss Confederacy up to the Burgundian Wars.

== See also ==
- Swiss illustrated chronicles
