= Diebold Schilling the Elder =

Swiss chronicler (c. 1436–1439 – 1486)

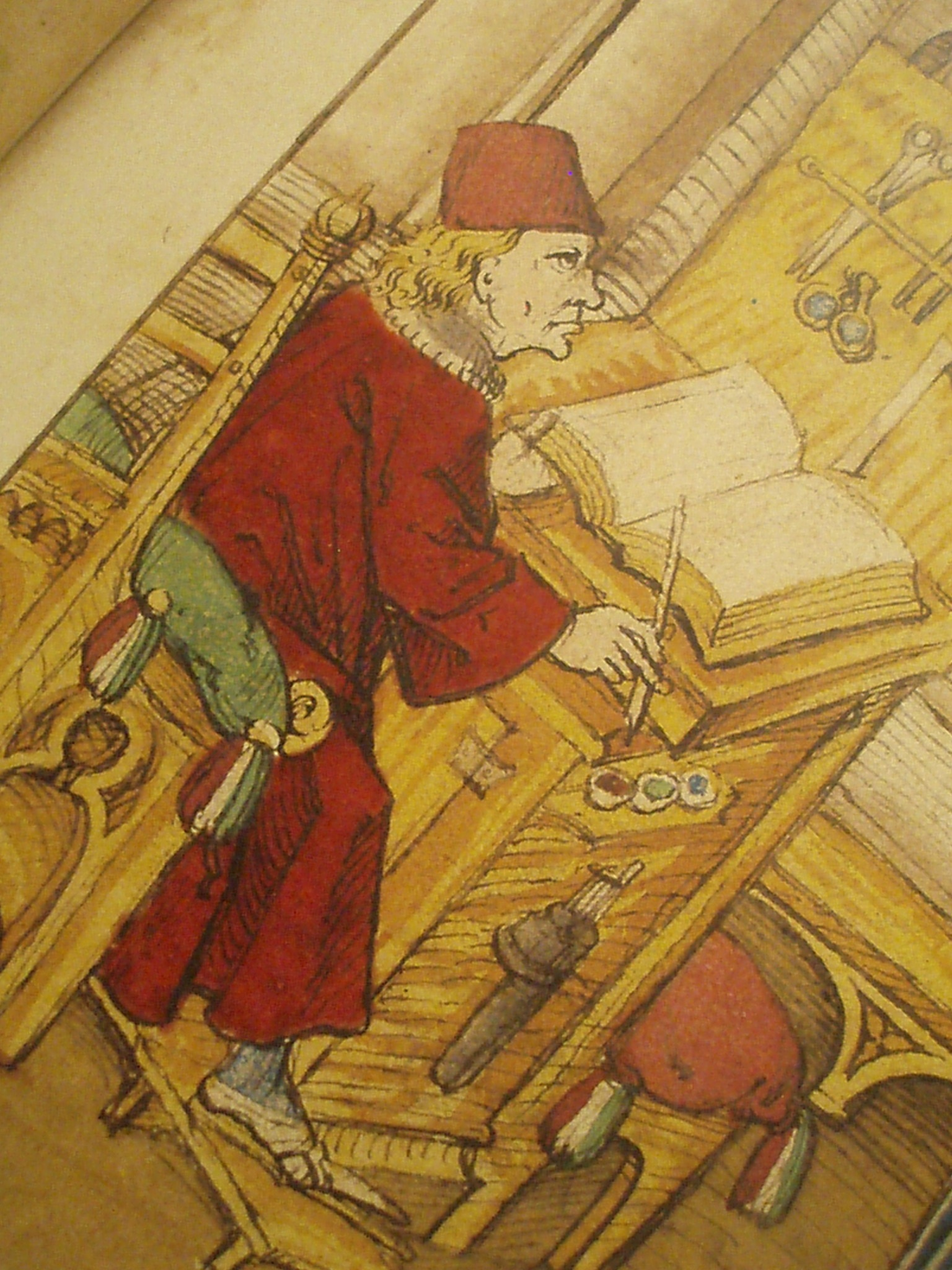
Portrait of Diebold Schilling at his studio, from the original manuscript of his Spiezer Chronik

Diebold Schilling the Elder (c. 1436–1439 – 1486) was the author of several of the Swiss illustrated chronicles, the Berner Schilling of 1483, the Zürcher Schilling of 1484, and the Spiezer Schilling (1480s).

== Biography ==
Schilling was born in Hagenau, Alsace, to Klaus Schilling, from Solothurn, and Else Weissen Henslin. In 1456, he began working at the chancellery of Lucerne. He settled in Bern in 1460 and became a member of its Grand Council in 1468.

In 1468, Schilling took part in the Waldshut War, and in 1476 he fought at the battles of Grandson and Morat during the Burgundian Wars, which likely prompted him to write his chronicles. In Bern, he served as secretary to the treasurer in 1476 and court clerk from 1481 to 1485. He died in Bern in 1486.

He was the uncle of the chronicler Diebold Schilling the Younger.

== Works ==
Three works by Schilling have survived: the Grosse Burgunderchronik (Great Burgundian Chronicle) or Zürcher Schilling, the three-volume Amtliche Chronik (Official Chronicle) or Berner Schilling, and his last work, the Spiezer Chronik or Spiezer Schilling, commissioned by former schultheiss of Bern Rudolf von Erlach. His first work, which deals with the Waldshut War, and his Kleine Burgunderchronik have not survived in their original text. His chronicles, richly illustrated, were to represent the past exactly but with a strong moral connotation.
