= Burgundian Wars =

1474–1477 Western European conflict

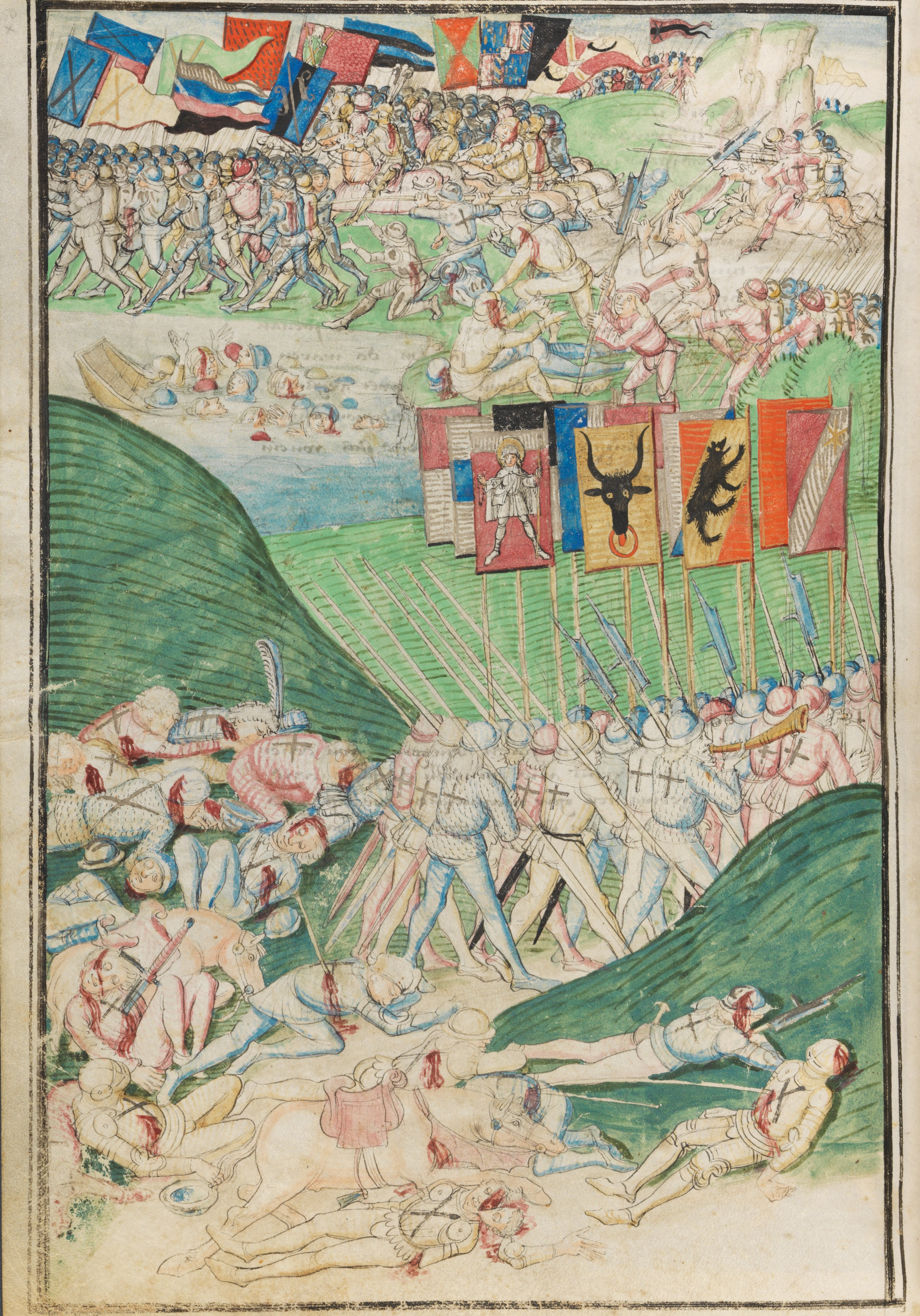
- The battle of Morat, from Diebold Schilling's Berne Chronicle
Date	1474–1477
Location	Lorraine and northwest Switzerland
Result	Lorrain-Swiss victory
Territorial changes	Extinction of Valois Burgundy and division between Valois France and Habsburg heirs

Belligerents
(Duchy of Burgundy) Burgundian State; Duchy of Savoy	Old Swiss Confederacy; Duchy of Lorraine; Lower League; Kingdom of France

Commanders and leaders
(Duchy of Burgundy) Charles the Bold, Duke of Burgundy †	(Duchy of Lorraine) René II, Duke of Lorraine (Old Swiss Confederacy) Hans Waldmann

The Burgundian Wars (1474–1477) were a conflict between the Burgundian State and the Old Swiss Confederacy and its allies. Open war broke out in 1474, and the Duke of Burgundy, Charles the Bold, was defeated three times on the battlefield in the following years and was killed at the Battle of Nancy in 1477. The Duchy of Burgundy and several other Burgundian lands then became part of France, and the Burgundian Netherlands and Franche-Comté were inherited by Charles's daughter, Mary of Burgundy, and eventually passed to the House of Habsburg upon her death because of her marriage to Maximilian I, Holy Roman Emperor.

== Background ==
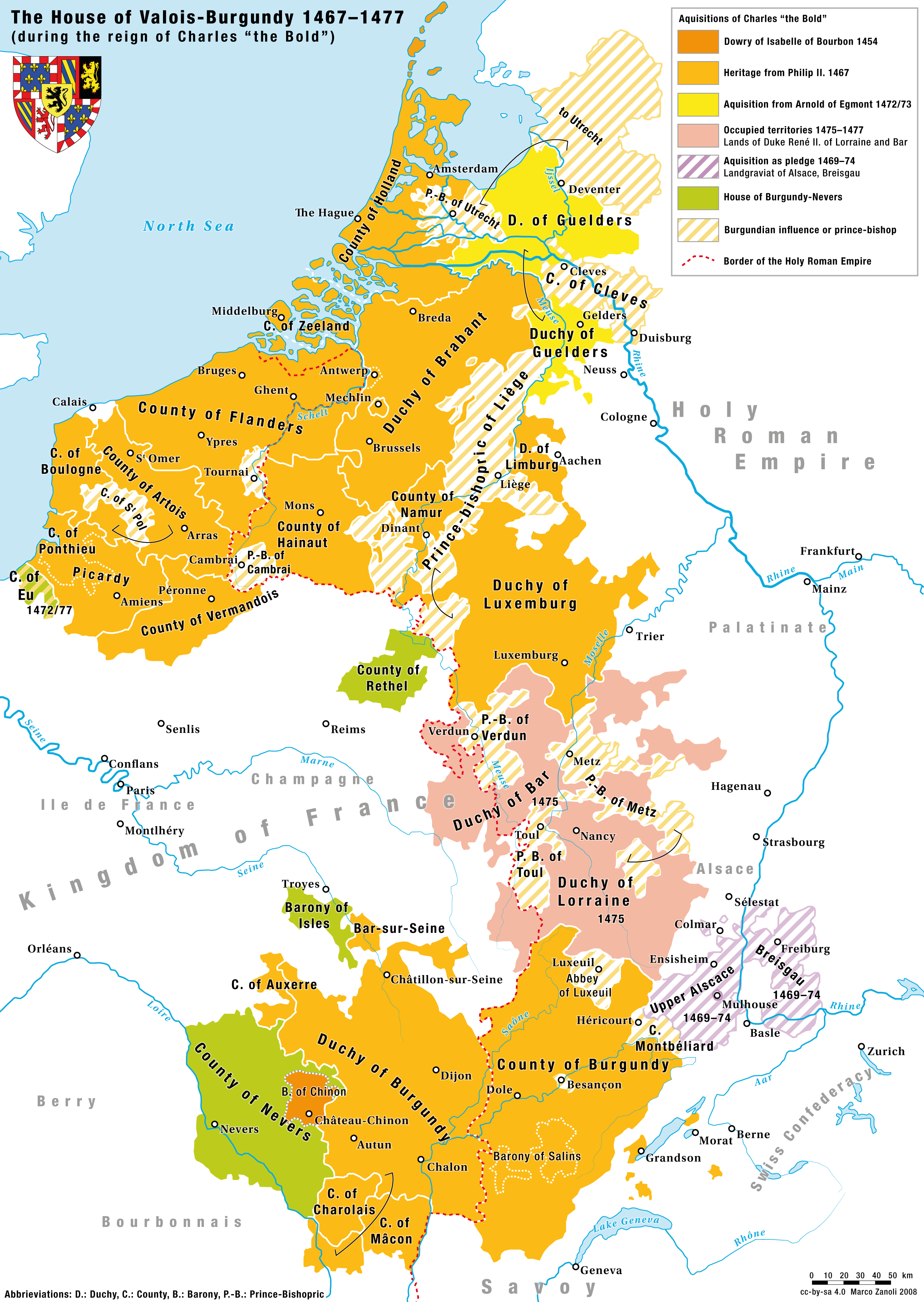
Territories of the house of Valois-Burgundy during the reign of Charles the Bold

The Valois dukes of Burgundy had succeeded, over a period of about 100 years, in establishing their rule as a strong force between the Holy Roman Empire and France. The consolidation of regional principalities with varying wealth into the Burgundian State brought great economic opportunity and wealth to the new power. A deciding factor for many elites in consolidating their lands was the relatively safe guarantee of making a profit under the economically stable Duchy of Burgundy. Their possessions included, besides their original territories of the Franche-Comté and the Duchy of Burgundy, the economically-strong regions of Flanders and Brabant as well as Luxembourg.

The dukes of Burgundy generally pursued aggressive expansionist politics, especially in Alsace and Lorraine, seeking to unite their northern and southern possessions geographically. Having already been in conflict with the French king, Burgundy had sided with the English in the Hundred Years' War but then the Yorkists in the Wars of the Roses, when Henry VI sided with France. The conflict had left the regional powers of France and England in a weakened state and allowed for the rise of the Burgundian power, alongside its fierce French rivals. The repercussions of the Black Death also continued to affect Europe and assisted in maintaining a diminished society. According to some historians, the extremely profitable region of the Low Countries supplied the Duchy of Burgundy with sufficient funds to support their ambitions internally but especially externally. In this period of expansion, treaties of trade and peace were signed with Swiss cantons, and would benefit the security of each power against Habsburg and French ambitions. Charles's advances along the Rhine brought him into conflict with the Habsburgs, especially Emperor Frederick III.

According to a Cambridge publication on Swiss history, both the Swiss and the Burgundians had made aggression a significant impact on the region's foreign affairs. In the effort of consolidating the Swiss Confederacy and for independence from Habsburg rule, Swiss forces gained control of the Habsburg town of Thurgau in an effort to expand its borders and influence. The Bernese people were more frequently being attacked by Charles the Bold's Lombard mercenaries. That raised concern to the Bernese as they began to call on their Swiss allies for assistance in the conflict with Burgundy. The aggressive actions of Charles the Bold would eventually culminate in the Swiss giving him the nickname, "the Turk in the West", and make Burgundy as fierce a rival as the Ottomans in the East.

== Conflict ==
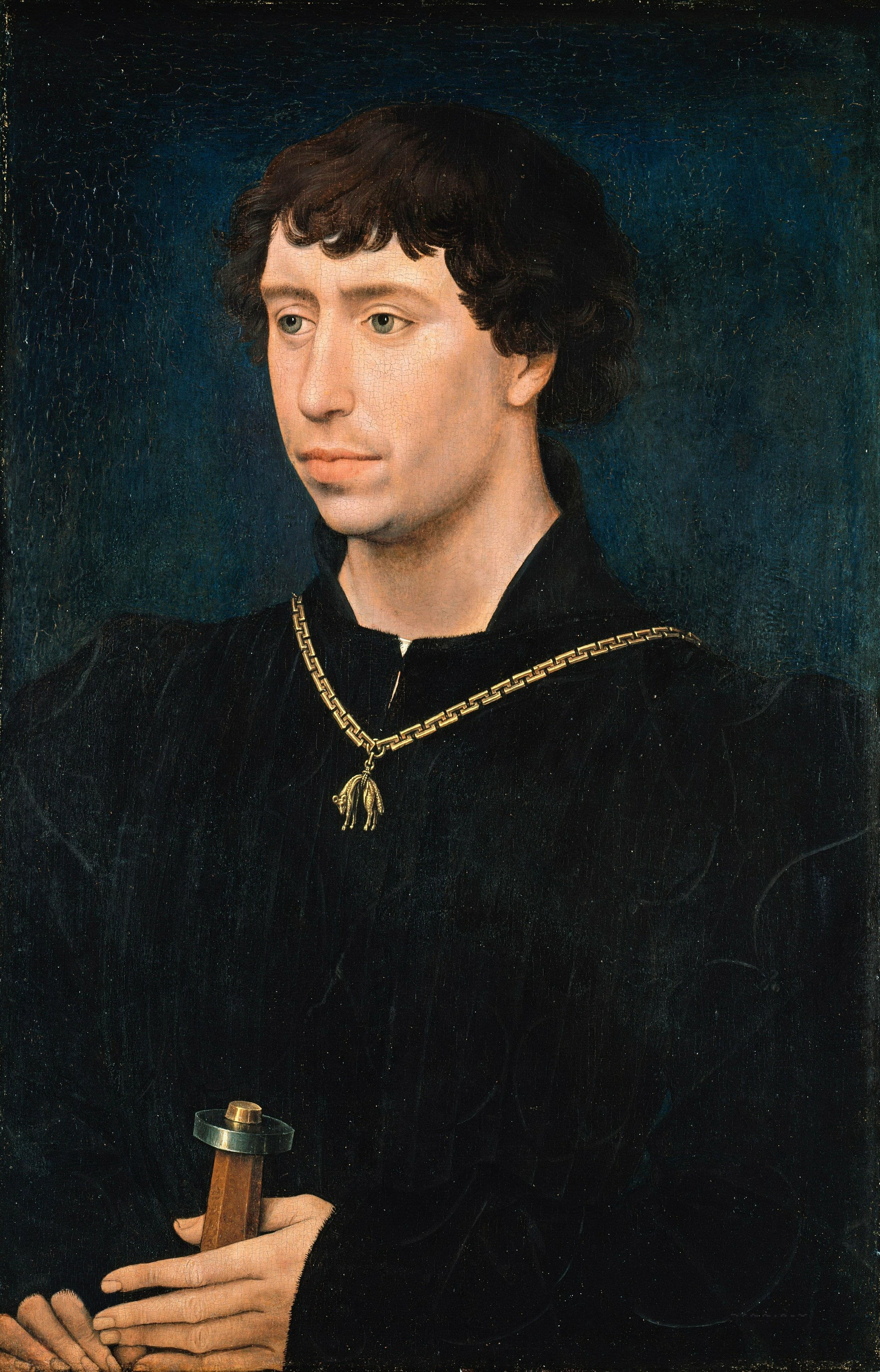
Charles the Bold, a contemporary portrait by Rogier van der Weyden

Initially in 1469, Duke Sigismund of Habsburg of Austria pawned his possessions in the Alsace in the Treaty of Saint-Omer as a fiefdom to the Duke of Burgundy for a loan or sum of 50,000 florins, as well as an alliance with Charles the Bold, to have them better protected from the expansion of the Eidgenossen (the Old Swiss Confederacy). Charles's involvement west of the Rhine gave him no reason to attack the confederates, as Sigismund had wanted, but his embargo politics against the cities of Basel, Strasbourg and Mulhouse, directed by his reeve Peter von Hagenbach, prompted them to turn to Bern for help. Charles's expansionist strategy suffered a first setback in his politics when his attack on the Archbishopric of Cologne failed after the unsuccessful Siege of Neuss (1474–75).

In the conflict's second phase, Sigismund sought to achieve a peace agreement with the Swiss confederates, which eventually was concluded in Konstanz in 1474 (later called the Ewige Richtung or Perpetual Accord). He wanted to buy back his Alsace possessions from Charles, who refused. Shortly afterwards, von Hagenbach was captured and executed by decapitation in Alsace, and the Swiss, united with the Alsace cities and Sigismund of Habsburg in an anti-Burgundian league, conquered part of the Burgundian Jura (Franche-Comté) by winning the Battle of Héricourt in November 1474. King Louis XI of France joined the coalition by the Treaty of Andernach in December. The next year, Bernese forces conquered and ravaged Vaud, which belonged to the Duchy of Savoy, which was allied with Charles the Bold. Bern had called out to its Swiss allies for expansion into the Vaud region of Savoy to prevent future aggression by Charles near Bernese lands that were geographically closer to Burgundy than those of the rest of the Swiss Confederation. However, the other Swiss cities had become displeased at the ever-growing expansionist and aggressive Bernese foreign policy and so initially did not support Bern. The Confederacy was a collective defense agreement between the Swiss members and ensured that if one city were attacked, the others would come to its aid. Because the military actions by Bern in Savoy were an invasion, the other Confederacy allies had no legal obligation to come to the aid of the Bernese.

In the Valais, the independent republics of the Sieben Zenden, with the help of Bernese and other confederate forces, drove the Savoyards out of the lower Valais after a victory in the Battle on the Planta in November 1475. In 1476, Charles retaliated and marched to Grandson, which belonged to Pierre de Romont of Savoy but had recently been taken by the Swiss. There, he had the capitulated garrison hanged or drowned in the lake. When the confederate forces arrived a few days later, Charles was defeated in the Battle of Grandson and was forced to flee the battlefield, leaving behind his artillery and many provisions and valuables. Having rallied his army, he was dealt a devastating blow by the confederates at the Battle of Morat. As Burgundian losses continued, Charles the Bold lost the support of his lords, who were losing men and profit, and a rebellion soon began, led by René II, Duke of Lorraine. As the revolt continued, René used his land's strategic location between northern and southern Burgundy to cut off communication and to disrupt war capabilities. The internal conflict only made the war with the Swiss more difficult and pulled Charles's attention away from the Confederacy to deal with the more pressing matter of René's revolt. Charles the Bold raised a new army but fell during the Battle of Nancy in 1477 in which the Swiss fought alongside an army of René. The military failures of Charles the Bold are summarized by a common contemporary Swiss quote: "Charles the Bold lost his goods at Grandson, his bravery at Morat and his blood at Nancy."

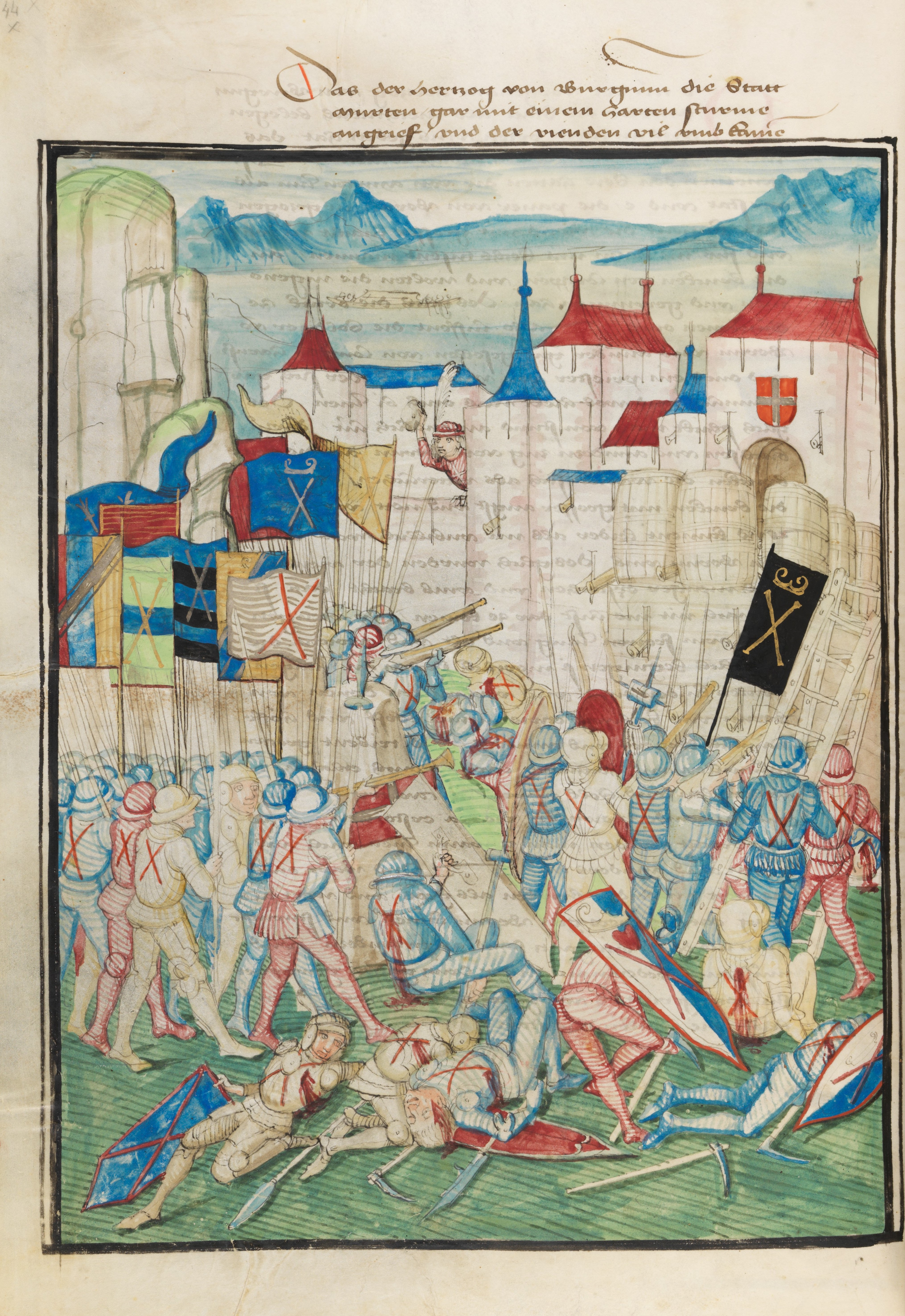
Assault of the Burgundian army on the walls of Morat (22 June 1476)

Near the end of 1476, the Swiss Confederacy began receiving orders from Pope Sixtus IV, who called for an end of the war and the signing of peace between the Swiss and Charles. Although that seemed to be a peaceful resolution to the war, the Pope's aspirations for Charles to divert his attention away from the Swiss and onto the Muslims in a crusade began to show. The papal pressure was eventually ignored by the Swiss, who refused to end the war unless Charles left the Duchy of Lorraine, whose lands were controlled by René II. It is evident through contemporary writings that espionage and censorship played an influential role in both Swiss and Burgundian actions throughout the war. Professional spies were hired by both sides to recover information of enemy movements and weak points. However, this profession proved to be extremely lethal, as some Swiss cities suffered heavy losses, and obtaining information of the opposing side continued to be a difficult task throughout the war.

The Burgundian Wars also assisted in the shift of military strategy across Europe after the Swiss victories over the numerically-superior Burgundians. The Gewalthaufen proved to be an effective Swiss military strategy against the superior Burgundian forces. Until that point, battles had been dominated by cavalry, which could easily overpower infantry troops on the battlefield. However, the Gewalthaufen tactic used long spears to counter cavalry with remarkable success. That marked a key shift in military history and tipped the balance in favour of infantry troops over mounted soldiers.

== Aftermath ==
Burgundian territories (orange/yellow) and limits of France (red) after the Burgundian Wars.

The results of the conflict would prove to have significant repercussions for the future of the Duchy of Burgundy and for the regional stability of Western Europe. With the death of Charles the Bold, the Valois dynasty of the dukes of Burgundy died out, and widespread revolts engulfed the Duchy, which soon collapsed under those pressures. The northern territories of the dukes of Burgundy became a possession of the Habsburgs when Archduke Maximilian of Austria, who would later become Holy Roman Emperor, married Charles's only daughter, Mary of Burgundy. The duchy proper reverted to the crown of France under King Louis XI.

On 24 January 1478, the Peace of Zürich was signed between Maximilian of Habsburg (as heir of Charles the Bold), Duke René of Lorraine, Archduke Sigmund of Austria, the Swiss Confederacy, and the rest of the Lower Union. The contracting parties pledged mutual neutrality, and the Swiss Confederation returned the Free County of Burgundy (Franche-Comté) to Maximilian for 150,000 guilders. In the meantime, in early 1477, the Franche-Comté had become occupied by French soldiers instead. Later, it was ceded to Maximilian's son Philip in 1493 by Charles VIII at the Treaty of Senlis in an attempt to bribe the emperor to remain neutral during Charles's planned invasion of Italy.

The victories of the Eidgenossen (Swiss Confederation) over what was one of the most powerful military forces in Europe gained it a reputation of being nearly invincible, and the Burgundian Wars marked the beginning of the rise of Swiss mercenaries on the battlefields of Europe. Although Bern and other Swiss cities invaded and controlled large swathes of Savoyard territories, the Confederacy maintained only Grandson, Morat and Echallens as notable cities. Inside the Confederacy itself, however, the outcome of the war led to internal conflict since the city cantons insisted on having most of the proceeds as they had supplied the most troops. The country cantons resented that, and the Dreizehn Orte disputes almost led to war. They were settled by the Stanser Verkommnis of 1481.

== See also ==
- Battles of the Burgundian Wars
- Cologne Diocesan Feud
