= Ghislain de Diesbach =

French writer (1931–2023)

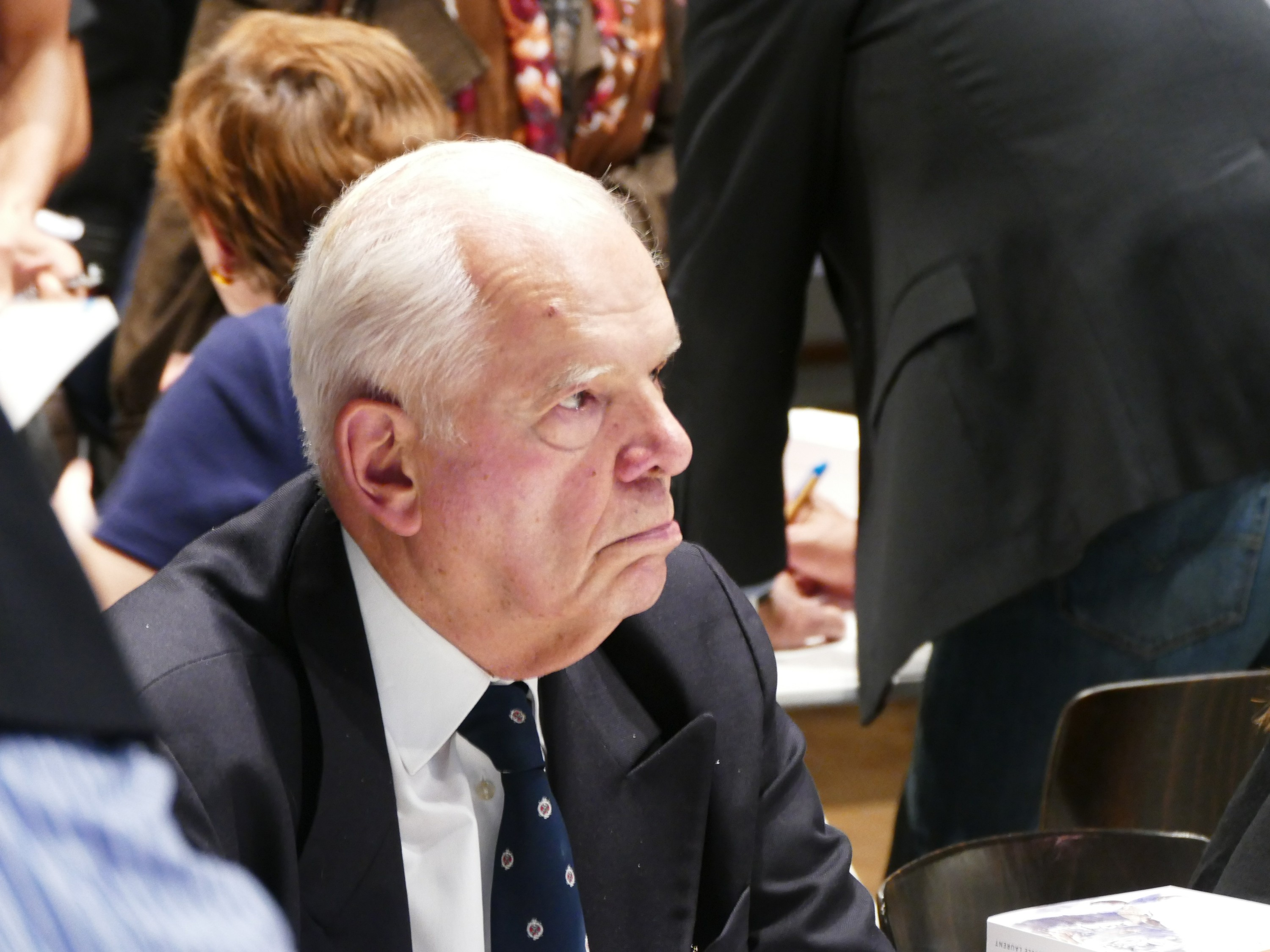
De Diesbach in 2015

Ghislain de Diesbach de Belleroche (6 August 1931 – 14 December 2023) was a French writer and biographer. He died on 14 December 2023, at the age of 92.

== Works ==
- 1960: Iphigénie en Thuringe : nouvelles, Julliard, Paris
- 1962: Un joli train de vie, Julliard
- 1964: Favre de Thierrens, essai biographique, Émile-Paul, Paris; Preface by André Bonnefous, 1 vol. in-12, 219 pp. and 26 illustrations hors-texte.
- 1964: Les Secrets du Gotha, Julliard; reprint at Éditions Perrin, Paris 2012
- 1966: George III, Berger-Levrault; Paris
- 1969: Le Grand Mourzouk, Julliard; reprint at Via Romana, Versailles, 2015
- 1969: Le tour de Jules Verne en quatre-vingts livres, Julliard; reprint under the title Le tour de Jules Verne en 80 livres, Perrin, 2002, ISBN 2-262-01677-1
- 1972: Le Gentilhomme de notre temps : manuel des bonnes manières, nouveau traité de savoir-vivre, Hachette Littérature, Paris
- 1972: Service de France, Émile-Paul
- 1975: Histoire de l'émigration : 1789-1814, Bernard Grasset, Paris, ISBN 2-246-00179-X
- 1978: Necker ou la Faillite de la vertu, Perrin, ISBN 2-262-00118-9
- 1979: with Robert Grouvel, Échec à Bonaparte : Louis-Edmond de Phélippeaux, 1767-1799, Perrin
- 1979: Ferdinand Bac : 1859-1952
- 1981: Aix-Marseille 1949-1955 (souvenirs) Paris
- 1983: Madame de Staël, Perrin, ISBN 2-262-00284-3
- 1986: La Princesse Bibesco : 1886-1973, Perrin, series "Terres des femmes", ISBN 2-262-00394-7
- 1988: La Double vie de la duchesse Colonna : 1836-1879 : la Chimère Bleue, Perrin, series "Terres des femmes", ISBN 2-262-00516-8. Reprint by éditions de Penthes, Prégny-Genève, 2015
- 1991: Proust, Perrin, ISBN 2-262-00768-3
- 1993: Philippe Jullian : un esthète aux enfers, Plon, ISBN 2-259-02610-9
- 1995: Chateaubriand, Perrin, ISBN 2-262-00101-4
- 1996: Au bon patriote : nouvelles, Plon, ISBN 2-259-18470-7
- 1998: Ferdinand de Lesseps, Perrin, ISBN 2-262-01234-2
- 1999: Sophie Rostopchine, comtesse de Ségur, Perrin, ISBN 2-262-01518-X
- 2001: Un lieu tout plein de gaîté, Poly print, Paris, ISBN 2-908334-16-X
- 2001: Louis de Diesbach 1893-1982, essai biographique, Paris, Hugues de Diesbach et Poly Print Editions
- 2002: Un prince 1900 : Ferdinand Bac, Perrin, ISBN 2-262-01517-1
- 2003: L'abbé Mugnier : le confesseur du Tout-Paris, Perrin, ISBN 2-262-01970-3
- 2005: Une éducation manquée : souvenirs, 1931-1949, Perrin, ISBN 2-262-01027-7
- 2007: Petit Dictionnaire des idées mal reçues, Via Romana, Versailles 180 p. ISBN 978-2-916727-16-5
- 2009: Une éducation manquée : souvenirs 1931-1948, Via Romana, (édition augmentée) ISBN 978-2-916727-46-2
- 2009: Gare Saint-Charles : souvenirs 1949-1957, Via Romana, ISBN 978-2-916727-45-5
- 2009: Richard Burton, P.U.F., Paris, (ISBN 978-2-35764-010-8)
- 2010: Le goût d'autrui : portraits anecdotiques, Via Romana, ISBN 978-2-916727-86-8
- 2013: Un début à Paris : souvenirs 1957-1966, Via Romana, ISBN 979-10-90029-48-4
- 2014: Nouveau savoir-vivre : éloge de la bonne éducation, Perrin, ISBN 2-262-04100-8
- 2018: La Vie des autres : souvenirs d'un biographe, Fribourg, BCU, 309 p.
- 2020: Vieille Angleterre de ma jeunesse, Paris, Lacurne, 140 pp.

== Honours ==
- 1962: Prix Cazes brasserie Lipp for Un joli train de vie, Julliard
- 1992: Grand Prix de la biographie of the Académie française for Proust, Perrin, 1991, ISBN 2-262-00768-3
- 1995: Prix du Pen Club français
- 1999: Prix des Ambassadeurs for Ferdinand de Lesseps, Perrin, 1998, ISBN 2-262-01234-2
- 1999: Prix Charles Garnier for Ferdinand de Lesseps, Perrin, 1998, ISBN 2-262-01234-2
- 2000: Prix Renaissance for le Petit dictionnaire des idées mal reçues, Via Romana, Versailles, 2007 ISBN 978-2-916727-16-5

== Family ==
The Diesbach family is of Swiss origin, from the canton of Berne. At the time of the Reformation, part of the family remained Catholic and, having to leave Bern, took refuge in Fribourg. The Diesbachs have supplied a large number of officers to the foreign service, notably in Austria, France, Poland, Sardinia, and Naples. In France the Swiss regiment of Diesbach, created in 1690, became the 85th regiment of line infantry.

== See also ==
- Ludwig von Diesbach (1452-1527).
- Nicolas de Diesbach
- Rodolphe de Diesbach
- Frédéric de Diesbach Torny
- Louis de Diesbach de Belleroche
- Roger de Diesbach
