= Beat Ludwig von Mülinen =

Bernese politician and Schultheiss

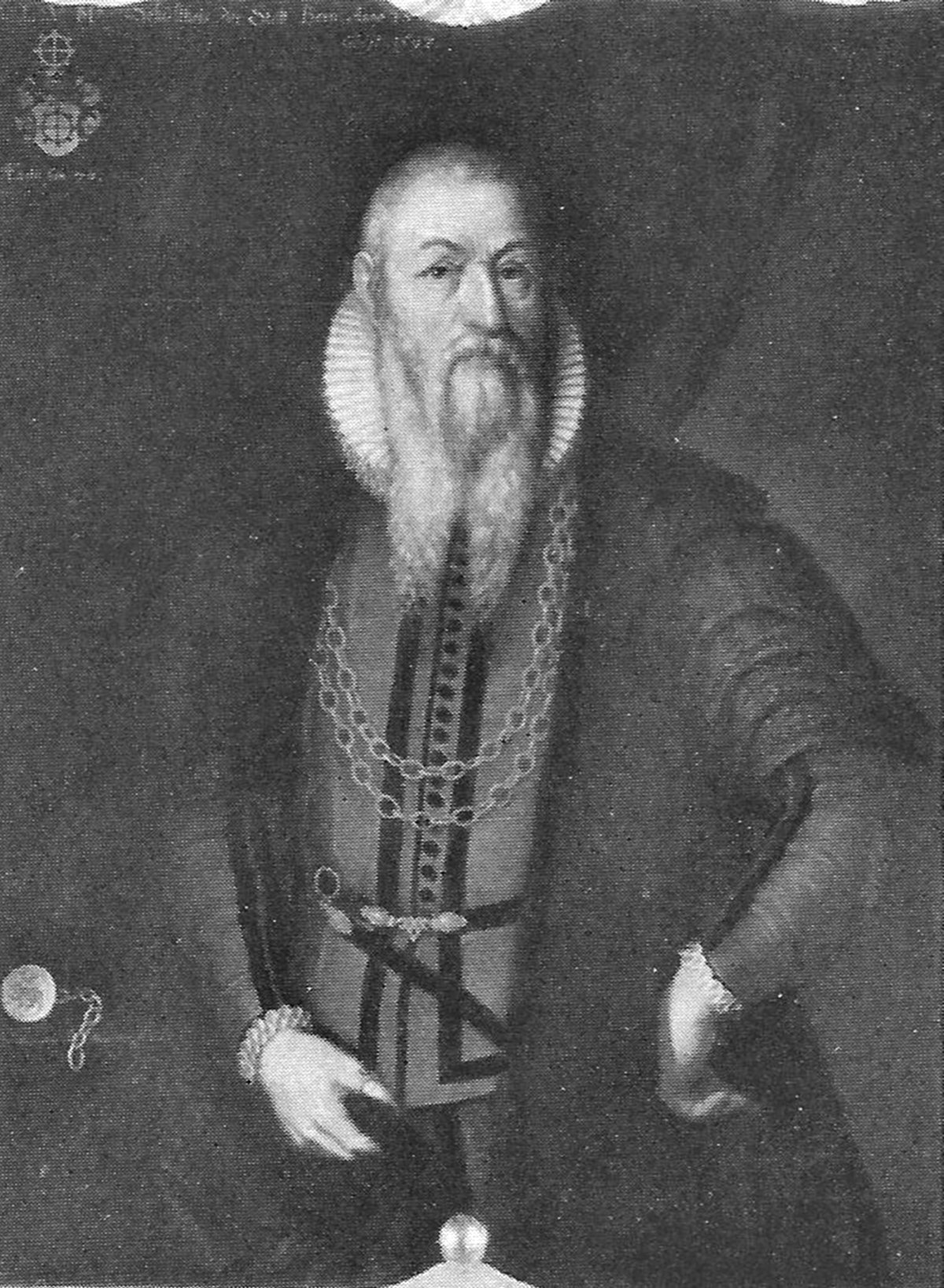

Schultheiss of Bern
- In office 1568–1597

Bailli of Gex
- In office 1552–1560

Avoyer of Berthoud
- In office 1543–1550

Personal details
- Born: 1 September 1521
- Died: 7 August 1597 (aged 75) Bern, Old Swiss Confederacy
- Spouse(s): Margaretha Nägeli (m. 1542) Anna von Wyngarten (m. 1578)
- Parent: Kaspar von Mülinen
- Relatives: Ludwig von Diesbach (grandfather)

Beat Ludwig von Mülinen (1 September 1521 – 7 August 1597) was a Protestant Bernese patrician and politician who served as Schultheiss (chief magistrate) of Bern from 1568 to 1597.

== Life and career ==
Born on 1 September 1521, von Mülinen was the son of Kaspar von Mülinen and the grandson of Ludwig von Diesbach. He married twice: first to Margaretha Nägeli, daughter of Hans Franz Nägeli, in 1542, and later to Anna von Wyngarten in 1578.

Von Mülinen became a member of the Grand Council of Bern in 1542 and was appointed avoyer of Burgdorf from 1543 to 1550. He was elected to the Small Council of Bern in 1552 and served as bailli of Gex from 1552 to 1560. From 1568 to 1597, he held the position of Schultheiss of Bern, serving in two-year rotations until 1585 and then in one-year terms thereafter.

As a representative of Bern, von Mülinen was frequently delegated to the federal Diet and served as ambassador to France and Savoy. In 1579, he negotiated the treaty between France, Bern, and Solothurn for the protection of Geneva. In 1589, he confirmed Bern's renunciation of its claims to Gex and Chablais in favor of Savoy. Von Mülinen acquired the manor of Wittigkofen in 1570.

He died on 7 August 1597 in Bern.

== Bibliography ==
- von Rodt, Genealogien, vol. 4, p. 114
- Feller, Bern, vol. 2, pp. 424–461
