= Wiedlisbach Castle =

Castle in Wiedlisbach, Bern, Switzerland

- Burg Wiedlisbach or Städtliturm
- Wiedlisbach in Switzerland
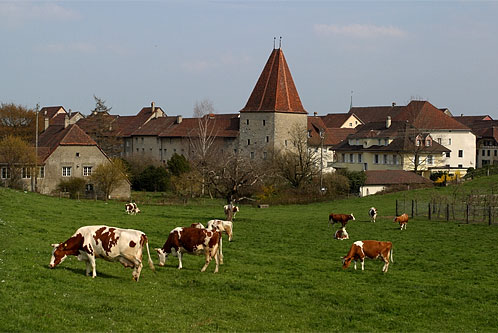
- Wiedlisbach Tower

Site information
- Type: Tower house
- Owner: private
- Open to the public: no
- Condition: preserved

Location
- Coordinates: 47°15′7.38″N 7°38′45.72″E

Site history
- Built: mid 13th century
- Built by: Count Ludwig the Elder von Frohburg
- Battles/wars: Swiss peasant war of 1653

Wiedlisbach Castle (German: Burg Wiedlisbach or German: Städtliturm) is a former tower house and defensive tower in the municipality of Wiedlisbach of the Canton of Bern in Switzerland.

== History ==
In the mid-13th century, Count Ludwig the Elder von Frohburg built the fortified village of Wiedlisbach to collect tolls and host markets along the road to Zofingen. The village was built as a rectangle with a large central market plaza astride the east-west running road. A combination tower house and defensive tower, known as the Städtliturm, was built in the north-west corner and likely served as the residence of the count's local representative. The village wall, up to 9 m (30 ft) tall and 1.7 m (5.6 ft) thick, had two gates: the Biel gate to the west and the Basel gate to the east. The village was first mentioned in 1275 as Oppidum or Municipium Wietilspach.

During the 13th and 14th centuries, a local noble family, the von Wiedlisbach family, appeared in the village, probably in service to whichever noble family owned it. When the Frohberg family died out, Wiedlisbach passed to the Counts of Neuchâtel-Nidau in the late 13th century. Count Rudolph of Neuchâtel-Nidau appears in the record as ruler of nearby Bipp Castle in 1297, and in 1313 he was documented as ruling over Wiedlisbach. In 1375, it passed into the estates of the Homberg/Thierstein family and was attacked by a band of Gugler knights. A few years later, it was acquired by the Kyburgs. However, after a disastrous Kyburg raid in 1383 led to the Burgdorferkrieg and poverty for the family, Wiedlisbach was sold to Bern and Solothurn in 1406. In 1463, it was acquired wholly by Bern and has remained part of the Canton of Bern since then.

During the Swiss peasant war of 1653, Wiedlisbach joined the uprising. The uprising was quickly suppressed, and on 5 June 1653 the town fell to the attacking government troops. However, the town walls, gate houses, and tower were not destroyed. The victorious Bernese troops plundered the town and took away the wooden gates. The gate towers remained intact but open until 1827, when they were finally demolished to make way for new roads. While the city walls were slowly absorbed into local buildings, their impact on the compact shape of the village core is still visible. The large central plaza was gradually filled in with new construction over the centuries since the village's foundation. The Städtliturm is still clearly visible at the northwest corner of the village core and is a symbol of Wiedlisbach.

== See also ==
- List of castles in Switzerland
