= Niklaus von Diesbach (politician) =

Bernese politician and diplomat

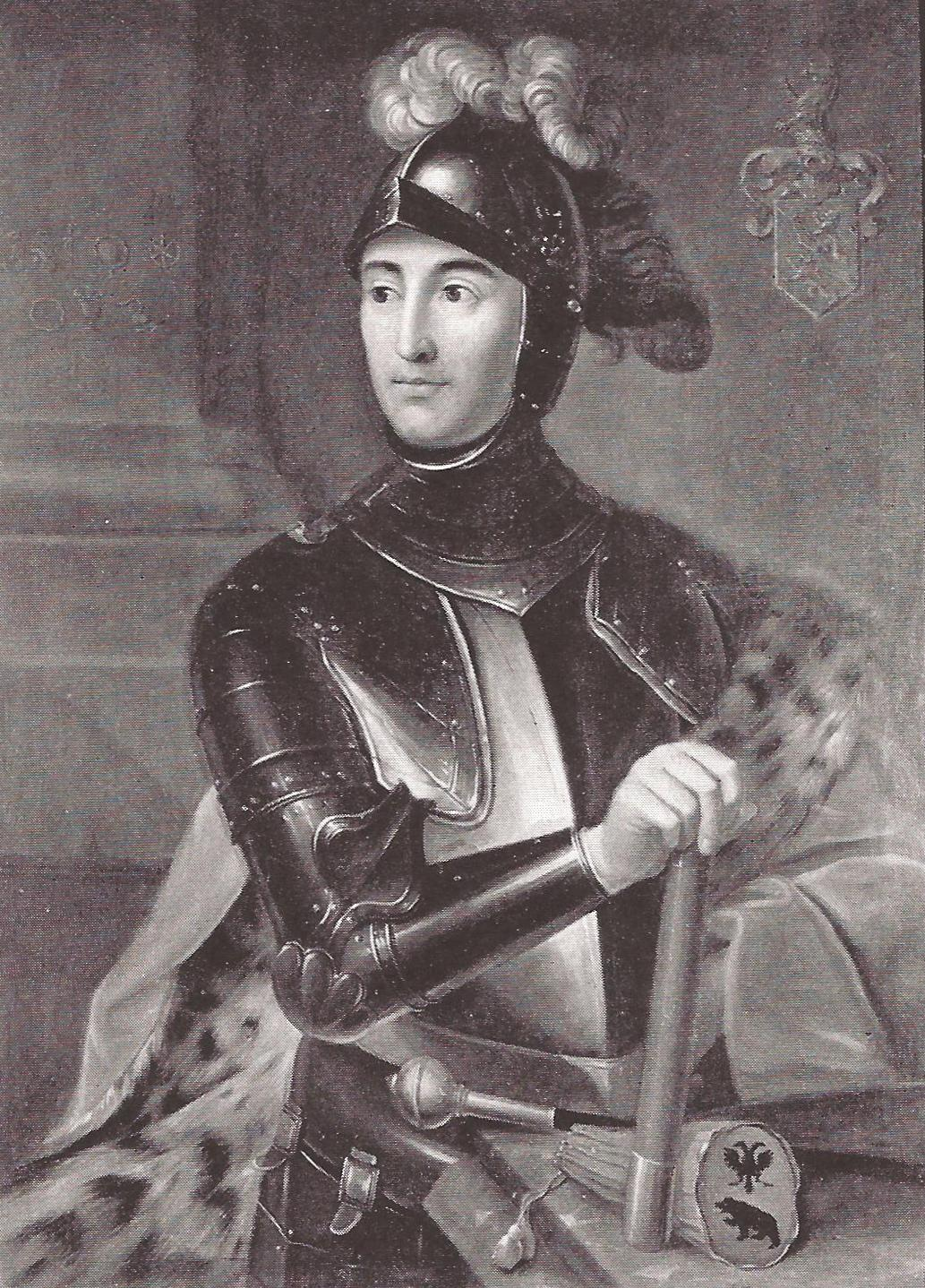

Schultheiss of Bern
- In office 1465–1466
- In office 1474–1475

Personal details
- Born: 1430
- Died: 7 August 1475 Porrentruy
- Spouse(s): Anna von Rüssegg (m. 1449) Barbara von Scharnachtal (m. 1467)
- Parent(s): Loy von Diesbach; Klara von Büren

Niklaus von Diesbach (1430 – 7 August 1475) was a Bernese politician, diplomat, and merchant who served as Schultheiss (chief magistrate) of Bern in 1465–1466 and 1474–1475. He played a crucial role in forging the anti-Burgundian alliance that led to the Burgundian Wars and in negotiating the Perpetual Peace with Austria in 1474.

== Early life and commercial career ==
Niklaus von Diesbach was born in 1430, the son of Loy von Diesbach, a member of the Small Council of Bern and lord of Signau through his marriage to Klara von Büren. In 1449, Niklaus married Anna von Rüssegg, daughter of Henmann II von Rüssegg, a squire, lord of Büren, and citizen of Lucerne. After her death, he married Barbara von Scharnachtal, daughter of Kaspar von Scharnachtal, in 1467.

From 1439, Diesbach trained as a merchant in Basel under Wernlin von Kilchen, head of the Halbisen company. He made several journeys to Spain, particularly to Barcelona, between 1444 and 1449, and became involved in the affairs of the Diesbach-Watt Company. After beginning his political career, his role in the company was limited to financial participation. His membership in the noble guild of Distelzwang, his generosity, and his oratorical talent accelerated his political rise: he became a member of the Great Council in 1450, and of the Small Council in 1452 upon his father's death. He was elected Schultheiss of Bern in 1465–1466 and again in 1474–1475.

Ambitious and recently ennobled, Diesbach sought to outmaneuver Adrian von Bubenberg, descendant of an old patrician family, by undertaking a pilgrimage to Jerusalem and to the Monastery of Saint Catherine in the Sinai. Together with his cousin Wilhelm von Diesbach, he was made a knight of the Order of Saint Catherine of Mount Sinai. In 1469, he acquired the last portions of the lordships of Diessbach and Worb, inherited from the Kilchen and Bokess families, when the Twingherrenstreit conflict erupted in the jurisdiction of Konolfingen. Together with his future adversary Adrian von Bubenberg, he fought to maintain seigneurial rights and opposed the burghers who supported Schultheiss Peter Kistler (around 1480).

== Foreign policy and diplomacy ==
Through his activity in the Diesbach-Watt company, Diesbach became aware of the importance for Bern of the commercial route to Spain and Italy via the Swiss Plateau. Thanks to old treaties of friendship with its western neighbors, Bern secured control of this axis. From 1471, Burgundy threatened this system of mutual protection, which Diesbach recognized quickly. Count Jacques de Romont, baron and administrator of Savoyard domains in the Pays de Vaud, had allied himself with Charles the Bold, Duke of Burgundy. In 1473, he became commander-in-chief of one-third of the Burgundian troops. His sister-in-law, Duchess Yolande of Valois, also played the Burgundian card, as did the Count of Neuchâtel and the lord of Valangin.

For this reason, Diesbach, who had been received at the court of Louis XI since 1463, sought to transform the neutrality treaty he had obtained from the king in 1470 into an offensive alliance between France and the Confederates. Disappointed that Charles the Bold had occupied the Sundgau lands that had been pledged to him without having to attack the Confederation, Duke Sigismund of Austria declared war on him. During negotiations at the French court, Diesbach prepared the Perpetual Peace (1474) with Austria. Louis XI played the role of arbitrator following the aggressive reactions provoked by the 1472 project. Thus, the peace with Austria could take its final form, favorable to the Confederation.

Diesbach continued his anti-Burgundian policy by negotiating a treaty between France and the Confederation, which brought the Confederation an annual pension of 20,000 florins and earned Diesbach the title of chamberlain to the King of France. He used all his diplomatic skill to achieve the conclusion of an alliance between the eight cantons and Solothurn on one side, and Duke Sigismund and the powers of the Lower Union on the other. After the victory of this coalition at Héricourt, Diesbach demanded at the turn of 1474–1475, again against the will of Adrian von Bubenberg, joint action by the offensive alliance between France and the Confederates.

== Death and legacy ==
Diesbach died on 7 August 1475 in Porrentruy. The true value of his actions only became apparent after his death: he had indicated for Bern and the Confederation the path of a policy of westward conquest, which was successfully resumed in 1536.

== Bibliography ==
- Bittmann, K. Ludwig XI. und Karl der Kühne, 1970
- Gasser, A. "Ewige Richtung und Burgunderkriege", in RSH, 23, 1973, 697-749
