= Von Scharnachtal =

Swiss noble family from Bern

von Scharnachtal
- Noble family
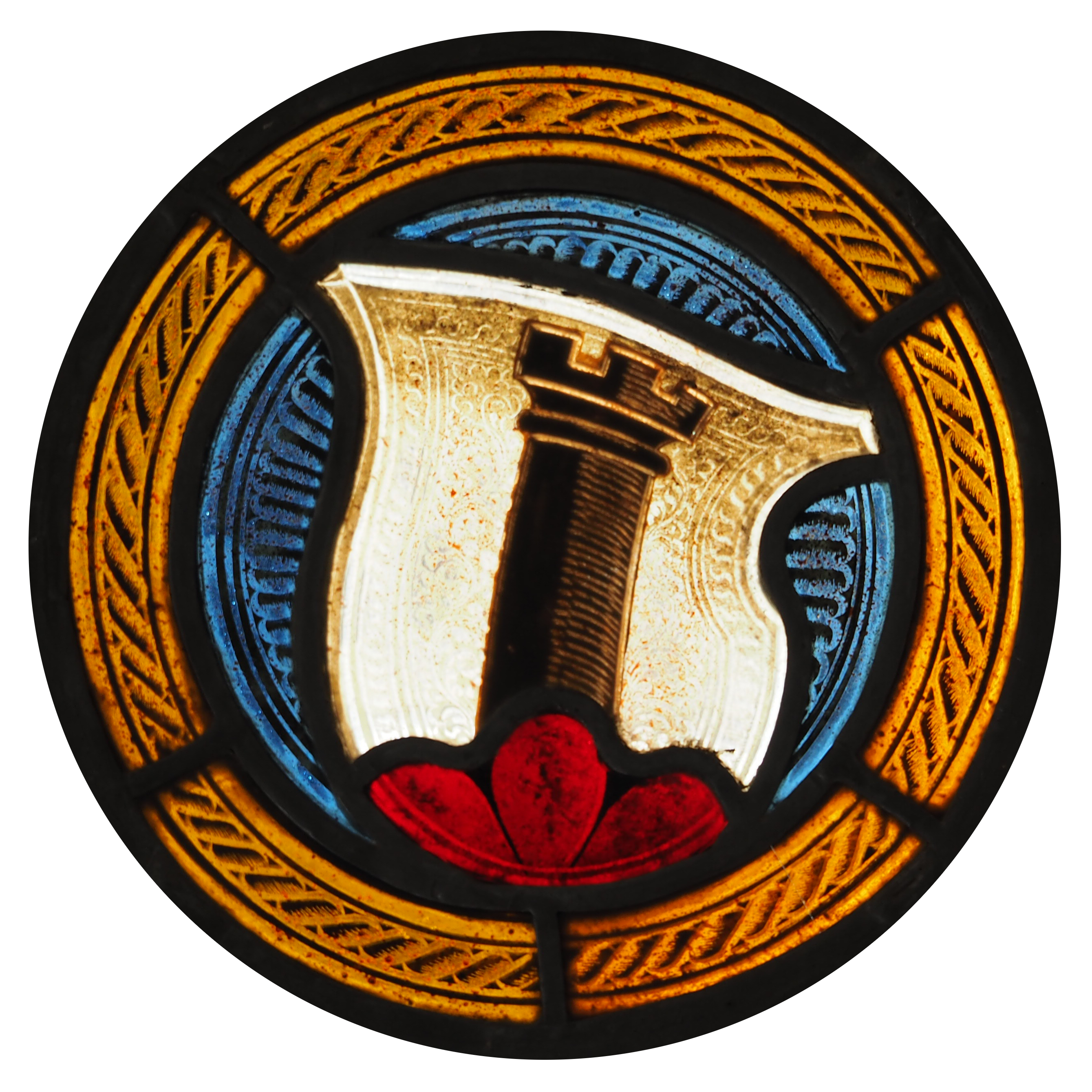
- Country: Switzerland
- Current region: Bern
- Etymology: Village of Scharnachtal, Kiental
- Origin: Bernese Oberland
- Founded: 13th century
- Dissolution: 1590

The von Scharnachtal family was a Swiss noble family originally serving as ministeriales of the barons of Wädenswil. The family name derives from the village of Scharnachtal, located at the entrance to the Kiental in the Bernese Oberland. Several members of the family are documented in the 13th century, but it is only from the following century onward that their genealogy can be partially established.

== History ==
=== Early history and establishment in Bern ===
The family held possessions in the Bernese Oberland. Around 1300/1301, Burkart obtained citizenship rights in Bern, where his descendants settled during the 14th century. Niklaus (died 1413/1414) married Antonia von Seftigen in 1395, which gave him access to the inheritance of one of the wealthiest Bernese families of the 14th century. Notably, in 1398 he purchased half of the lordship of Oberhofen am Thunersee.

=== Two branches ===
Niklaus's sons Heinzmann (died 1470), the elder, and Franz (died 1439) founded two branches of the family.

==== Senior branch ====
Conrad von Scharnachtal, the eldest son of Heinzmann, is known for his travels, while his brother Wilhelm (died 1466) served as bailiff of Bipp (1455–1457), Bechburg (1458–1460), and Aarberg (1463). This branch became extinct with Hans Wilhelm, Wilhelm's son, whose last office was that of Schultheiss of Büren in 1488.

==== Junior branch ====
The junior branch possessed more substantial assets and exercised incomparably greater political influence. Franz, already mentioned, was Schultheissof Thun (1423–1426), entered the Small Council in 1427, and served as a delegate to the Diet. The line continued with his sons Kaspar and Niklaus. Hans Rudolf von Scharnachtal, Niklaus's son, incurred heavy debts, which forced his son Hans Beat (died 1541) to mortgage and sell parts of the family patrimony. The branch became extinct in the male line in 1590 with Niklaus, son of Hans Beat.

== Bibliography ==
- K.L. von Sinner, Versuch einer diplomatischen Geschichte der Edlen von Scharnachtal, 1823
- U.M. Zahnd, Die Bildungsverhältnisse in den bernischen Ratsgeschlechtern im ausgehenden Mittelalter, 1979
- F. de Capitani, Adel, Bürger und Zünfte im Bern des 15. Jahrhunderts, 1982
- R. Gerber, Gott ist Burger zu Bern, 2001
- Neue Deutsche Biographie, vol. 22, pp. 572–573
