= Hotel Adler =

Hotel in Murten, Switzerland

- Industry: Hotel
- Founded: 1396; 630 years ago
- Headquarters: Hauptgasse 45, CH-3280 Murten, Switzerland
- Website: hotel-adler.ch/en/

Hotel Adler is a traditional hotel located in the Old Town of Murten, Fribourg canton, Switzerland, the first written record about it is from 1396.

The hotel was visited by many famous people including:

- 1471 – Jacques of Savoy, Count of Romont
- 1476 – Adrian von Bubenberg
- 1760 – Casanova
- 1786 – Johann Wolfgang von Goethe.

In 2012 the building was renovated and all rooms were decorated by an artist.

== See also ==
- List of oldest companies
