= Hans Rudolf von Scharnachtal =

Bernese politician and military commander

Avoyer of Berne
- In office 1507–1512

Member of the Small Council
- In office 1488–1512

Member of the Grand Council
- In office 1486–1512

Personal details
- Died: 30 May 1512 Berne
- Spouse(s): Verena von Bonstetten (m. 1487) Philiberte de Lugny (m. 1510–1511)
- Parent: Niklaus von Scharnachtal

Hans Rudolf von Scharnachtal (died 30 May 1512 in Berne) was a Swiss politician and military commander who served as Avoyer of Berne from 1507 to 1512. He was the son of Niklaus von Scharnachtal and married twice: first in 1487 to Verena von Bonstetten, daughter of Andreas Roll, and second in 1510/1511 to Philiberte de Lugny of Burgundy.

== Political and military career ==
Scharnachtal began his political career as a member of the Grand Council in 1486, advancing to the Small Council in 1488. He served as Avoyer of Berne from 1507 to 1512, alternating in this position with other officials. As a territorial lord, he held the domains of Oberhofen, Krattigen, Schwanden bei Brienz, and from 1501, Hünigen.

In 1496, Scharnachtal was knighted by Maximilian I at Pisa. During the Swabian War in 1499, he commanded Berne's auxiliary troops. In his capacity as Avoyer, he pronounced judgment on 23 May 1509 in the Jetzer affair, a notable case involving allegations of fraudulent apparitions at a Dominican convent in Berne.

== See also ==
- von Scharnachtal

== Bibliography ==
- Sammlung bernischer Biographien, vol. 1 (1884), p. 161
- von Rodt, Genealogien, supplement, p. 232
- Feller, Bern, vols. 1–2
- K. Streun, "Das Testament des Hans Rudolf von Scharnachtal 1506", in BZGH, vol. 55 (1993), pp. 157–201
