= Kaspar von Mülinen =

Bernese politician (1481–1538)

Member of the Small Council of Bern
- In office 1517–1527

Vogt of Grandson
- Incumbent
- Assumed office 1509

Vogt of Orbe-Echallens
- In office 1510–1515

Avoyer of Berthoud
- In office 1500–1506

Personal details
- Born: 4 January 1481 Bern, Old Swiss Confederacy
- Died: 15 March 1538 (aged 57) Bern, Old Swiss Confederacy
- Spouse: Verena von Diesbach
- Parent(s): Hans Friedrich von Mülinen; Barbara von Scharnachtal

Kaspar von Mülinen (4 January 1481 – 15 March 1538) was a Bernese politician and diplomat who served in various administrative positions in the early 16th century and was involved in foreign service despite prohibitions from the Council of Bern.

== Early life and family ==
Kaspar von Mülinen was born on 4 January 1481 in Bern to Hans Friedrich von Mülinen and Barbara von Scharnachtal, heiress of the lordship of Brandis. In 1500, he married Verena von Diesbach, daughter of Ludwig von Diesbach.

== Political career ==
Von Mülinen became a member of the Grand Council of Bern in 1500. The same year, he was appointed Avoyer of Burgdorf, a position he held until 1506. He subsequently served as bailiff of Grandson in 1509 and bailiff of Orbe-Echallens from 1510 to 1515. In 1517, he was elected to the Small Council of Bern, where he served until 1527.

== Diplomatic missions and foreign service ==
A skilled negotiator, von Mülinen was entrusted with diplomatic missions to Savoy, Ferrara, and Montferrat in Piedmont. In 1506, he undertook a pilgrimage to Jerusalem, where he was knighted. Despite a prohibition from the Council of Bern, he entered the service of Duke Ulrich of Württemberg in 1516. Until the defeat at the Battle of Pavia in 1525, von Mülinen defended the interests of France.

== Religious controversy and exclusion from Council ==
Although an opponent of the Reformation, von Mülinen participated as a Bernese representative at the Disputation of Baden in 1526. In 1527, he was excluded from the council due to his intransigence on religious questions. Von Mülinen is depicted in the Dance of Death by Niklaus Manuel.

== Bibliography ==
- von Stürler, Geschlechter, vol. 2
- Sammlung bernischer Biographien, vol. 3, 1898, p. 615
- Feller, Bern, vols. 1–2
- von Rodt, Genealogien, vol. 4
