= Twingherrenstreit =

1469–71 conflict in Bern

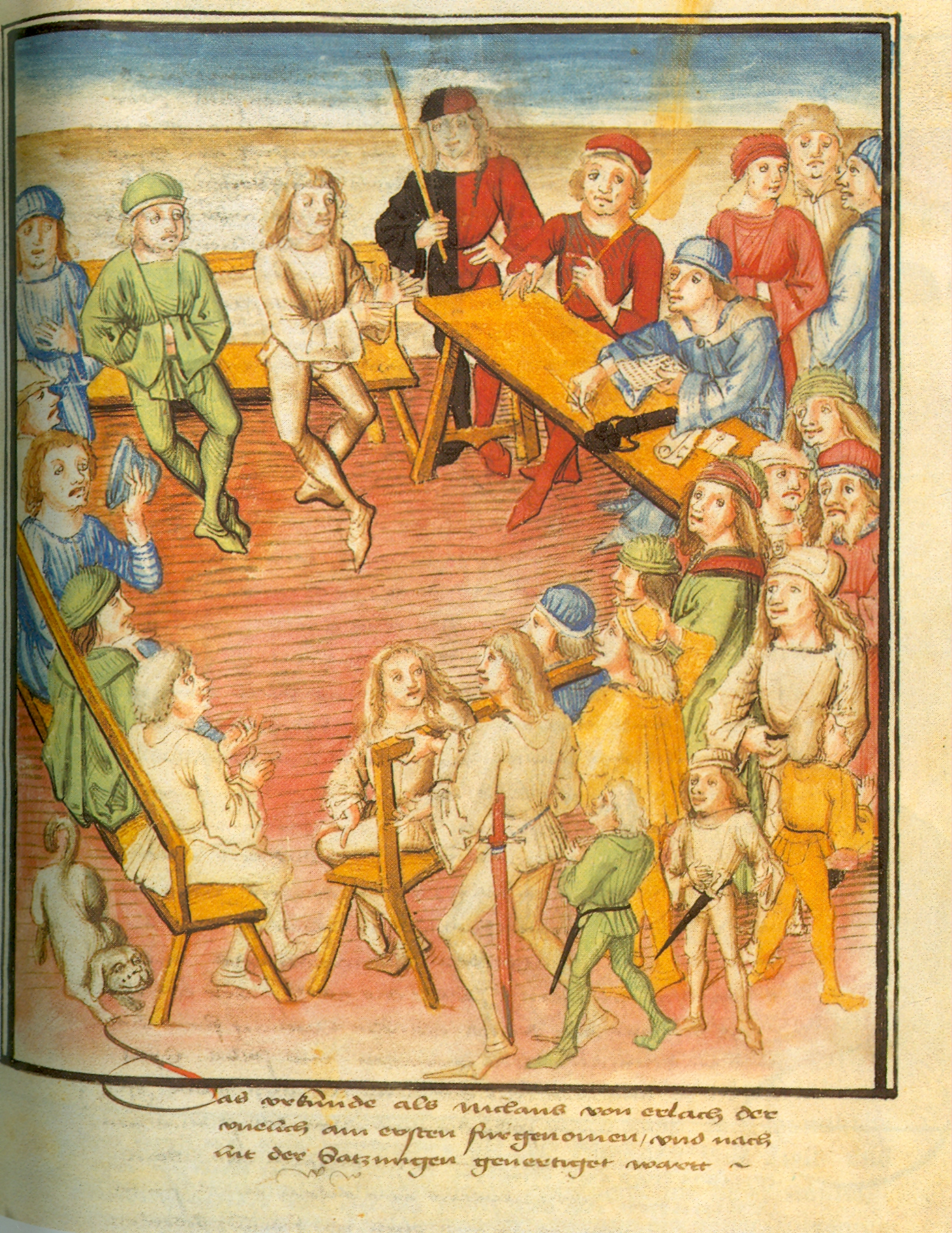
- Date: December 1469 – February 1471
- Location: Bern, Old Swiss Confederacy
- Type: Political conflict
- Participants: Bern city government, noble justiciers
- Outcome: Compromise between city authorities and nobility

The Twingherrenstreit was a political conflict that took place in Bern between 1469 and 1471. It represented a decisive stage in the assertion of the city of Bern's authority in its four jurisdictions (Landgerichte), where numerous lordships of lower justice remained.

== Background and outbreak ==
In December 1469, a new regulation concerning high and low justice gave the city supreme competence. This regulation provoked resistance from judicial lords who had played a major role in the city's government, including Adrien I de Bubenberg, Niklaus von Diesbach, and Niklaus von Scharnachtal.

On Easter Monday (April 1470), the Grand Council elected the master butcher Peter Kistler as avoyer rather than one of the four lords in contention. The council also renewed a mandate from 1464 concerning clothing, which was directed against the nobility.

== Escalation ==
The lords withdrew to their lands and threatened to renounce their bourgeoisie of Bern. On November 25, 1470, they ostentatiously violated the sumptuary law and were consequently banished from the city for one month.

== Resolution ==
In mid-December 1470, the conflicting parties agreed to meet with Confederate arbiters at Köniz. The nobles returned to the city on January 6, 1471, and an agreement was reached with them in early February. On Easter Monday 1471, the council elected the noble Petermann von Wabern as avoyer, and the following week it abolished the sumptuary mandate.

== Historical documentation ==
The conflict is known less through the acts of the municipal chancellery than through an account by Thüring Fricker, secretary of the city. This text, which immediately takes the side of the lords, has strongly influenced posterity's judgment of the affair.

== Bibliography ==
- Utz Tremp, K. (1991). "Die befleckte Handfeste". In H. Haeberli & Ch. von Steiger (Eds.), Die Schweiz im Mittelalter in Diebold Schillings Spiezer Bilderchronik (pp. 135–150).
- Schmid, R. (1995). Reden, rufen, Zeichen setzen.
- Beer, E.J., et al. (Eds.). (1999). Berns grosse Zeit (pp. 232, 333–336).
