= Wilhelm von Diesbach =

Bernese politician and military leader

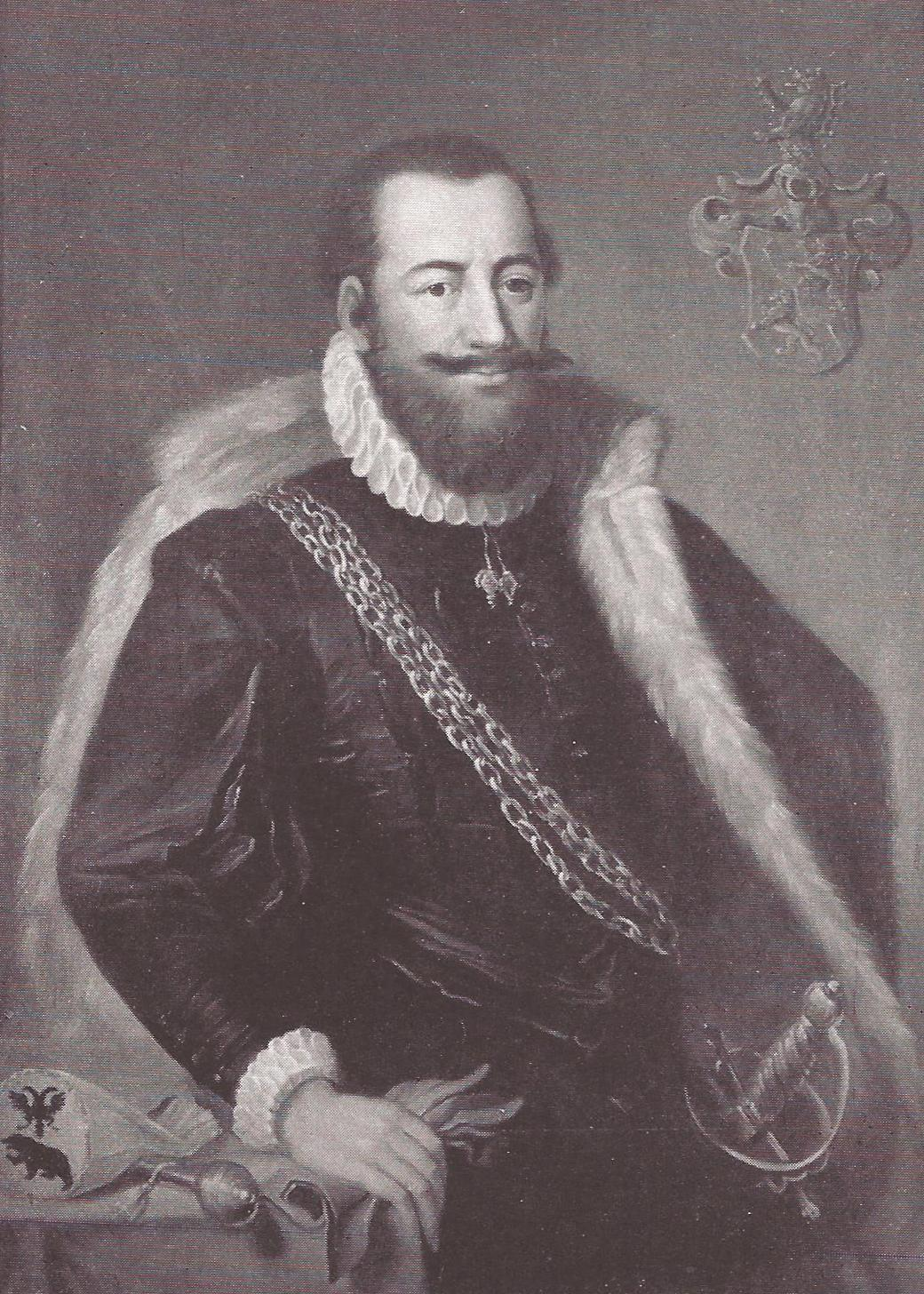

Avoyer of Bern
- In office 1481–1517

Personal details
- Born: 1442 Bern, Old Swiss Confederacy
- Died: 28 December 1517 Bern, Old Swiss Confederacy
- Spouses: Dorothea von Hallwyl (m. 1471); Helene von Freiberg (m. 1479/1480); Anastasia Schwend (m. 1501)
- Parent(s): Ludwig von Diesbach; Elisabeth von Runs
- Relatives: Ludwig von Diesbach (brother); Niklaus von Diesbach (cousin)

Wilhelm von Diesbach (1442 – 28 December 1517) was a prominent Bernese politician, diplomat, and military commander during the late 15th and early 16th centuries. He served multiple terms as Avoyer (chief magistrate) of Bern and played a significant role in Swiss military campaigns and diplomatic relations with France and Savoy.

== Early life and education ==
Wilhelm von Diesbach was born in 1442 in Bern, the son of Ludwig von Diesbach, a knight of the Order of Saint John of Jerusalem and member of the Small Council of Bern, and Elisabeth von Runs. His brother was Ludwig von Diesbach. Raised in the household of his cousin Niklaus von Diesbach, Wilhelm served as a page in the house of the Count of Foix and studied in Paris before being admitted to the Council of the Two Hundred in Bern in 1466.

== Political career ==
Diesbach became a member of the Small Council in 1475 and rose through the ranks to become second counsellor (1478) and first counsellor (1492–1498) of the Small Council. He served as Avoyer of Bern during five separate terms: 1481–1492, 1498–1501, 1504–1507, 1510–1512, and 1515–1517. He held lordships over Worb, Signau, Holligen, and Diesbach. In 1469, the last parcels of the Diesbach lordship became family property, and in 1476 he acquired the lordship of Twann, half of which he sold in 1487.

In 1467, during a pilgrimage to Jerusalem with his cousin Niklaus, both men were knighted. The following year, Diesbach received a pension from the King of France. A fervent supporter of Bern's Francophile policy, he participated in 1470 in negotiations that led to the revision of the 1463 Treaty of Abbeville between Louis XI and the House of Savoy. His missions frequently took him to France and Savoy.

== Military campaigns ==
During the Burgundian Wars, Diesbach distinguished himself particularly during the conquest of the lands of the Count of Romont in 1475. He participated as an envoy in peace negotiations between Savoy and Geneva and was part of the embassy sent to the King of France by the Confederate states. In 1478, he joined Adrian I von Bubenberg in the Bellinzona campaign, leading 3,000 men to the city gates; the same year, he served as a delegate to the Diet of Zürich.

During the conflict between the King of France and the House of Habsburg, Diesbach led the 1480 expedition to Chalon in the Franche-Comté. In 1484, he participated in concluding an alliance with King Charles VIII of France. Diesbach also played an arbitration role in Bernese and Confederate disputes, notably in the conflict between Bern and Fribourg regarding the administration of their common bailiwicks.

In 1490, he was part of the delegation sent to Charles VIII to resolve the Savoy question, and in 1495 he was dispatched with Adrian II von Bubenberg to the Imperial Diet of Worms. During the Swabian War of 1499, Diesbach commanded the Bernese troops.

== Ecclesiastical and financial affairs ==
In 1485, Diesbach negotiated an agreement with the Teutonic Knights for the transformation of Saint-Vincent of Bern into a collegiate chapter under the direction of a provost.

Diesbach's fortune—he was the wealthiest man in Bern according to his 1494 tax assessment—came primarily from investments in mining enterprises. However, his involvement in alchemical ventures led him into financial difficulties. As a skilled diplomat, both respected and criticized, he profited from foreign service and pensions.

== Personal life ==
Diesbach married three times: first to Dorothea von Hallwyl in 1471, then to Helene von Freiberg in 1479/1480, and finally to Anastasia Schwend in 1501. He died on 28 December 1517 in Bern.

== Bibliography ==
- Moser, F.A. Ritter Wilhelm von Diesbach. 1930.
- Chronika des edeln Geschlechts derer von Diesbach. Monumenta Historiae Bernensis (MHB).
- von Rodt. Genealogien. Vol. 1, p. 194.
