= The Battle of Nancy =

1831 painting by Eugène Delacroix

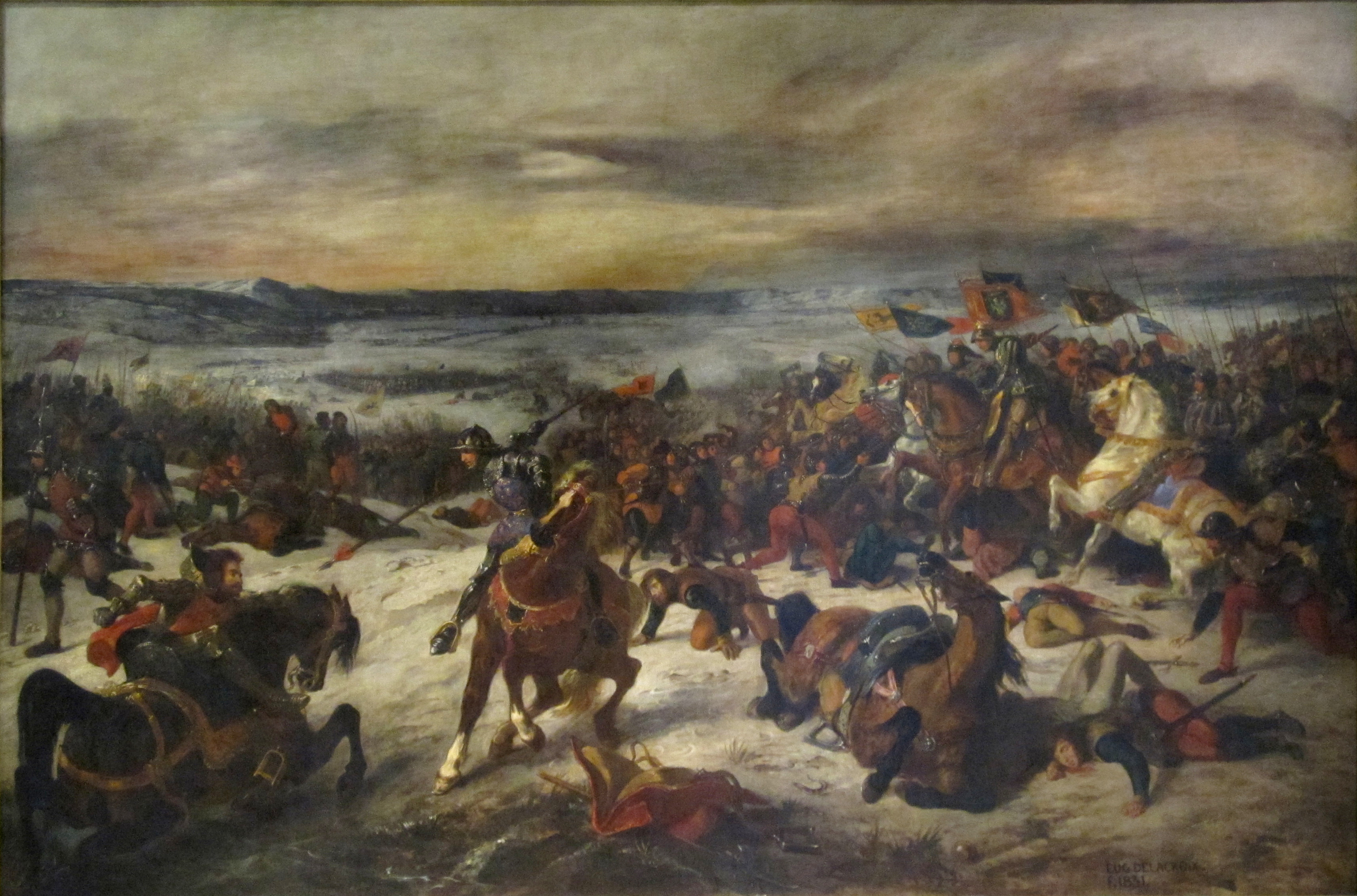
- Artist: Eugène Delacroix
- Year: 1831
- Location: Musée des Beaux-Arts de Nancy

The Battle of Nancy is an 1831 painting by the French artist Eugène Delacroix, showing the 1477 Battle of Nancy and the death of Charles the Bold. It is now in the Musée des Beaux-Arts de Nancy. Nancy's 'société royale des sciences, lettres et arts' suggested three possible subjects – the battle itself, Lorraine's victory over the Burgundians or the discovery of Charles the Bold's body. Delacroix chose the first of these, but did not go to Nancy in person, instead basing the work on several preparatory sketches of medieval weapons and costumes, of scenes from literature such as Walter Scott's Anne of Geierstein and of topographical maps provided by Baron Schwiter.

The work is also notable for its frequent occurrence as cover art:

- Gérard Chaliand (ed.) (preface by Lucien Poirier), The Art of War in World History : From Antiquity to the Nuclear Age, University of California Press, 1994, 1072 p. (ISBN 0-520-07963-9 et 0-520-07964-7).
- the 1997 first edition of Pierre Naudin's novel Les Fils de Bélial (ISBN 2-908650-46-0).
- the 1999 Japanese translation of Martin Monestier's Duels
