= Conrad von Scharnachtal =

15th-century Bernese nobleman

- Died: 1472
- Occupations: Nobleman, traveler
- Known for: Extensive travels across Europe and the Holy Land
- Relatives: Heinzmann von Scharnachtal (father); Kaspar von Scharnachtal (cousin); Niklaus von Scharnachtal (cousin)

Conrad von Scharnachtal (died 1472) was a Bernese patrician and traveler who undertook multiple extensive journeys across Europe and the Holy Land during the mid-15th century. Son of Heinzmann and cousin of Kaspar von Scharnachtal and Niklaus von Scharnachtal, he was raised at the court of Savoy, which he continued to serve occasionally throughout his life.

== Life and travels ==
Rather than pursuing a political career in Bern, Scharnachtal chose to dedicate himself to extensive travel, undertaking four or five major journeys between 1433 and 1459. His first documented voyage took him to the Holy Land in 1433, followed by a visit to the French court in 1437–1438. In 1447–1448, he traveled through the Iberian Peninsula and the British Isles, and in 1458 he journeyed through the Holy Roman Empire.

Scharnachtal conceived of travel as an art of living characteristic of the nobility. He was particularly careful to have each stage of his journeys authenticated by official documents, ensuring proper record of his movements and activities.

== See also ==
- von Scharnachtal

== Bibliography ==
- W. Paravicini, "Seigneurs par l'itinérance?", in L'itinérance des seigneurs (XIVe-XVIe s.), ed. A. Paravicini Bagliani et al., 2003, pp. 27–71
