= Battle of Nancy =

Part of the Burgundian Wars, 1477

Coordinates: 48°40′36″N 6°11′58″E

- Part of the Burgundian Wars
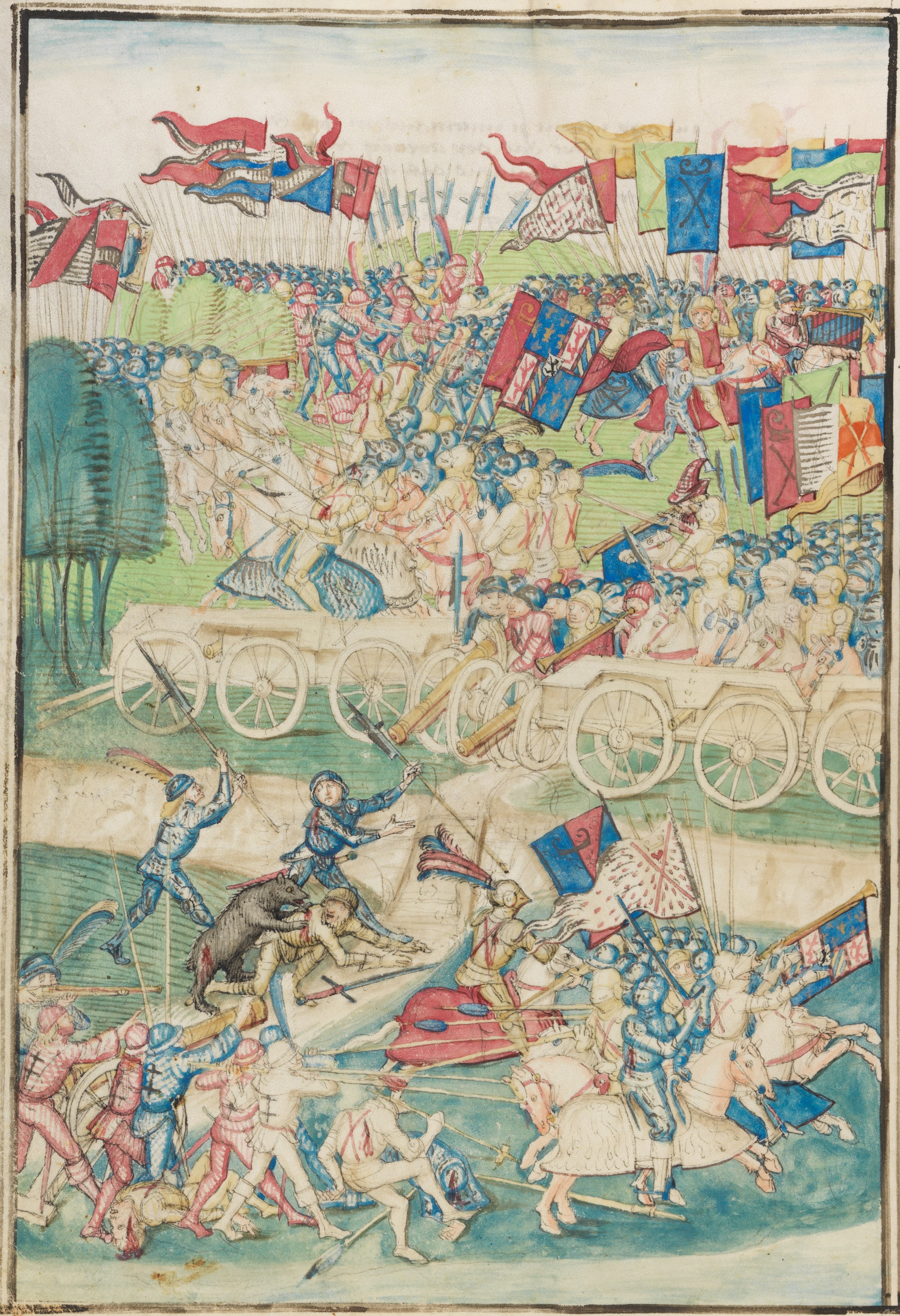
- Miniature from the Berner Chronik, c. 1480. Bernese troops (bottom left, symbolized by a bear) and their allies (top left) attack the Burgundian army
Date	5 January 1477
Location	Outside the walls of Nancy, now in France
Result	Lorraine-Swiss victory: Death of Charles the Bold; End of the Burgundian Wars; Dissolution of the Burgundian State

Belligerents
Duchy of Burgundy	Duchy of Lorraine; Old Swiss Confederacy; Imperial City of Strassburg/Lower League?

Commanders and leaders
Charles the Bold †	René II, Duke of Lorraine

Strength
2,000–8,000 men	Lorraine: 10,000–12,000 men; Swiss: 8,000–10,000 men; Alsace : 800 men

Casualties and losses
Unknown, presumably near total	Unknown

The Battle of Nancy was the final and decisive battle of the Burgundian Wars, fought on 5 January 1477 outside the walls of Nancy, Lorraine by Charles the Bold, Duke of Burgundy, against René II, Duke of Lorraine, and the Swiss Confederacy. René's forces won the battle, and Charles' mutilated body was found two days later.

== Background ==
Charles was besieging the city of Nancy, capital of Lorraine, since 22 October 1476 following its recapture by the forces of René II earlier in the year. Despite the harsh winter conditions, Charles was determined to bring the siege to an end quickly as he was well aware that soon René would arrive with a relieving army when the weather improved. The exact number of the Burgundian forces vary, but contemporary observers put the numbers between 2,000 and 8,000.

By late December René had gathered some 10,000–12,000 men from Lorraine and the Lower Union (of the Rhine), in addition to a Swiss army of 8,000–10,000. René began his advance on Nancy early in January 1477, reaching Nancy early on the morning of 5 January. Informed of the approach of René's army, Charles drew up the bulk of his army in a defensive position south of Nancy on a heavily wooded slope behind a stream, at the narrowest part of the valley down which the Swiss would have to advance.

The Burgundian infantry companies and dismounted gendarme formed up in a large square formation with some 30 field guns in front at the top of the slope, while on either flank were mounted knights and coutilliers.

The Allied scouts soon recognized that a frontal assault on the Burgundian position would be disastrous. The largely Swiss vanguard of 7,000 infantry and 2,000 cavalry were instructed to attack from the right flank, while the principal thrust would come from the 8,000 infantry and 1,300 cavalry of the center, which was dispatched on a difficult circuitous march round the left flank, over thickly wooded snow-covered slopes out of view of the waiting Burgundians. The small rearguard of 800 handgunners acted as reserve.

== Battle ==
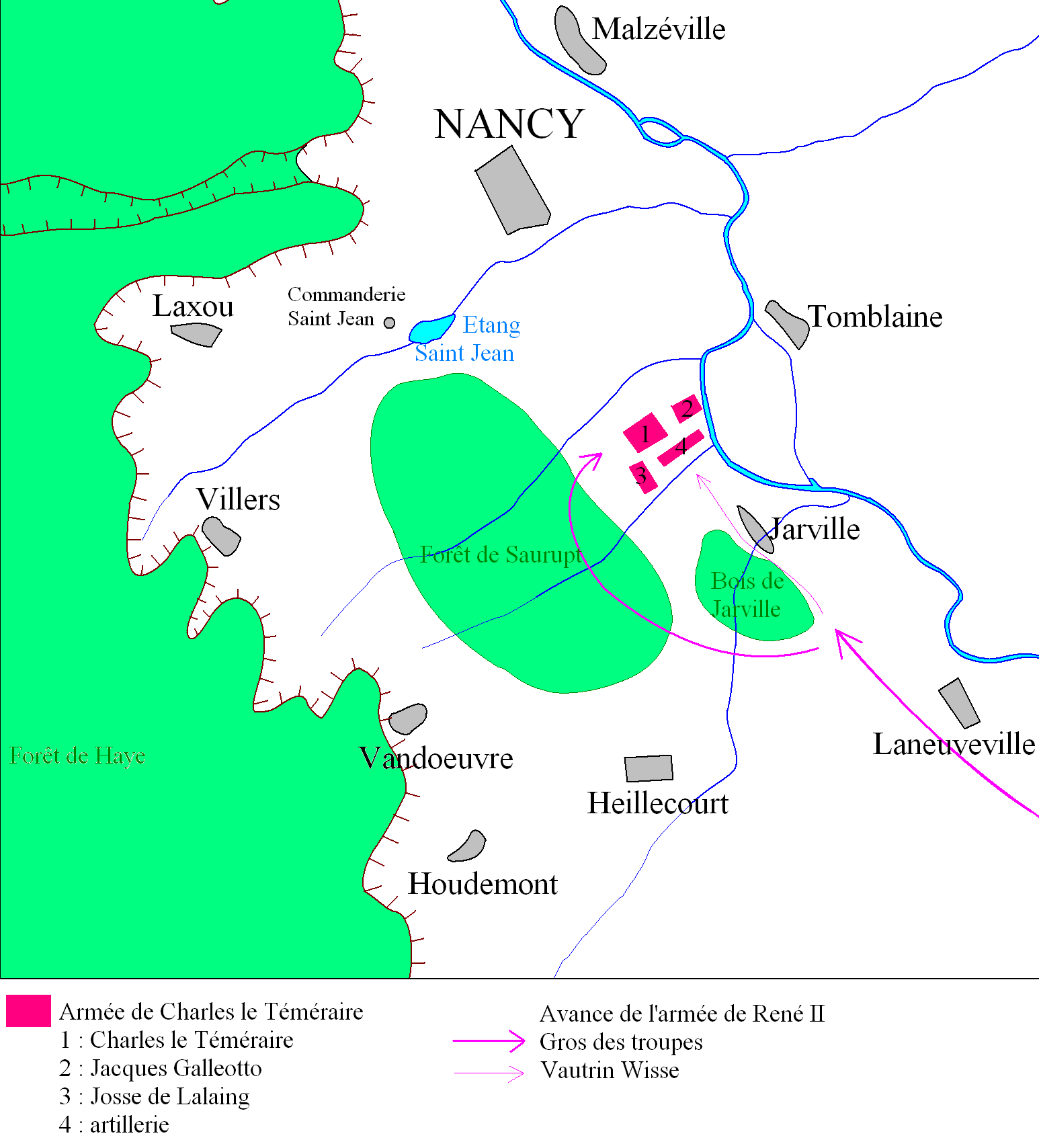
Map of the battle

After a march lasting some two hours, the center force emerged from the wooded slopes slightly to the rear of the Burgundian position and formed up in a wedge formation. The early notes of the Swiss horns sounded three times, and the Swiss charged downhill into the Burgundian positions. The artillery attempted to retrain on the center force but could not elevate enough to be effective; the single volley discharged killed but two men. Although the right-wing Burgundian cavalry held off the Swiss rivals, most of the Swiss infantry pushed on to engage the outnumbered Burgundian infantry square in a one-sided fight. The vanguard threw back the Burgundian left wing and put the artillery to flight. As Charles attempted vainly to stem the center force's advance by transferring troops from his left flank, the weight of numbers arrayed against him became overwhelming, and the Burgundian forces started to break apart and retreat.

It is thought that during the fight Charles said: "I struggle against a spider who is everywhere at once", signifying the large amount of Swiss infantry.

Charles and his staff unsuccessfully attempted to rally the Burgundian army. His small band was carried with the fleeing army until eventually surrounded by the pursuing Swiss army. A halberdier swung at the Duke's head and landed a deadly blow directly on his helmet. He was seen to fall but the battle continued, and his death went unnoticed by the opposing army. It was two days later that the Duke's body was found, already stripped by pillagers, and carried into Nancy.

Most of Charles' army was killed during the battle and their retreat. Only the few who retreated over 50 km (31 mi) to Metz survived. Contemporary chronicles record that the killing of retreating soldiers continued for three days after the battle and that for 5–6 leagues (20–30 kilometres (15–18 mi)) the road was covered with the dead. Some of the soldiers who reached Metz were reportedly still so afraid of the pursuing army that they threw themselves into the moat in the hope that they could swim to the city.

== Commemoration ==
René II built the church of Notre-Dame-de-Bonsecours on the site of the battle, and the Church of Saint-François-des-Cordeliers in Nancy itself. He furthermore built the basilica of Saint-Nicolas-de-Port to recognize the help of St. Nicholas in the battle. The city adopted the motto of non inultus premor ("I cannot be touched with impunity") and the heraldic device of a thistle as its coat of arms to commemorate the defeat of Charles the Bold.

René II also erected a cross to mark the spot where the body of Charles was found. The nearby étang Saint-Jean was drained in the 19th century, freeing the area of what is now Place de la Croix-de-Bourgogne in Nancy. The original cross was moved to the Lorraine museum. The current monument is a design by Victor Prouvé (1928).

Pierre de Blarru, canon of Saint-Dié, composed a vast poem titled La Nancéide, in 5,044 Latin verses, on the war between Burgundy and Lorraine, culminating in the battle of Nancy (first printed in 1518).

Sir Walter Scott wrote a novel, Anne of Geierstein, which reaches its climax in the battle of Nancy (published in 1829).

Eugène Delacroix painted The Battle of Nancy in 1831.

In La Malgrange (Jarville), a tower was erected in 1877 to commemorate the attack of René II.

== Gallery ==
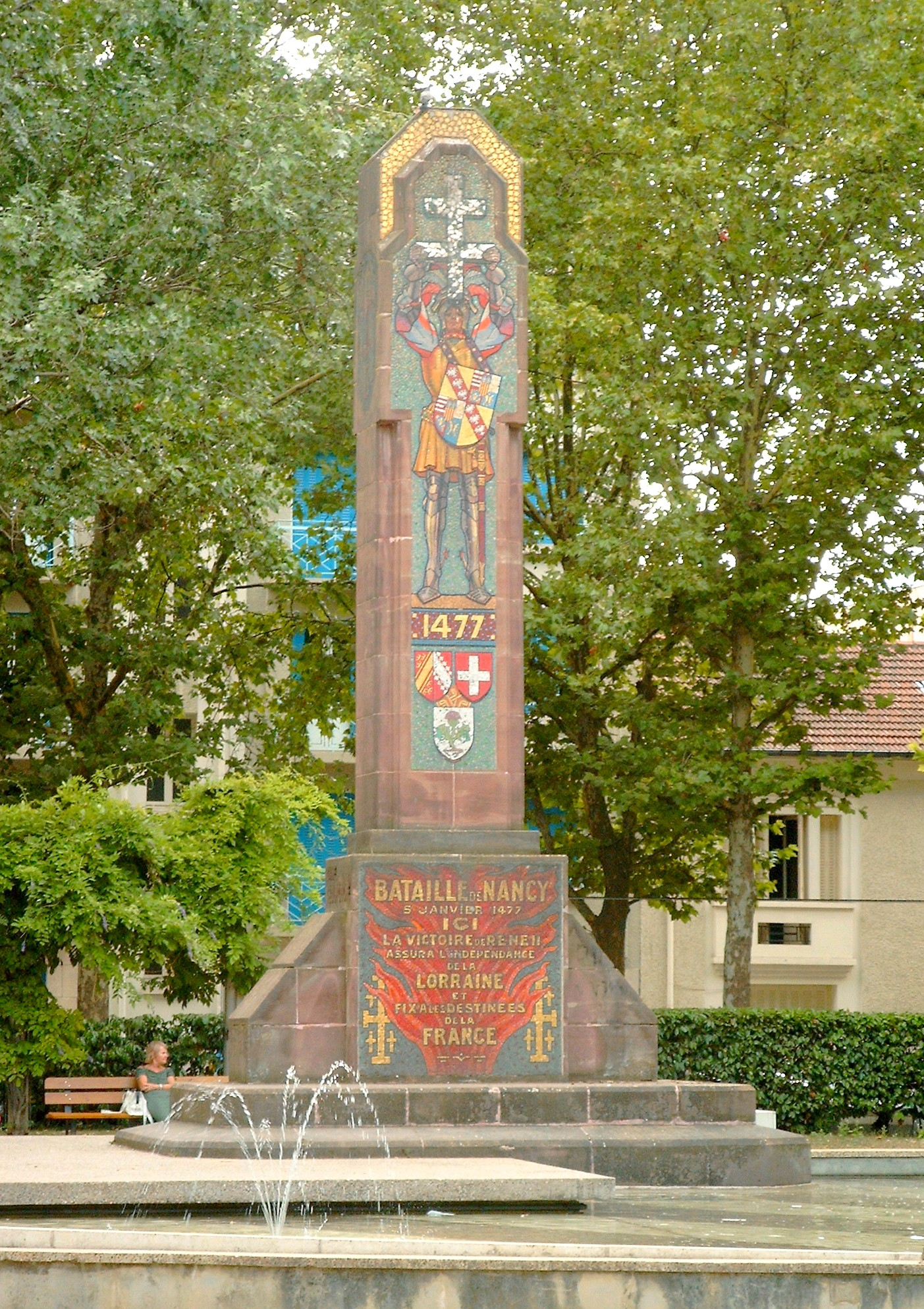
Monument to the Battle of Nancy, Place de la Croix-de-Bourgogne, Nancy

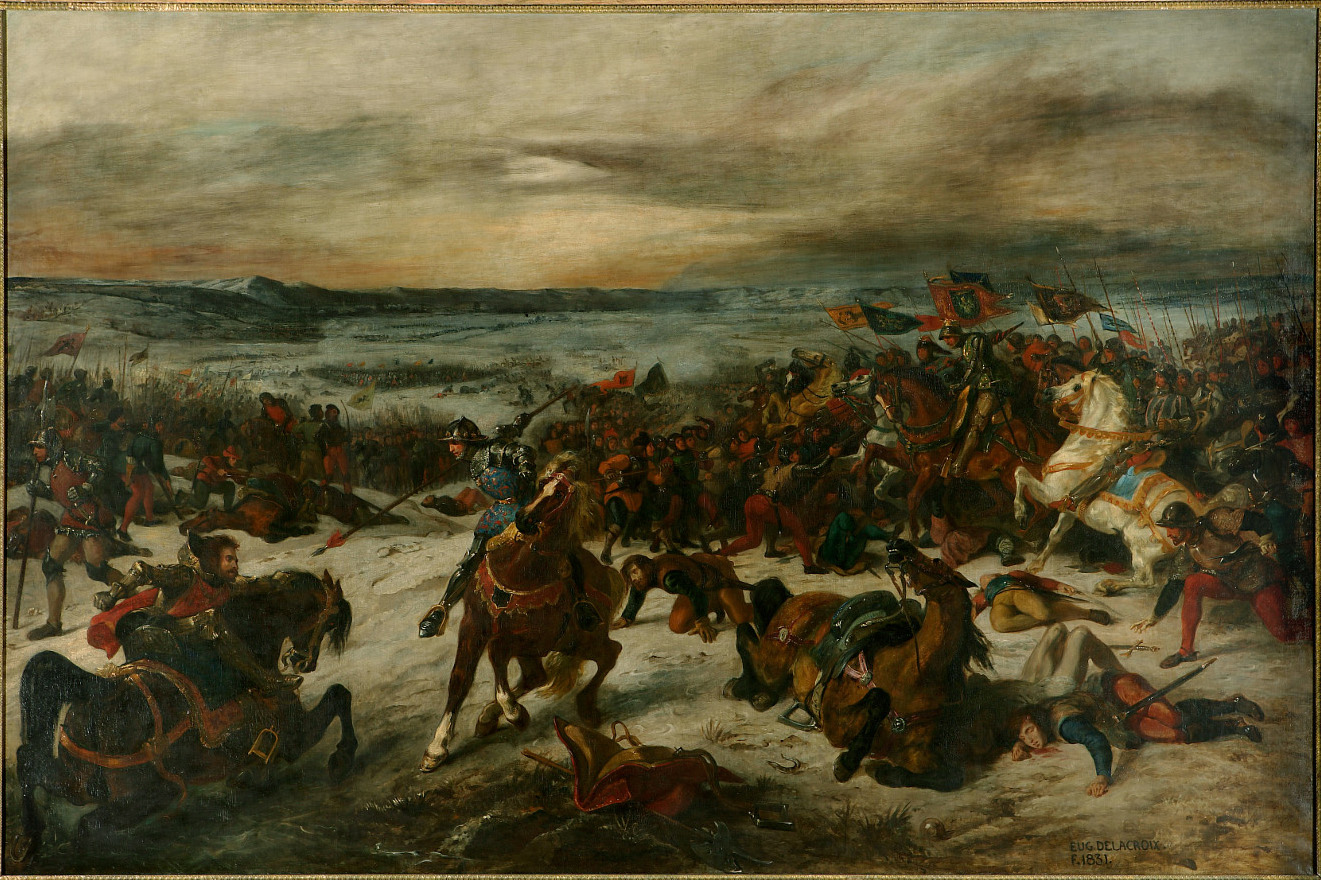
The Battle of Nancy, by Eugène Delacroix (1831)

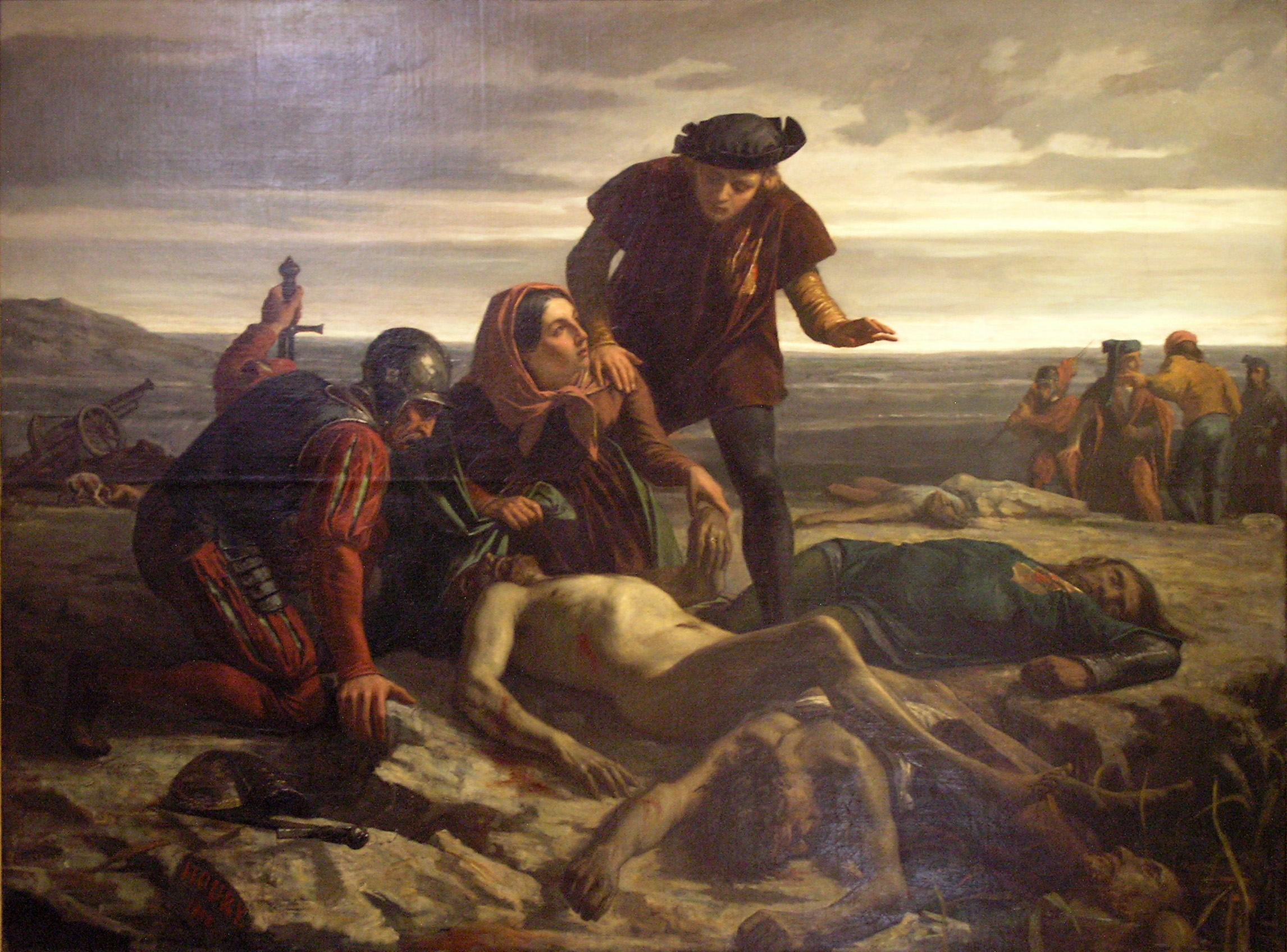
Death of Charles the Bold before Nancy, by Charles Houry (1862)

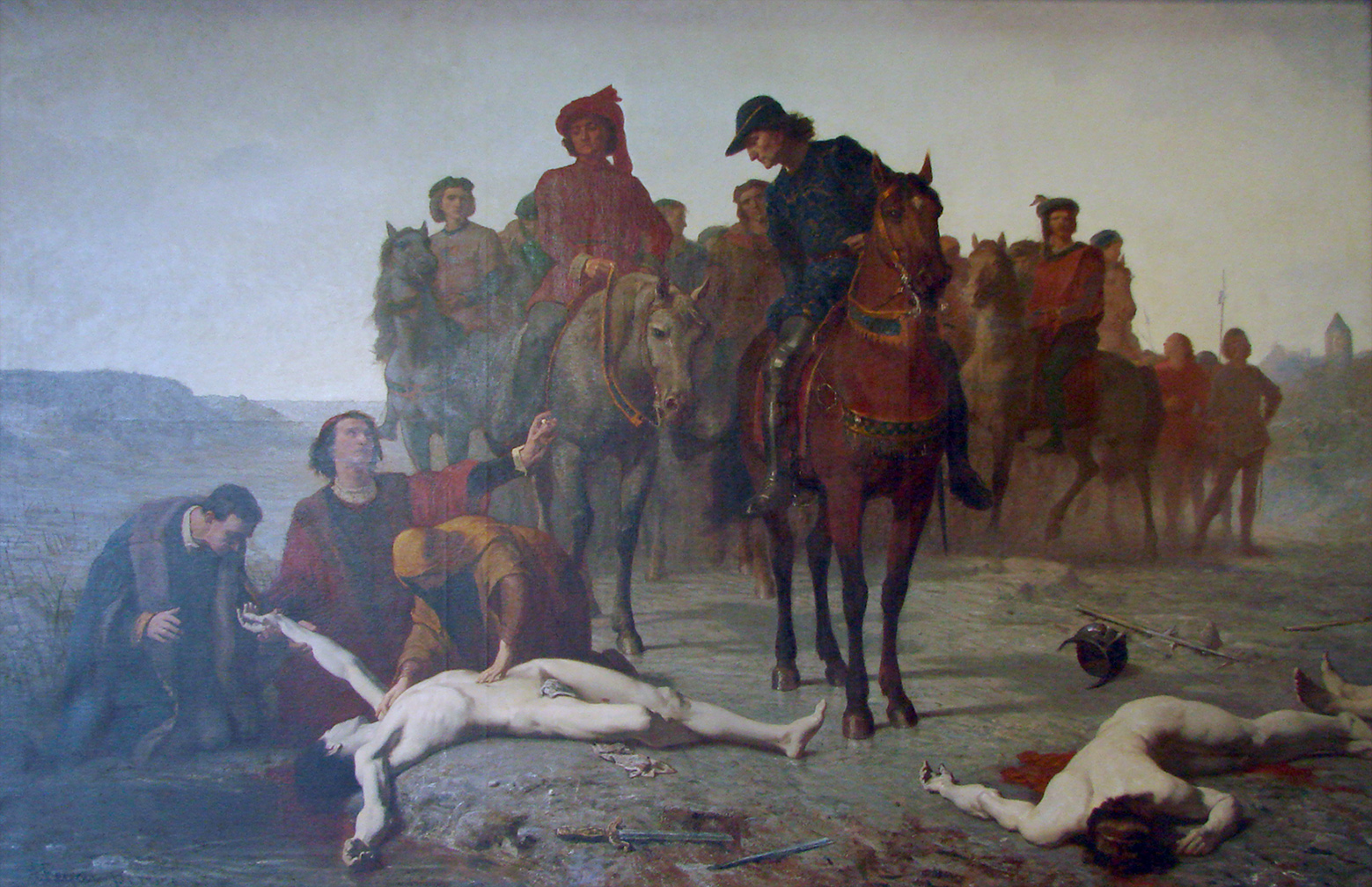
Charles the Bold found after the Battle of Nancy, by Auguste Feyen-Perrin (1865)

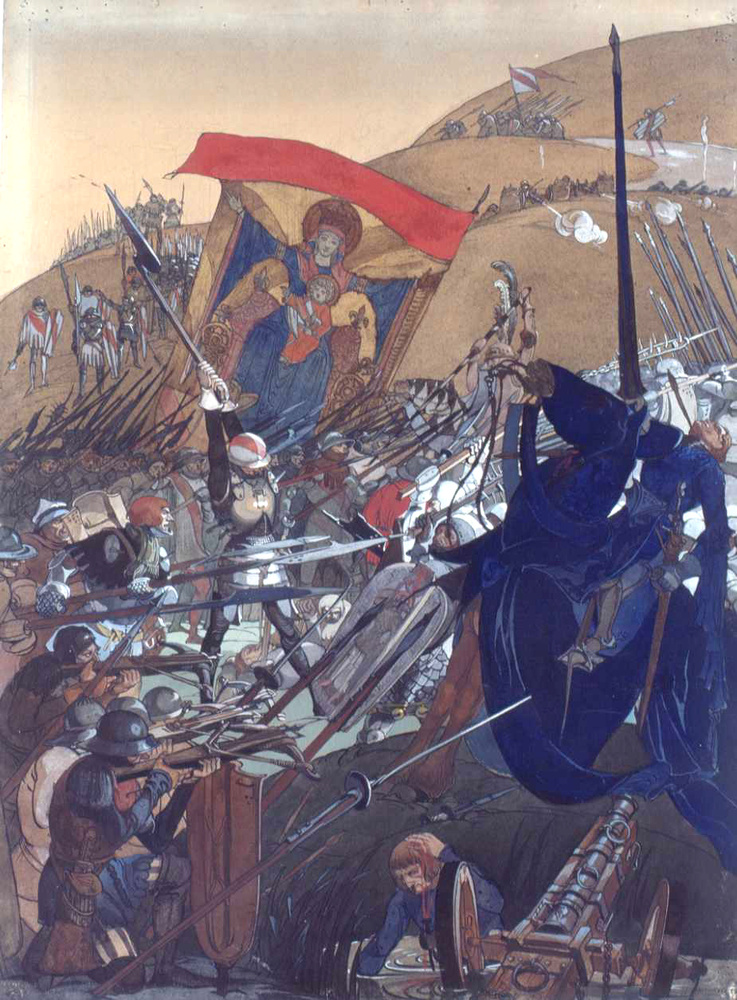
The Banner of Strasbourg at the Battle of Nancy, by Léo Schnug

== See also ==
- Battle of Grandson
- Battle of Morat
- Burgundian State
- Battles of the Old Swiss Confederacy
