= Battle of Héricourt =

Part of the Burgundian Wars

Coordinates: 47°35′N 6°46′E

- Part of the Burgundian Wars
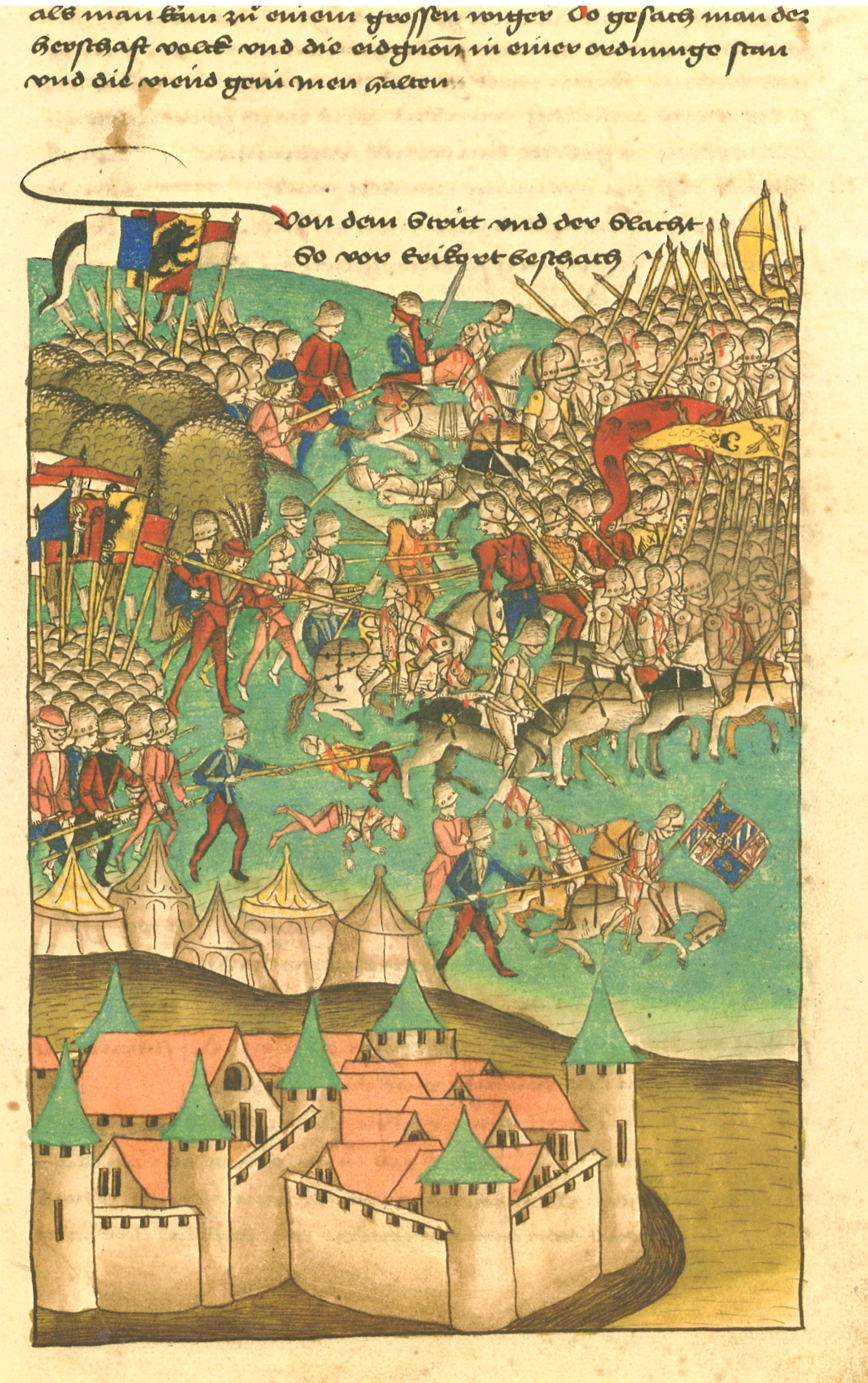
- The battle as depicted in the Zürcher Schilling
Date	13-14 November 1474
Location	Héricourt
Result	Swiss-allied victory

Belligerents
Burgundian State	Swiss Confederacy; Strasbourg; Basel; Colmar; Sélestat

Commanders and leaders
Jacques of Savoy; Henri of Neuchâtel	Niklaus von Scharnachtal

Strength
12,000	~18,000

Casualties and losses
~1,600; At least 70 captured	Light

The Battle of Héricourt was fought on 13 November 1474 near Héricourt, Burgundy, as part of the Burgundian Wars. It resulted in victory for the Swiss Confederacy and its allies over the Burgundian State.

== Battle ==
The Swiss and their allies (Lower League, Austrian cities of Alsace, Swabian imperial cities) set out on their campaign immediately after war was declared on Charles the Bold. One army entered Alsace via Basel and a second via Porrentruy. On 8 November 1474 they besieged Héricourt, which controlled the road from the Sundgau to Burgundy. They were opposed by 12,000 troops (8,000 mounted fighters and 4,000 foot soldiers) under the command of Henri of Neuchâtel and Jacques of Savoy, Count of Romont.

On 13 November at noon, the Swiss received a report of the approaching reinforcements. They broke their siege and attacked the Burgundians under the leadership of Niklaus von Scharnachtal from Bern, north of Héricourt. With the help of the Habsburg cavalry, they beat the Burgundian cavalry in two battles with little losses. When the decimated troops withdrew, the main power of the allies followed them through the valley of the Lisaine. At the same time, a smaller corps of men from Bern and Lucerne moved through the forested hills and attacked the enemy troops at Chenebier. A final battle occurred at the height of Frahier. When a defeat threatened here, too, the Burgundians fled in all directions.

Subsequently, on 16 November Héricourt's garrison surrendered and was occupied by Austrian troops. The Burgundians had lost more than three thousand men in these battles, while the Swiss had few losses. The inhabitants of the city were allowed to leave the village and take their belongings with them. The castle was handed over to Duke Sigismund of Austria.

The battle was one of the first using hand-held guns.

== See also ==
- Battles of the Old Swiss Confederacy
