= Niklaus von Scharnachtal =

Bernese politician and military leader

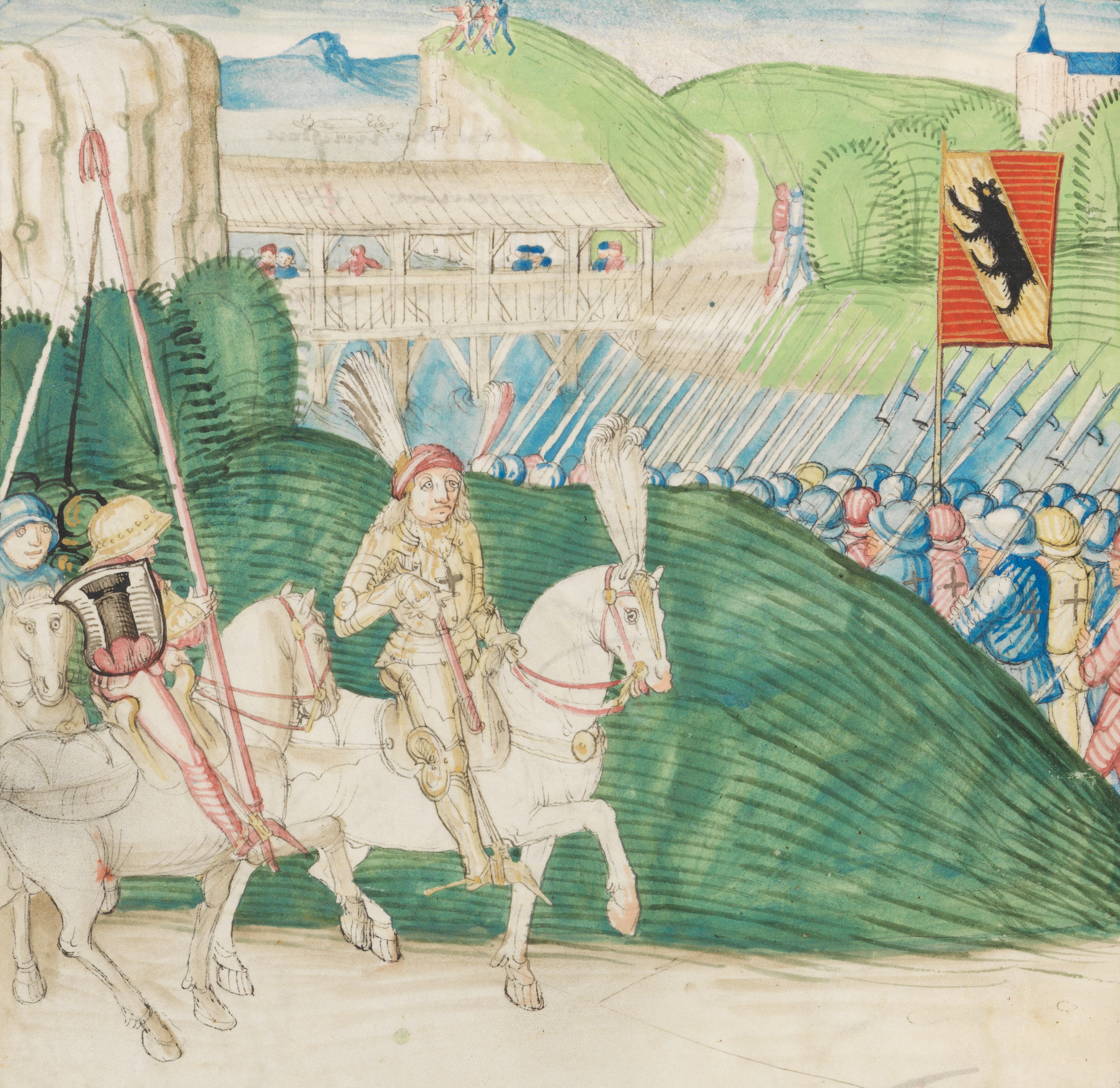

Schultheiss of Bern
- In office 1463–1472 Serving with alternating

Schultheiss of Thun
- Incumbent
- Assumed office 1458

Personal details
- Born: c. 1419
- Died: 1489
- Spouse: Anna Gruber (m. c. 1450)
- Relations: Kaspar von Scharnachtal (brother); Conrad von Scharnachtal (cousin)
- Parent(s): Franz von Scharnachtal; Margarete von Heidegg

Niklaus von Scharnachtal (c. 1419–1489) was a Bernese politician and military commander who served as Schultheiss (chief magistrate) of Bern from 1463 to 1472. He held significant seigneurial properties in the Bernese Oberland and participated in key diplomatic missions and military campaigns during the Burgundian Wars.

== Family and early life ==
Niklaus von Scharnachtal was born around 1419, the son of Franz von Scharnachtal, Schultheiss of Thun, and Margarete von Heidegg. He was the brother of Kaspar von Scharnachtal and cousin of Conrad von Scharnachtal. Around 1450, he married Anna Gruber.

== Seigneurial holdings ==
Scharnachtal was co-holder of seigneuries in the Oberland, including Wimmis, Diemtigen, and Unspunnen. He also held lordships over Schwanden, Oberhofen, and Krattigen.

== Political career ==
Scharnachtal became a member of the Grand Council in 1446 and joined the Small Council in 1451. In 1458, he was appointed Schultheiss of Thun. From 1463 to 1472, he served as Schultheiss of Bern, holding the position in alternation with other magistrates.

=== Diplomatic missions ===
As a frequent delegate to the Diet, Scharnachtal participated in several important diplomatic negotiations. In 1461, following the conquest of Thurgau, he took part in peace negotiations with Austria. In 1466, he was involved in renewing the alliance with the Duchy of Savoy. In 1474, he was sent with Petermann von Wabern to the court of Burgundy.

=== Military service ===
Scharnachtal held military commands during the Burgundian Wars. He participated in the Battle of Héricourt in 1474 and the Battle of Morat in 1476.

== Twingherrenstreit and later years ==
In 1470, during the Twingherrenstreit (dispute of the lords with judicial rights), Scharnachtal, who himself held such rights, lost his position as Schultheiss to Peter Kistler. After being struck by lightning in 1477, which left him hemiplegic, he withdrew from all his official positions in 1479.

== See also ==
- von Scharnachtal

== Bibliography ==
- Sammlung bernischer Biographien, vol. 1, 1884, p. 50
- von Rodt, Genealogien, supplement, p. 230
- Feller, Bern, vol. 1
