= Berthoud =

Berthoud may refer to:

== Places ==
- Berthoud, Colorado, US
- Berthoud Pass, Colorado, US
- Burgdorf, Switzerland (French: Berthoud)

== People ==
- Berthoud (surname)
