= Kaspar von Scharnachtal =

15th-century Bernese politician

- Born: c. 1416
- Died: Summer 1473; Bern
- Occupations: Politician, military commander
- Known for: Bailiff of Baden, Avoyer of Thun
- Spouses: Kunegund von Stein; Johanna von Reinach; Pernette de Villarzel
- Parent(s): Franz von Scharnachtal; Margarete von Heidegg
- Relatives: Niklaus von Scharnachtal (brother); Conrad von Scharnachtal (cousin)

Kaspar von Scharnachtal (c. 1416 – summer 1473) was a 15th-century Bernese politician and military commander who served as Bailiff of the Confederate territories at Baden and Avoyer of Thun.

== Family and early life ==
Kaspar von Scharnachtal was born around 1416, the son of Franz von Scharnachtal, Avoyer of Thun, and Margarete von Heidegg. He was the brother of Niklaus von Scharnachtal and cousin of Conrad von Scharnachtal. He married three times: first to Kunegund von Stein, lady of Blumenstein, second to Johanna von Reinach, and third to Pernette de Villarzel.

== Political career ==
Scharnachtal served as a member of the Small Council of Bern from 1447 to 1448. He subsequently held the position of Avoyer of Thun from 1450 to 1454. In 1455, he was appointed Bailiff of the Confederates at Baden.

That same year, Scharnachtal purchased Brandis im Emmental, a highly profitable lordship, and withdrew from active political life. By 1448, he was counted among the wealthiest citizens of Bern.

== Military service ==
Despite his retirement from politics, Scharnachtal continued to serve in military capacities. In June 1468, he commanded the Bernese cavalry in the Sundgau. The following month, he led a Bernese contingent in a march on Waldshut, where the siege was lifted in August.

== See also ==
- von Scharnachtal

== Bibliography ==
- Sammlung bernischer Biographien, vol. 1, 1884, pp. 157–160
- Gerber, R. Gott ist Bürger zu Bern, 2001
