= Frohburg Castle =

Castle in Trimbach, Switzerland

- Trimbach
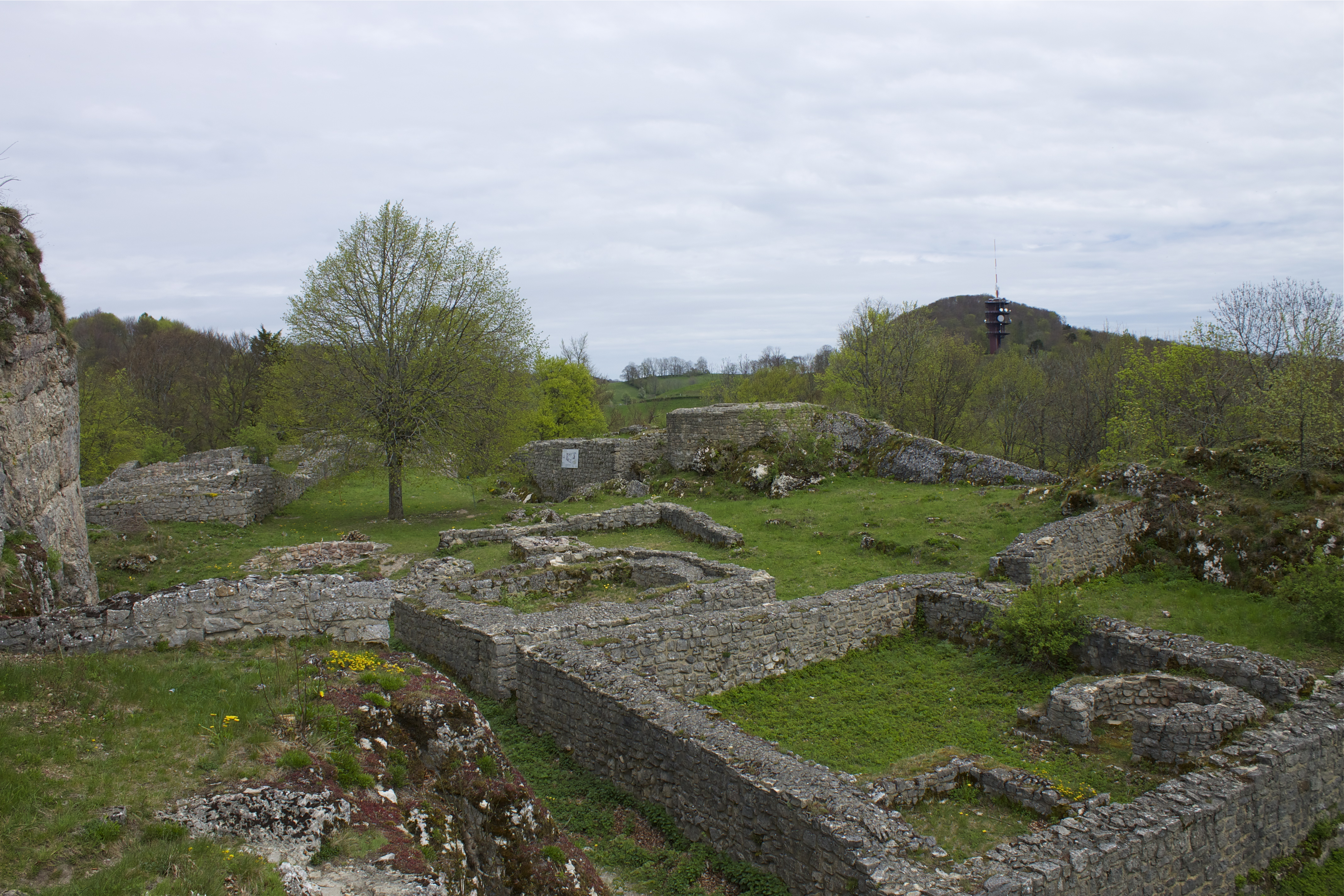
- Restored south wall

Site information
- Type: hill castle
- Code: CH-SO
- Condition: ruin

Location
- Coordinates: 47°22′45″N 7°53′24″E

Site history
- Built: c. 800 - 1100

Garrison information
- Occupants: counts

Frohburg Castle is a castle in the municipality of Trimbach of the Canton of Solothurn in Switzerland. It is a Swiss heritage site of national significance.

== See also ==
- List of castles in Switzerland
