= Bipp Castle =

Castle in Oberbipp, Switzerland

- Oberbipp
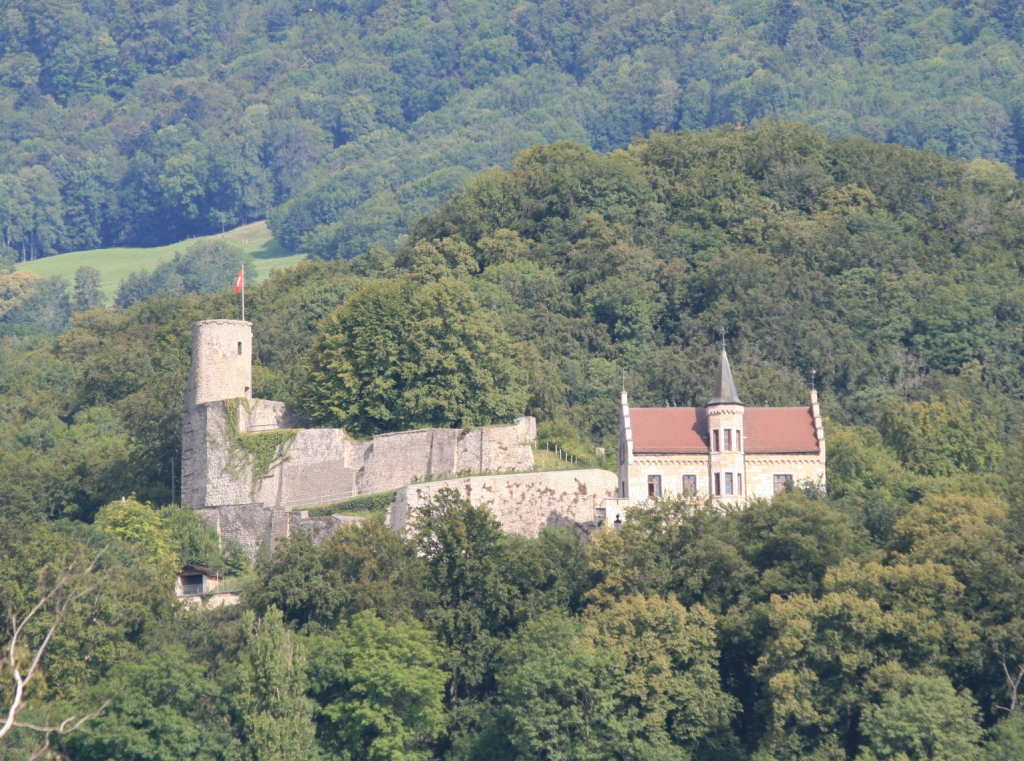
- Ruins of Bipp Castle and an 1855 addition

Site information
- Type: Hill castle
- Code: CH-BE
- Condition: Partly ruined

Location
- Coordinates: 47°15′49″N 7°39′08″E

Site history
- Built: by 1268

Garrison information
- Occupants: Ministerialis, Landvogt

Bipp Castle is a partially ruined castle in the municipality of Oberbipp of the Canton of Bern in Switzerland.

== History ==
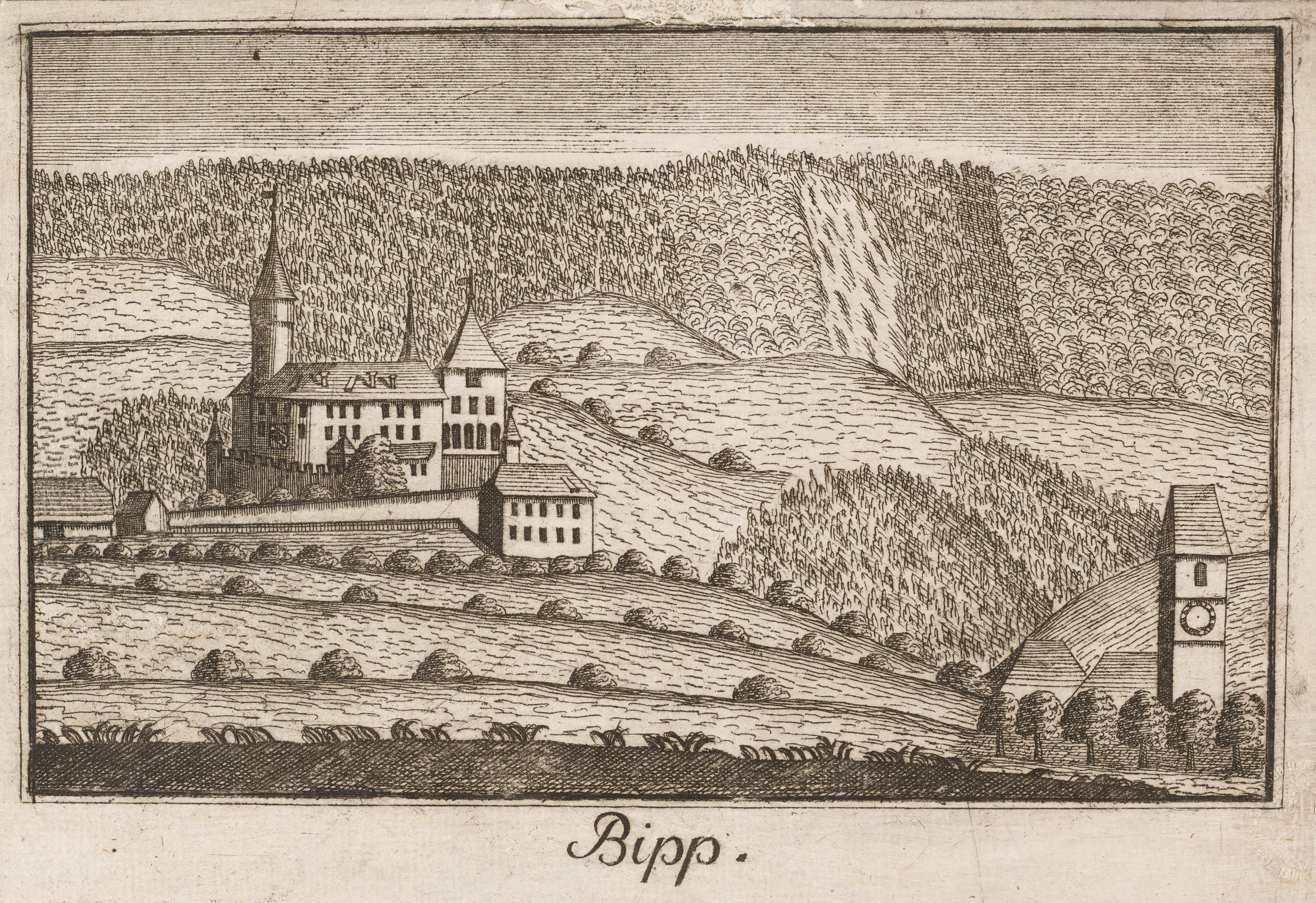
Bipp Castle in 1743

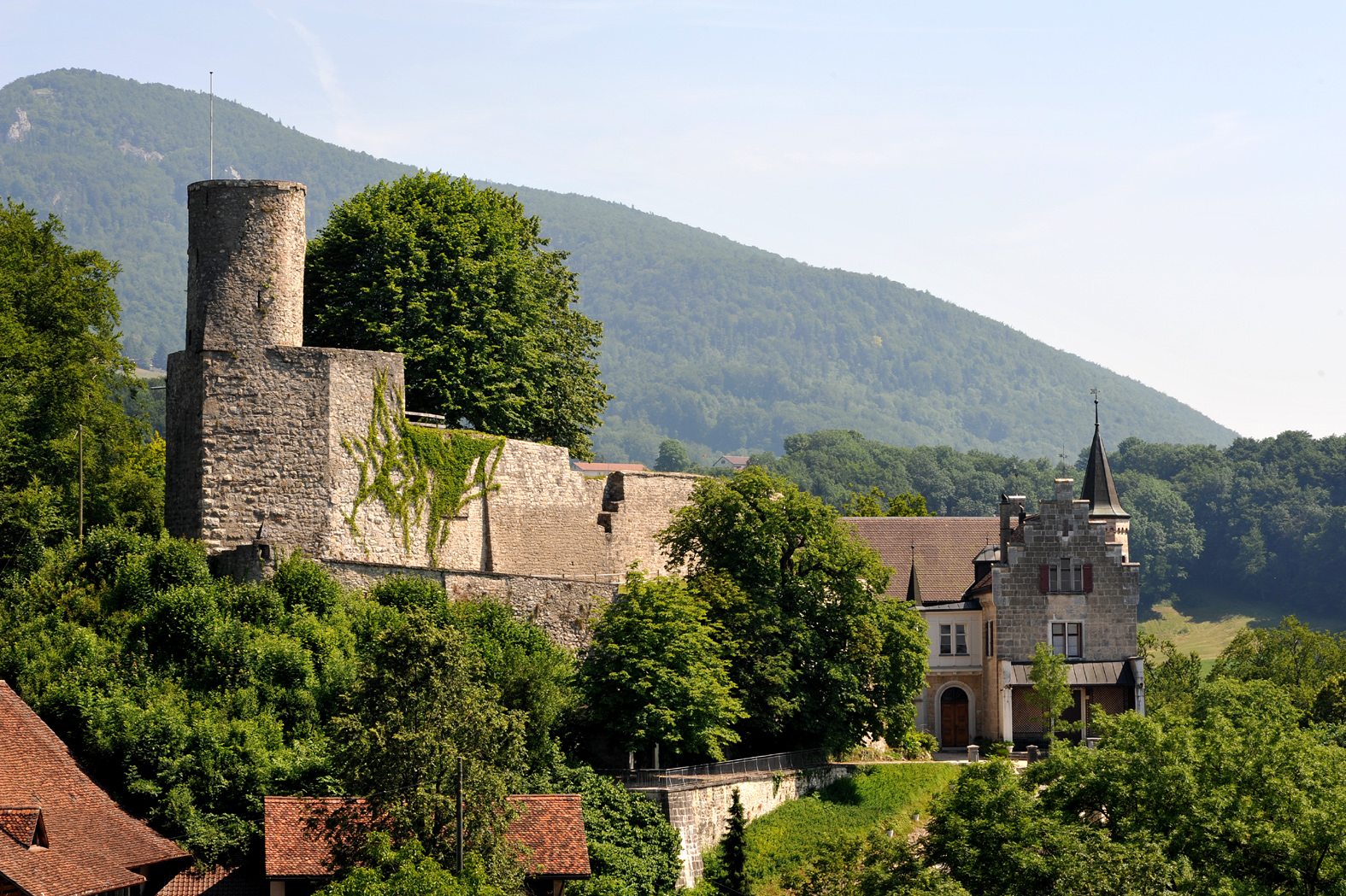
The 1855 mansion built near the ruins of Bipp Castle

During the 12th century the Bishop of Basel granted the Buchsgau region, which included the village of Oberbipp, to the Count of Froburg to hold as a fief. By 1268 Bipp Castle is first mentioned in a document. During the 13th century the counts of Froburg appear to have gradually lost most of their holdings in the Buchsgau until only the villages of Bipp, Wiedlisbach and Erlinsburg remained. At some point in the following years the Froburgs also lost ownership of Bipp Castle, though whether it was sold or captured is not clear.

In 1297 Count Rudolf of Neuchâtel-Nidau granted the castle to one of his Ministerialis knights. Then, in 1313 Rudolf's son, also a Rudolf, granted the castle and the right to collect tolls on the bridge to Aarwangen. In 1362 Count Rudolf of Nidau became the Lord of Froburg along with his other titles. However, when he died childless his estates were divided between several family members. Eventually, Rudolf of Kyburg inherited the castle and surrounding lands. Following a disastrous Kyburg raid on Solothurn which led to the Burgdorferkrieg (1383–84), the lands were sold to the Habsburgs in 1385. In the following year Bipp went to Basel and then in 1406 back to the Kyburgs, who had to sell it to Solothurn and Bern in the same year.

Until 1463 Bern and Solothurn jointly administered the nearby villages from Bipp Castle. After this, Solothurn received the Neu-Bechburg vogtei and Bipp became fully part of Bern. The castle became the seat of the Bernese ‘’landvogt’’ or reeve. Over the following three centuries a total of 62 Bernese administrators ruled over the region.

On 2 March 1798 the French Army captured Solothurn during their invasion of Switzerland. The last Bernese landvogt fled Bipp Castle ahead of the invading army. The residents of Oberbipp and Niederbipp then plundered the castle, taking everything they could carry off. A French report from 16 March 1798 records that the castle was uninhabitable because even the windows and doors had been carried off.

The ruins of Bipp Castle were sold in 1805 and were partly demolished to provide stone for other buildings. In 1855 the ruins were sold to the Stehlin family of Basel, who built a small mansion on the site of the former castle granary.

== Castle site ==
The castle was built on hill near the village of Oberbipp. The castle was an elongated polygon with a massive palas on the eastern side and a slender, round bergfried on the west, connected by a line of buildings. The northern side of the castle was a curtain wall connecting the palas and bergfried. The main wall was further protected with a lower, outer wall with several round and square towers. A granary and stables were outside the wall on the southern flank of the castle hill.

== See also ==
- List of castles in Switzerland
