= Ludwig von Diesbach =

15th-16th century Bernese nobleman

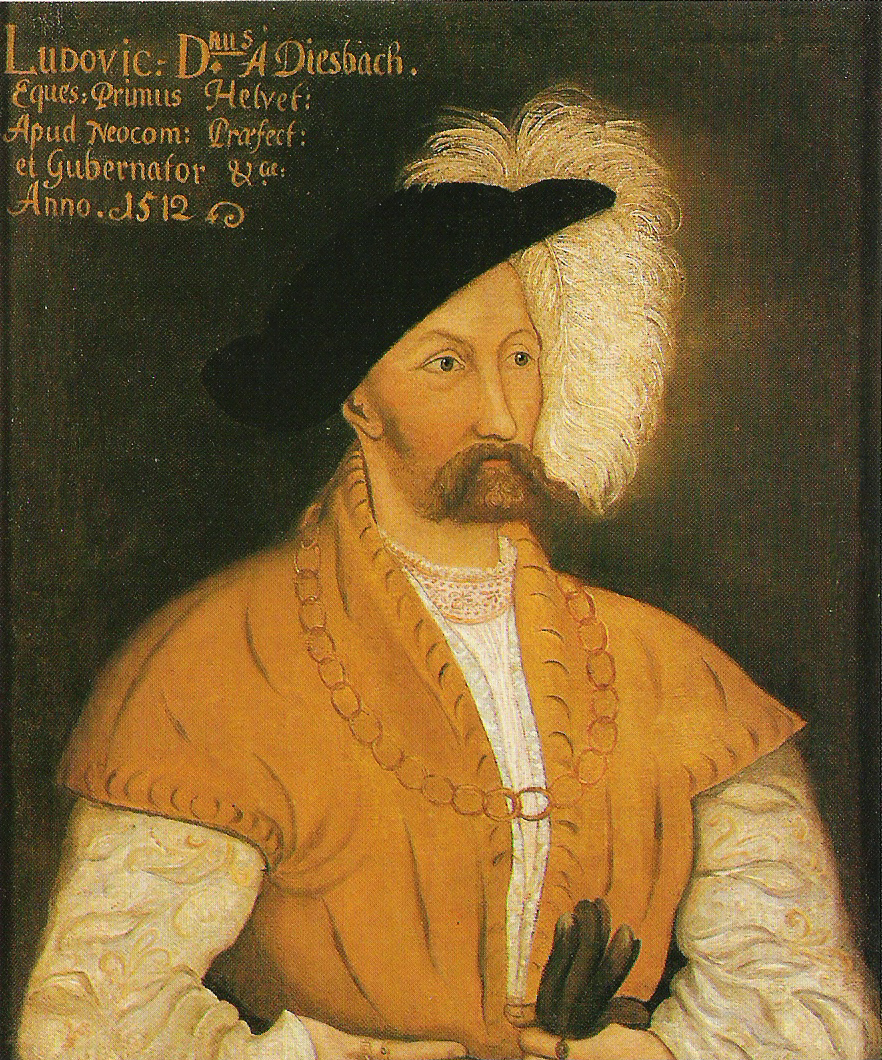
- Portrait of Ludwig von Diesbach, oil on canvas by an unknown artist, 1512
- Born: 1452; Godesberg, Lower Rhine
- Died: 10 February 1527; Bern
- Occupations: Nobleman, diplomat, bailiff
- Known for: Autobiographical writings
- Spouses: Antonia von Ringoltingen; Agatha von Bonstetten
- Parent(s): Ludwig von Diesbach; Elisabeth von Runs
- Relatives: Wilhelm von Diesbach (brother); Niklaus von Diesbach (cousin)

Ludwig von Diesbach (1452 – 10 February 1527) was a Bernese nobleman, diplomat, and author of autobiographical writings that are considered among the most remarkable personal testimonies in the German language from the late Middle Ages.

== Early life and education ==
Ludwig von Diesbach was born in 1452 in Godesberg in the Lower Rhine region. He was the son of Ludwig von Diesbach, a knight of the Order of Saint John of Jerusalem and member of the Small Council of Bern, and Elisabeth von Runs. His brother was Wilhelm von Diesbach. After being educated in Bern in the house of his cousin Niklaus von Diesbach, Ludwig spent time in Savoy and at the Court of France in the entourage of Louis XI from 1468 to 1476.

== Political and diplomatic career ==
Diesbach became a member of the Grand Council of Bern in 1480 and was appointed seizenier (a member of the council of sixteen) in 1481. He served as bailiff in Thun, Baden, and Neuchâtel, and as governor in Aigle. He led several diplomatic missions to the Court of France and the Imperial court, though he never truly belonged to the very narrow circle of Bern's ruling elite. In 1496, he was knighted during Emperor Maximilian's Italian campaign.

== Land holdings and financial difficulties ==
After inheriting Diessbach, Diesbach acquired the lordships of Landshut and Spiez. However, he encountered economic difficulties and was forced to sell these properties in 1514 and 1516.

== Autobiographical writings ==
Diesbach left autobiographical notes written after 1488 and after 1518. These writings are of great interest for cultural history and are considered among the most remarkable personal testimonies in the German language from the late Middle Ages.

== Bibliography ==
- U.M. Zahnd, Die autobiographischen Aufzeichnungen Ludwig von Diesbachs, 1986
