= Lower League =

The Lower League (Niedere Vereinigung, inferiores confederati), also known as the League of Constance, was an alliance of the Swiss cantons of Basel and Bern and the Rhenish cities of Colmar and Sélestat in association with the free imperial city of Strasbourg. The alliance was formed as a counter to Burgundian expansion spearheaded by Charles the Bold, Duke of Burgundy.

The goal of the League was to drive Charles the Bold out of the region of Alsace, which he had bought from Sigismund, Archduke of Austria in 1469. The League officially declared war on Charles the Bold on April 1474, in support of a rebellion by pro-league Alsatian cities. This led to the Burgundian Wars, which saw Charles the Bold fighting with the Swiss Confederancy until his death at the Battle of Nancy in 1477 against Duke René II of Lorraine and his army of Swiss mercenaries.

The league was named to distinguish it from the "upper" (highland) league of the Swiss Confederacy.

== Bibliography ==
- Bischoff, Georges (2012). "Les « états unis » d'Alsace. Quelques remarques sur la genèse d'un espace politique et sur les pratiques de coopération de ses composantes (XIVe-XVIIe s.)". In Buchholzer, Laurence; Richard, Olivier (eds.). Ligues urbaines et espace à la fin du Moyen Âge. pp. 121–142. ISBN 978-2868204844.
- Hooper, Nicholas; Bennett, Matthew (1996). The Cambridge Illustrated Atlas of Warfare: The Middle Ages, 768-1487. Cambridge University Press. ISBN 978-0521440493.
- Knecht, Robert (2007). The Valois: Kings of France 1328–1589. London: Bloomsbury Publishing. ISBN 9781852855222. OCLC 460822682.
- Smith, Robert Douglas; De Vries, Kelly (2005). The Artillery of the Dukes of Burgundy, 1363–1477. Rochester, New York: Boydell Press. ISBN 9781843831624. OCLC 60322326.
