= Adrian von Bubenberg =

Bernese general and mayor (1424–1479)

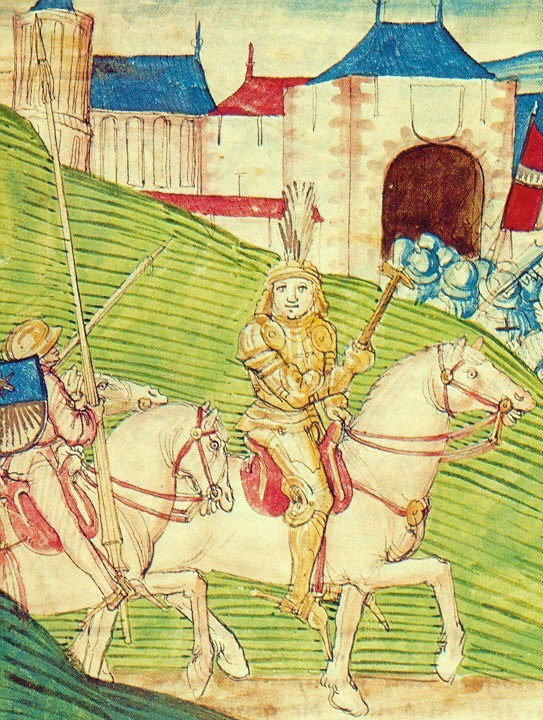
Adrian von Bubenberg on horseback (Diebold Schilling the Elder)

Adrian von Bubenberg (born c. 1424 in Bern; died August 1479 in Bern) was a Bernese knight, military commander and mayor (Schultheiss) of Bern in 1468-1469, 1473-1474 and 1477-1479. In Switzerland, he is remembered as the hero of the 1476 Battle of Murten.

== Life ==
Adrian von Bubenberg was born as the son of Heinrich IV. von Bubenberg, Schultheiss of Bern and lord of Spiez, whom he succeeded in 1465. During a pilgrimage to Jerusalem in 1466, he was dubbed a Knight of the Holy Sepulchre, and inscribed his name and emblem on the wall of David's Tomb.

Numerous times before and after the Burgundy wars, he led Bernese negotiations with other cantons of the old Swiss Confederacy and foreign powers including Savoy, Burgundy, France and the Holy Roman Empire. But his heroic stature in Swiss history is due to his tenacious defense during the siege of Murten. He had been appointed commander of the city garrison in April 1476. The city was besieged during twelve days in June by the troops of Charles, Duke of Burgundy, and Bubenberg managed to hold until he was relieved by confederate forces on 22 June, leading to the decisive defeat of Charles.

== Legacy ==
Von Bubenberg was buried in the choir of the Berner Münster, the Cathedral of Bern. Ever having been short of funds in spite of being the head of Berne's preeminent noble house, von Bubenberg was posthumously banned for his debts in 1481, but the government resisted Pope Sixtus IV's demand that he be exhumed and dishonourably buried because of this.

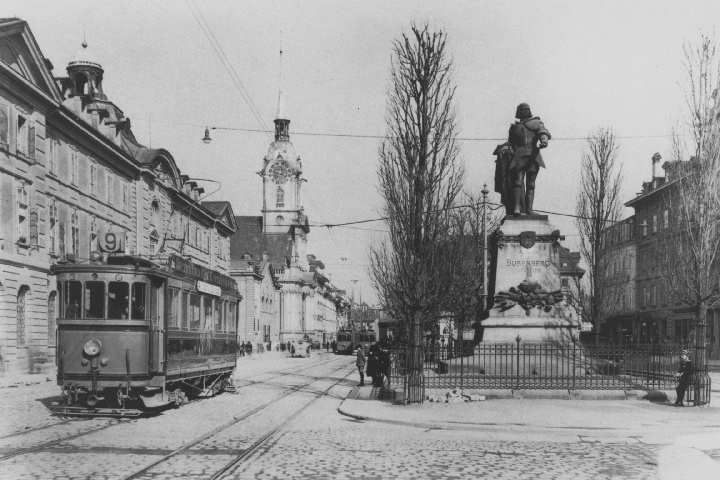
The monument in its original setting (1915 photograph)

Bubenberg's deeds figure already in the near-contemporary illustrated chronicles by Diebold Schilling the Elder. Later, he became an icon in Romantic nationalism, portrayed in literature as the ideal of knightly virtue and of patriotism, notably in the novel Ring i der Chetti by Rudolf von Tavel (1931). In 1897, Bern honoured Bubenberg with a bronze statue on Christoffelplatz, which was renamed to Bubenbergplatz on the occasion. The design for the statue triggered a dispute on whether it was proper to show Bubenberg on foot rather than as a knight in an equestrian statue. The statue was moved to the nearby Hirschengraben in 1930 to make room for tramway infrastructure; plans to move the statue triggered controversial debate in Bernese newspapers in early 1930, but the plan found popular support in a vote of 6 April, the statue was removed on 24 April and erected at its current location on 19 May.

== Exonumia ==
City of Bern produced a silver medal in 1897 in memory of Adrian von Bubenberg.
