= Rennweg (Zurich) =

Street in Zurich, Switzerland

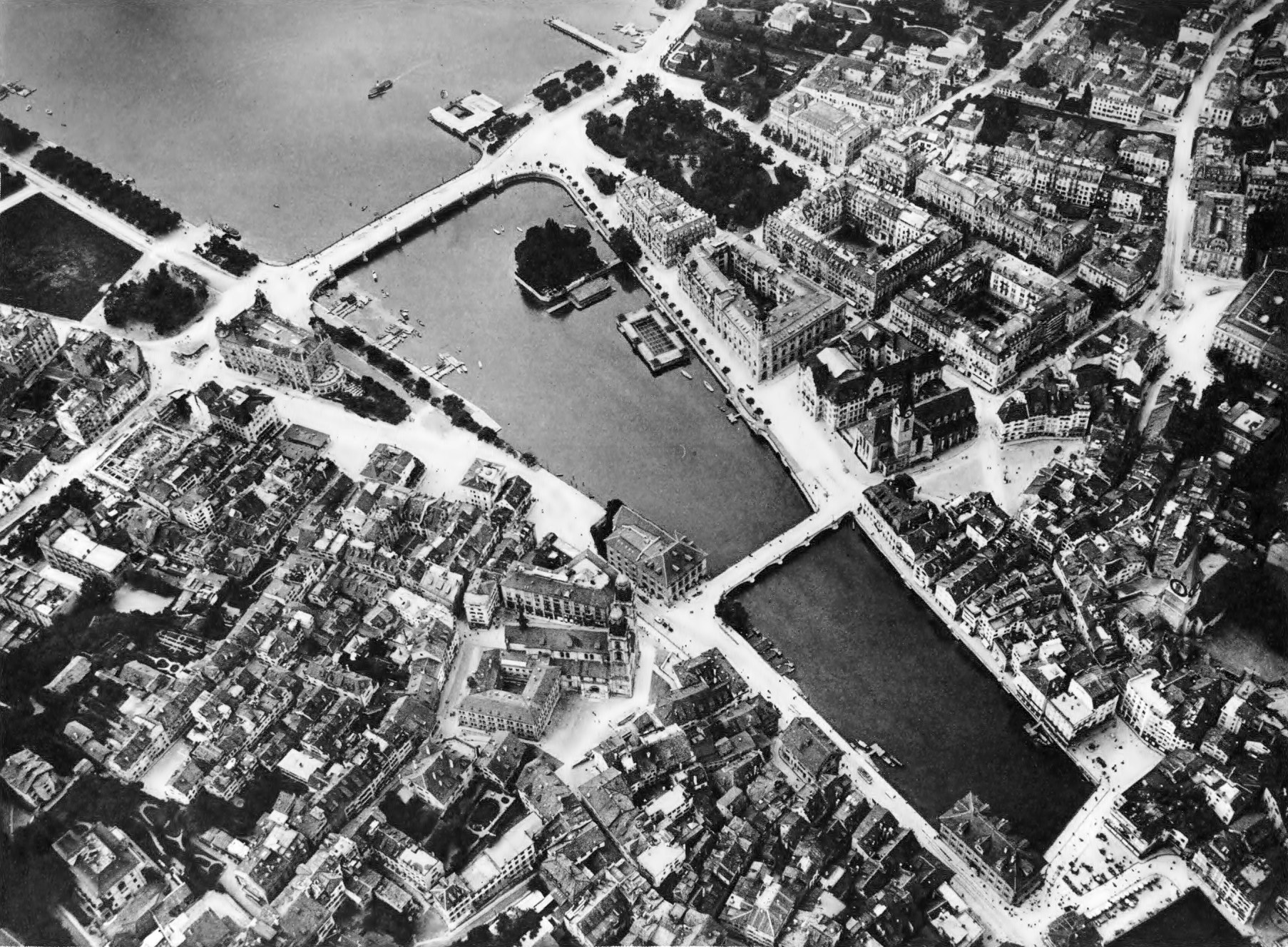
- Limmatquai and Quaianlagen in Zurich: Bellevueplatz and Bürkliplatz, Quaibrücke, Münsterbrücke and Münsterhof, and Rathausbrücke–Weinplatz, aerial photography by Eduard Spelterini in the probably mid-1890s.
- Interactive map of Rennweg
- Type: pedestrian zone
- Owner: City of Zurich
- Length: about 260 metres (280 yd)
- Addresses: Rennweg
- Location: Oetebachgasse–Widdergasse–(Weinplatz); Zurich, Switzerland
- Postal code: 8001
- Coordinates: 47.3740°N 8.5387°E

Construction
- Completion: probably around 1200 AD or before

Rennweg (Swiss Standard German pronunciation: [ˈrɛnveːɡ]) is a medieval main road and is today part of the inner-city pedestrian zone of Zurich, Switzerland. In medieval German, a Rennweg was a street where horses could run. Once, it was one of the nodal points of road and public transportation. Today, together with Limmatquai and Augustinergasse, it forms a section of the southern extension of the Seeuferanlage promenades that were built between 1881 and 1887. Rennweg is one of the best known visitor attractions of the oldest area of the city.

== Geography and history ==
Archaeologists excavated individual and aerial finds of the Celtic-Helvetii oppidum Lindenhof from around the 1st century BC La Tène culture, whose remains were discovered in archaeological campaigns in the years 1989, 1997, 2004 and 2007 on Lindenhof, Münsterhof and Rennweg, and also in the 1900s, but the finds mistakenly were identified as Roman objects. Not yet archaeologically proven, but suggested by the historians, as well for the first construction of the today's Münsterbrücke Limmat crossing, the present Weinplatz square was the former civilian harbour of the Celtic-Roman Turicum, and so the term Weinplatz may have kept its ancient meaning wine square.

In the European Middle Ages, it was the main street of the upper town of Zurich, leading from the Rennwegtor gate in the fortifications of Zurich and passing below the Lindenhof hill towards the town hall. The site of the Rennweg gate is at the current junction of the Rennweg with the Bahnhofstrasse, the Bahnhofstrasse itself following the course of the 13th-century Fröschengraben, the inner moat that was enforced by the later built Schanzengraben.

Accounts of the Battle of St. Jakob an der Sihl in the Old Zurich War, which occurred on July 22, 1443, describe that Zurich Mayor Rudolf Stüssi fell while trying to defend the bridge across the Sihl. The city was then saved by the gatekeeper's wife, one Anna Ziegler, who managed to lower the portcullis of the Rennweg gate just as the pursuing enemy troops were about to enter the city.

== Transportation ==
The Rennweg stop of lines 6, 7, 11 and 13 of the Zurich tram system is around 80 metres (87 yd) to the south, on Bahnhofstrasse.

== Gallery ==
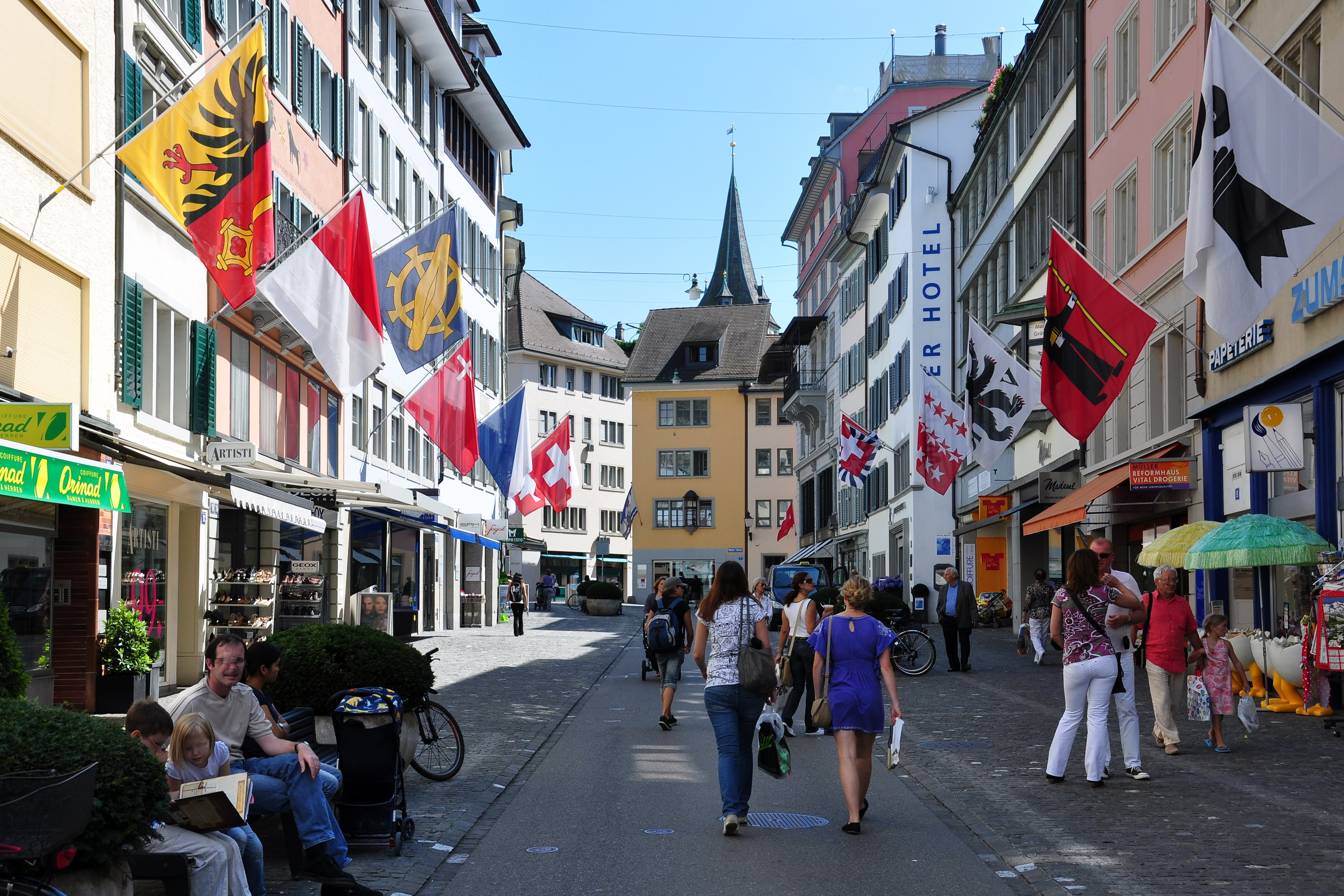
Rennweg towards Glockengasse and Weinplatz

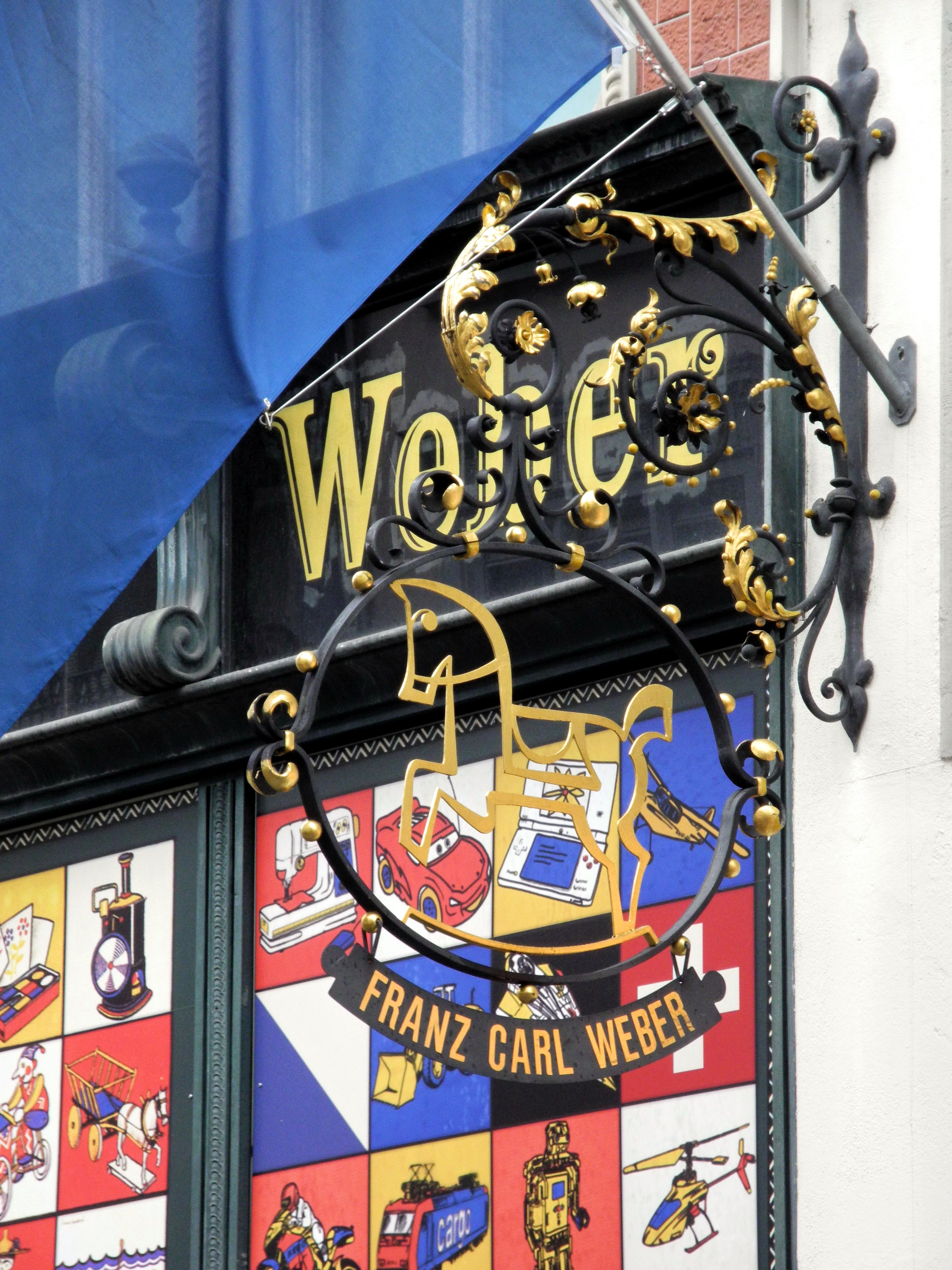
Franz Carl Weber store

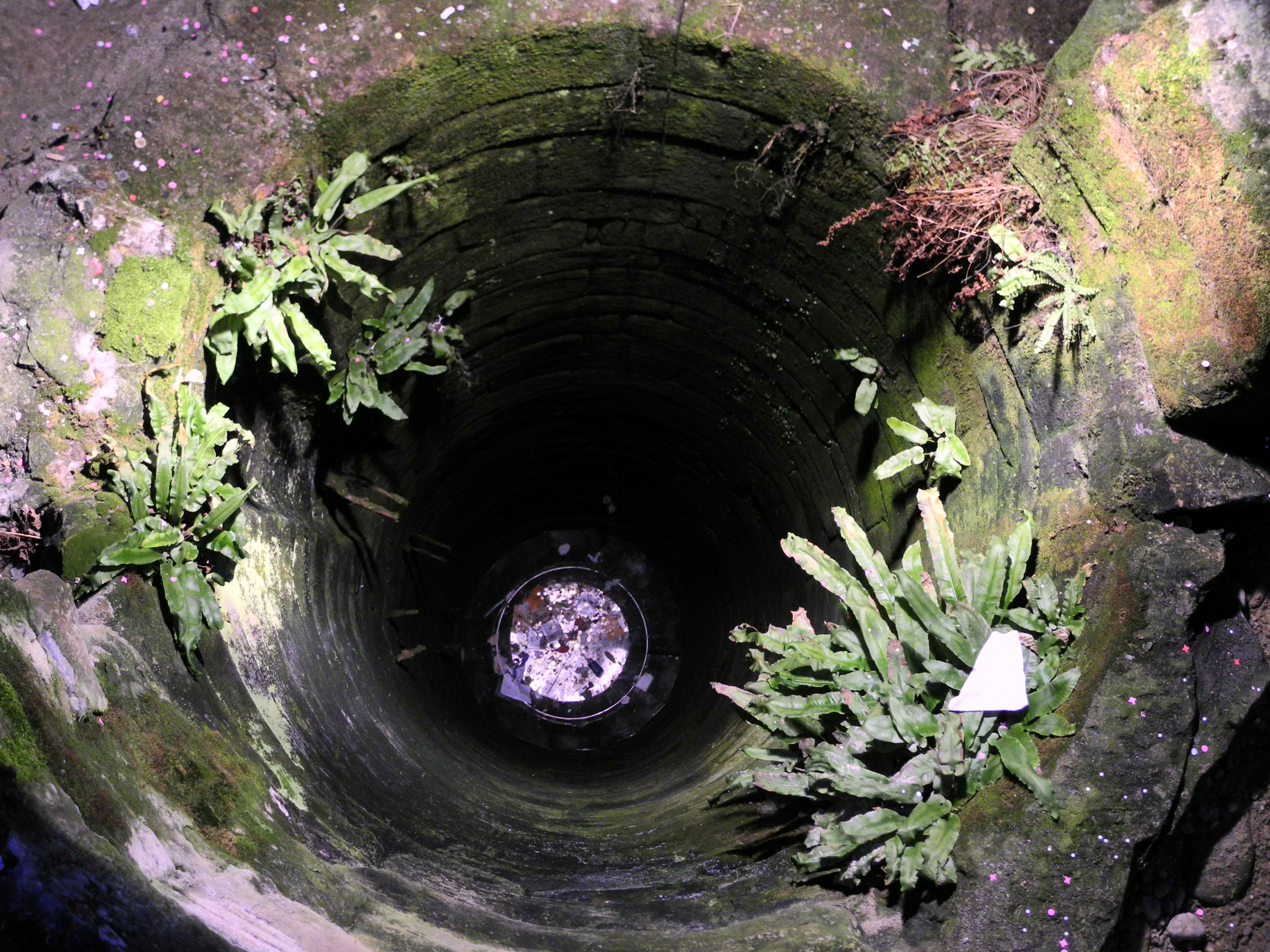
The medieval Rennweg well

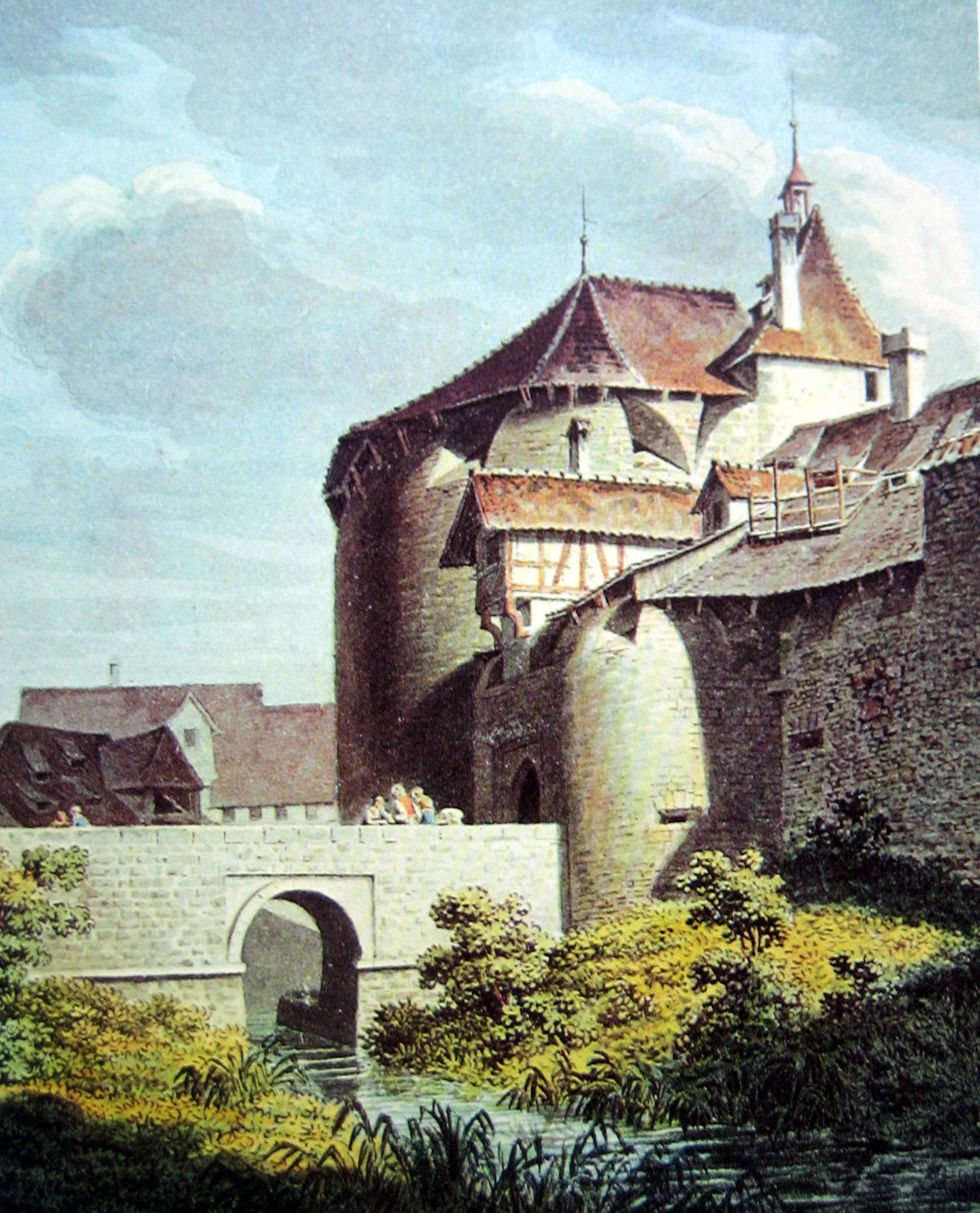
The Rennweg gate in 1812

== See also ==
- Hotel Widder, Rennweg 7
