= Ital Reding the Elder =

Swiss magistrate (d. 1447)

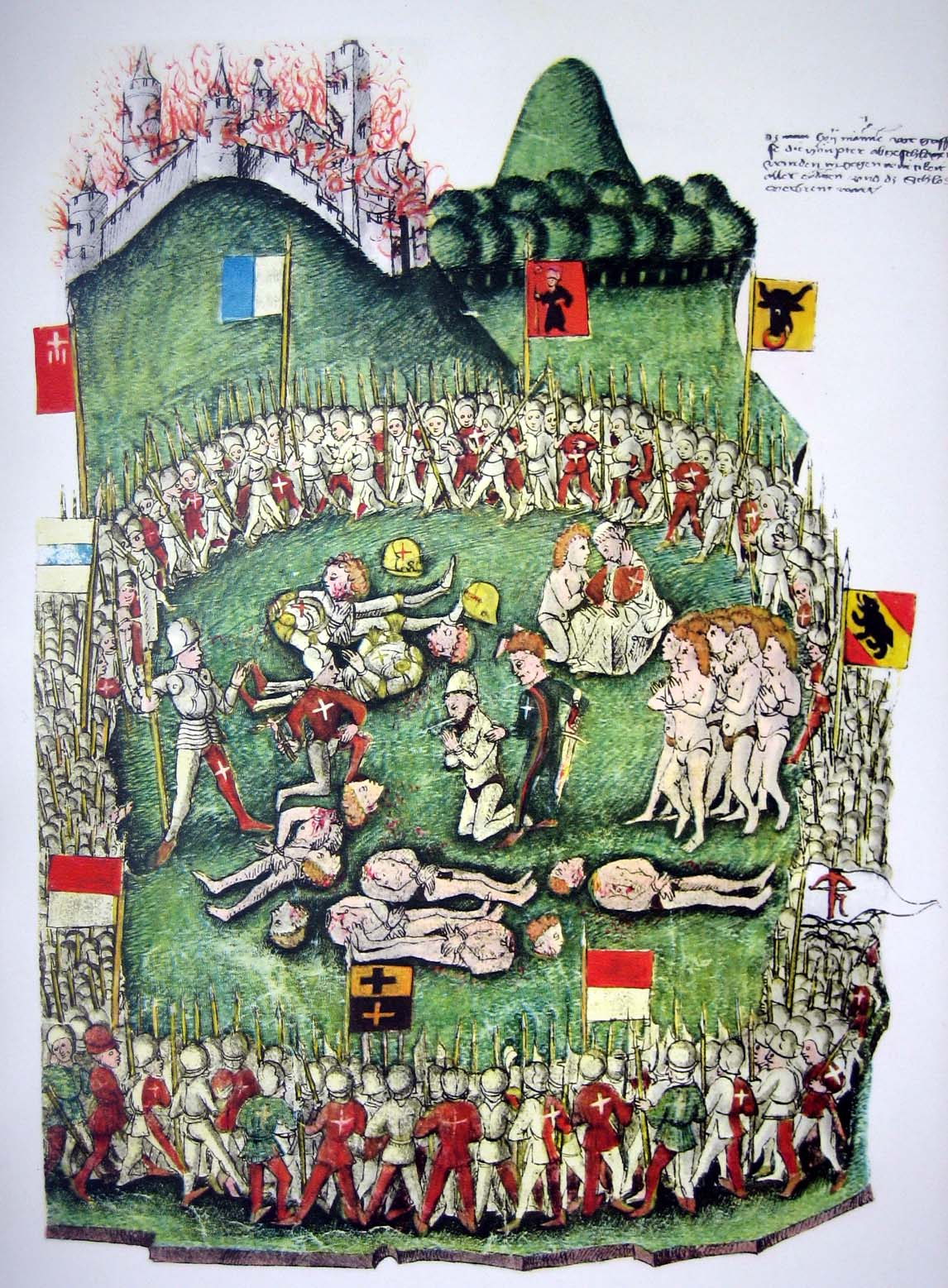
Depiction of the massacre of Greifensee in the Tschachtlanchronik (1470)

Ital Reding the Elder (also Itelhans, c. 1370–1447) was Landammann of Schwyz (during 1411–1428 and 1432–1445) and the leader of the forces of Schwyz during the Old Zürich War (1440–1450).

He is depicted in historiography as the main responsible party for the Murder of Veer, the mass execution of 62 men of the garrison of Greifensee Castle after their surrender, on 28 May 1444.

As Landammann of Schwyz, Reding represented Schwyz in the Tagsatzung (Swiss Diet). He also represented the Swiss Confederacy at the Council of Constance (1415). He succeeded in greatly expanding the territory of Schwyz by consent of king Sigismund, acquiring jurisdiction over Einsiedeln, March, and Küssnacht. In 1424, he even acquired the patronage of Einsiedeln Abbey without the knowledge of the abbot. He was also successful in the dispute with Zürich over the inheritance of the counts of Toggenburg, acquiring the Toggenburg as a co-dominium of Schwyz and Glarus in 1436. Zürich reacted with a trade embargo, forcing Schwyz to import wheat from Aargau and the Alsace.

Tensions escalated into the Old Zürich War in 1439/40. Ital Reding as the leader of the Schwyz force harried the canton of Zürich in 1440, forcing Zürich to revoke the embargo.

Zürich then made a defensive pact with the House of Habsburg, effectively reneging their membership in the Swiss Confederacy. The Swiss again invaded the territories of Zürich, capturing Grüningen in 1443 and advancing to Greifensee in the spring of 1444.

They besieged Greifensee castle from 1 May 1444. The garrison surrendered on 28 May under the condition of safe conduct on 27 May. On the following day, 62 men of the garrison, all except for one Ueli Kupferschmid who was spared for being a native of Schwyz, were executed by the Swiss. This massacre, dubbed the "Murder of Greifensee" (Mord von Greifensee) was perceived as an unprecedented crime in the military history of the Confederacy. Ital Reding as the ranking commander is seen as the responsible party for the massacre.

He retired from all offices in the following year, but there is no positive record of a direct connection of the massacre with his resignation.

In contemporary sources, Schwyz chronologist Hans Fründ only gives a very brief mention to the massacre and does not mention Reding's name in connection with it. By contrast, Zürich chronist Gerold Edlibach is unambiguous in blaming Reding for commanding the massacre. Werner Schodoler and Diebold Schilling the Younger also mention Reding's responsibility for the massacre. Schilling even claims that Reding insisted that he would personally kill the men if the executioner would refuse to do his duty. In modern historiography, Theodor von Liebenau (1870) based on letters written by eye witnesses concluded that the decision to execute the garrison had been taken by consensus of the commanders of all cantons present (Schwyz, Uri, Unterwalden, Glarus, Bern, Lucerne, Zug).

Reding died in 1447, and was succeeded by his son, Ital Reding the Younger, as Amman of Schwyz. Reding appears as a character in fictionalized depictions of the Murder of Greifensee, including Heinrich Zschokke's Der Freihof von Aarau (1823), Gottfried Keller's Der Landvogt von Greifensee (1878) and Albrecht Emch's Ital Reding, der Eisenkopf von Greifensee oder Die Mordtat von Greifensee (1867).
