= Itel Reding =

Ital Reding may refer to:

== People ==
- Ital Reding the Elder (~c. 1370 – 1447), Schwyz Landammann and military leader
- Ital Reding the Younger (1410–1466), Schwyz Landammann
- Ital Reding (Landvogt) (1573–1651), Landvogt and knight banneret

== Other uses ==
- Ital-Reding-Haus or Ital-Reding-Hofstatt, a residence in Schwyz
- Itel Reding, a character from the play Wilhelm Tell
- Itel Reding, the Unter of Bells in a double German pack of cards
