= Hotel Widder =

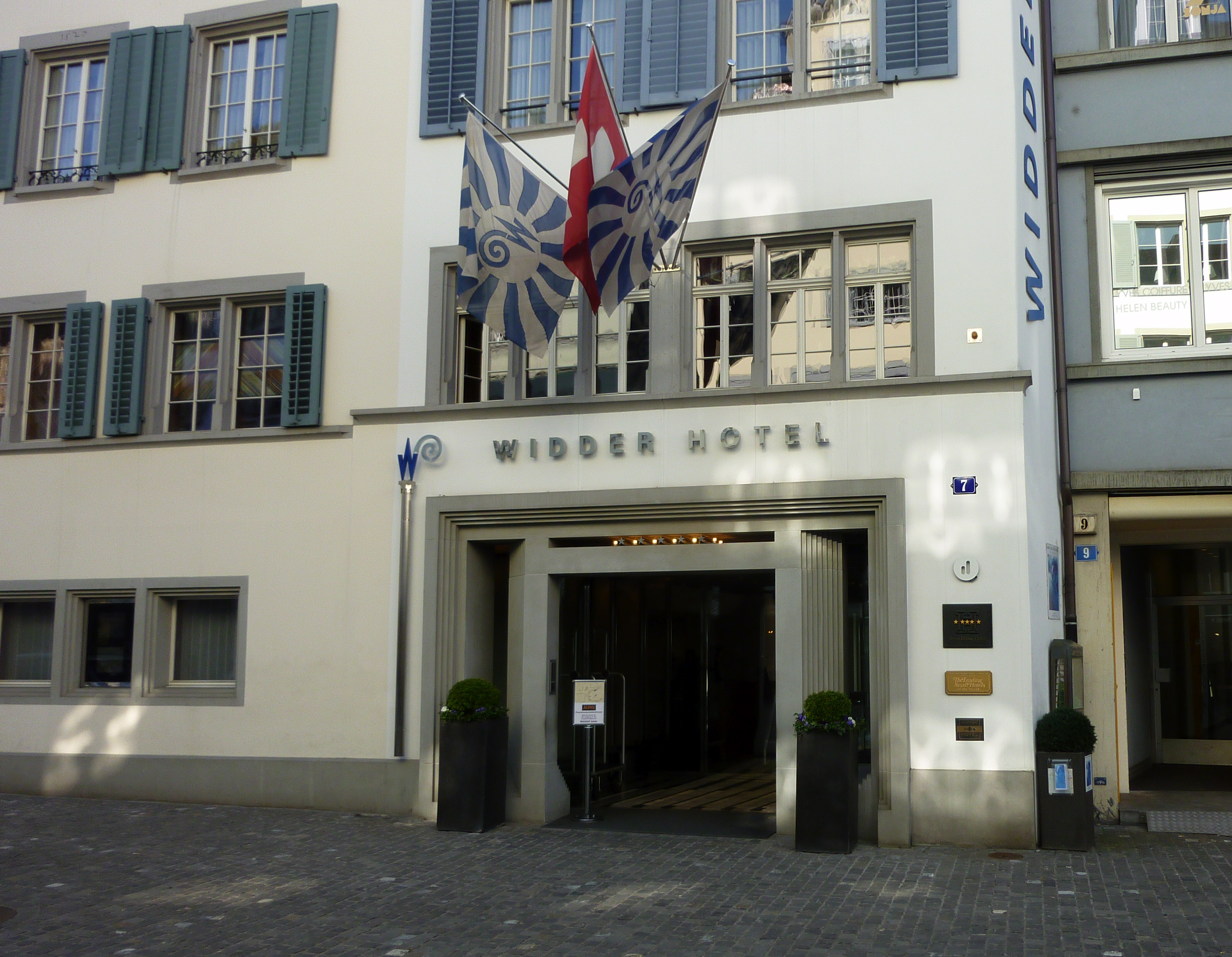
- Pictured in 2010
- Interactive map of the Hotel Widder area

General information
- Type: Hotel
- Location: Rennweg 7 Zurich, Switzerland
- Coordinates: 47°22′21″N 8°32′23″E
- Opened: 1995 (31 years ago)
- Owner: The Living Circle

Other information
- Number of rooms: 49

Website
- www.widderhotel.com/en/

The Hotel Widder is a hotel and restaurant in Zurich, Switzerland. Established in 1995, it is located on Rennweg, in Niederdorf, in the city's Altstadt district. The hotel's 49 rooms are spread across nine medieval townhouses, the oldest of which dates to the 13th century. Widder is German for ram, with the name being chosen for the hotel because one of the townhouses was the guildhouse for a master butcher.

In 2003, when the hotel had its original eight townhouses and 42 rooms, it was owned by Swiss bank UBS. UBS sold the property to insurance company Swiss Life in 2018, while the hotel business is part of The Living Circle group, which is based in Zurich's Bleicherweg.

The hotel underwent a large renovation in 2009 and in 2016, the latter to a design by architect Tilla Theus.

Its two restaurants are named Boucherie AuGust and the Widder Restaurant.

== See also ==
- List of hotels in Switzerland
- List of restaurants in Switzerland
- Tourism in Switzerland
