= Battle of St. Jakob an der Sihl =

1443 battle of the Old Zürich War

- Part of Old Zürich War
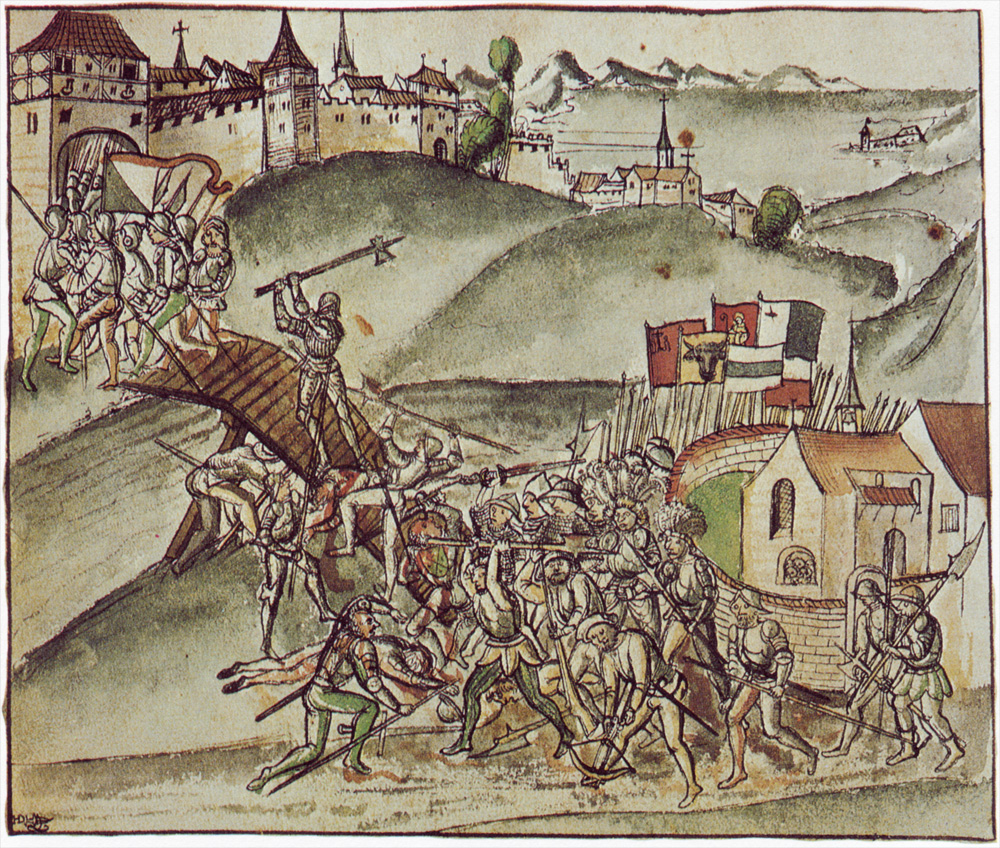
- The mayor of Zürich, Rudolf Stüssi, defends the bridge of St. Jakob, near Zürich, against the forces of the Old Swiss Confederacy during the Battle of St. Jakob an der Sihl. Depicted are the Rennweg gate in the background and the St. Jakob chapel in the fore. (Werner Schodoler, 1515)
Date	22 July 1443
Location	Zurich 47°22′25″N 8°31′51″E
Result	Victory for the Old Swiss Confederacy

Belligerents
Zurich; Holy Roman Empire	Old Swiss Confederacy

Commanders and leaders
Rudolf Stüssi; Albrecht Freiherr von Bussnang	Unknown

Strength
Unknown Zurich +500 HRE knights	6,000

Casualties and losses
300	Unknown

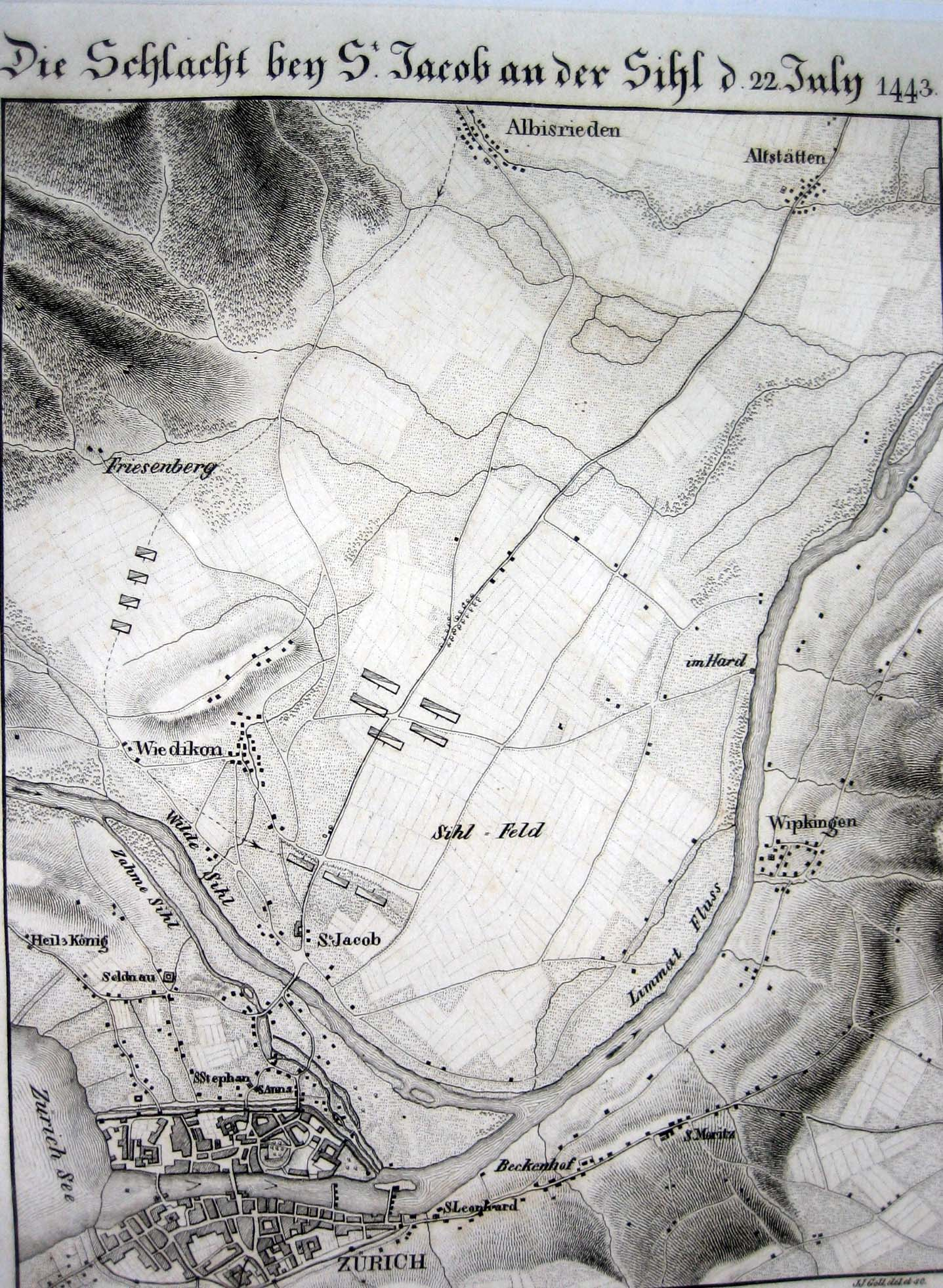
18th century etching of the battle's situation

The Battle of St. Jakob an der Sihl was a battle of the Old Zürich War that occurred on 22 July 1443, resulting in a defeat for Zürich.

The battle took place outside the gates of Zürich, beyond the Sihl (today's Aussersihl district). The troops of Zürich, with Habsburg reinforcements, met the attacking confederates on the Sihlfeld north of St. Jakob on 21 July. The confederation army, which numbered about 6,000 men, was met by Zürich's disorganized troops and about 500 Austrian knights. The following morning the confederation army attacked the front and then the left flank of the army. Zürich's forces were pushed back and had to escape across the Sihl into the city. The confederates did not have the means to lay siege to the city and withdrew. The defeat of Zürich was thus not decisive, and the war continued until 1446.

The commander of the Habsburg forces, Albrecht Freiherr von Bussnang, was killed behind the altar of the St. Jakob chapel. According to Zürich chroniclers, Zürich's bürgermeister Rudolf Stüssi fell at this battle amongst the defenders of the bridge across the Sihl. Stüssi was covering his troops' retreat when he was killed by a confederate hiding below the bridge.

This account, which emphasizes the bürgermeister's bravery, is considered Zürich propaganda by historians.

Another version of the story has Stüssi stopping in the middle of the bridge, brandishing his broad battle-axe and shouting, "Halt, citizens, halt!" To this a man of Zurich cried, "May God's lightning blast thee! All this evil comes from thee alone," and ran him through with his lance.

Additional accounts from Zürich chronicles state that the city was saved by the gatekeeper's wife, one Anna Ziegler, who managed to lower the portcullis of the Rennweg gate just as the pursuing confederates were about to enter the city.

== See also ==
- Battles of the Old Swiss Confederacy
