= Johannes Fründ =

Swiss writer (1400–1500)

Johannes Fründ (Hans Fründ, c. 1400–1468) was a Swiss clerk and chronicler.

Born and educated in Lucerne, he was employed as a scribe in that city in 1429, working under Egloff Etterlin. Around the year 1430, he wrote about the ongoing witch-trials in Valais.

From 1437 to 1453, he was state secretary (Landschreiber) of Schwyz. In this function, he participated in several Swiss Diets and also served as scribe on campaign during the Old Zürich War (1440–46). His chronicle on the Zürich War is essentially a contemporary eyewitness account. Fründ appears to have contracted a serious illness in 1447 which prevented him from completing the chronicle, so the text does not cover the peace negotiations and final treaty of 1450.

Fründ remained in Schwyz until 1457. In that year, he was again employed by Lucerne in the office of court secretary (Gerichtsschreiber) after an unsuccessful application for the position of state secretary (Stadtschreiber).

Fründ was married three times, to Elli Bumbel, then Adelheid von Tengen, and finally to Margaretha Giessmann. He died probably in 1468, and certainly before 10 March 1469. He appears to have had acquired some wealth, as there are records of a dispute over his inheritance between his third wife and his daughter from his second marriage.

Fründ's chronicle is one of the main sources (alongside Conrad Justingers Bernese Chronicle of c. 1430) used in the Tschachtlanchronik of 1470. Similarly, Diebold Schilling the Elder used substantial portions of Fründ's text in his 1483 chronicle. Although Fründ's text was widely received by way of the works of these later writers, his own authorship was mostly forgotten, and his own works misattributed. Fründ's chronicle was considered lost, and Heinrich Bullinger misattributed his text to one Ulrich Wagner. He was only remembered as a chronicler by Aegidius Tschudi (c. 1550), who is otherwise not known as a very reliable witness. Fründ's identity and authorship was eventually recovered in Swiss historiography in the 1870s, first by Hungerbühler (1871), who however misattributed an early text on the Swiss Swedish origin legend to Fründ, the text of his chronicle being edited by Kind (1875).
