= Old Zurich War =

War of succession within the Old Swiss Confederacy from 1440 to 1446

Old Zurich War / Alter Zürichkrieg
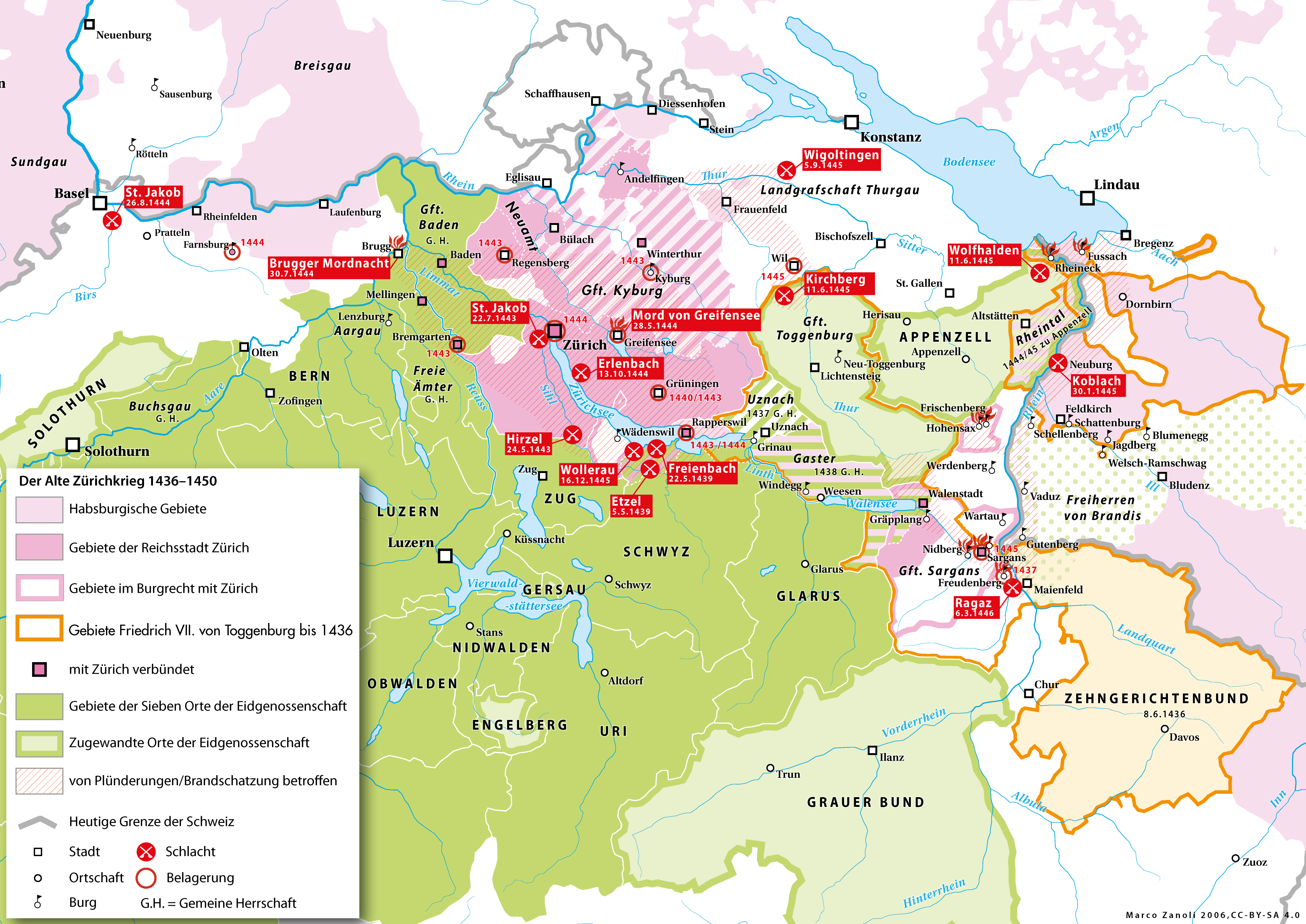
- Eastern Switzerland in the mid-15th century: Territories of the Imperial City of Zürich (hatching shows Kyburg) Territories of the Sieben Orte of the Swiss Confederacy Associates of the Swiss Confederacy Lands of Frederick VII, Count of Toggenburg, as of 1436 Modern Swiss border
| Date | 2 November 1440 – 12 June 1446 |
| Location | Swiss Plateau |
| Result | Settled by the Peace of Einsiedeln, 13 July 1450, Zurich re-admitted to the Confederation |
| Territorial changes | Southern Zurich littoral (March and Höfe) lost to Schwyz; Kyburg lost to the Habsburgs (until 1452) |

Belligerents
| (Canton of Zurich) Imperial City of Zurich; Habsburg Further Austria; France | Old Swiss Confederacy: Bern; Lucerne; Uri; Schwyz; Unterwalden; Glarus; Zug; (Appenzell Innerrhoden) Vogteien of Appenzell |

Commanders and leaders
| Frederick III of Germany; Charles VII of France | Unknown |

The Old Zurich War (German: Alter Zürichkrieg; 1440–1446) was a conflict between the canton of Zurich and the other seven cantons of the Old Swiss Confederacy over the succession to the Count of Toggenburg.

In 1436, Count Friedrich VII of Toggenburg died, leaving neither heir nor will. The canton of Zurich, led by burgomaster Rudolf Stüssi, claimed the Toggenburg lands; the cantons of Schwyz and Glarus made counter-claims, backed by the other cantons. In 1438, Zurich occupied the disputed area and cut off grain supplies to Schwyz and Glarus. In 1440, the other cantons expelled Zurich from the confederation and declared war. Zurich retaliated by making an alliance with Frederick III, Holy Roman Emperor of the house of Habsburg.

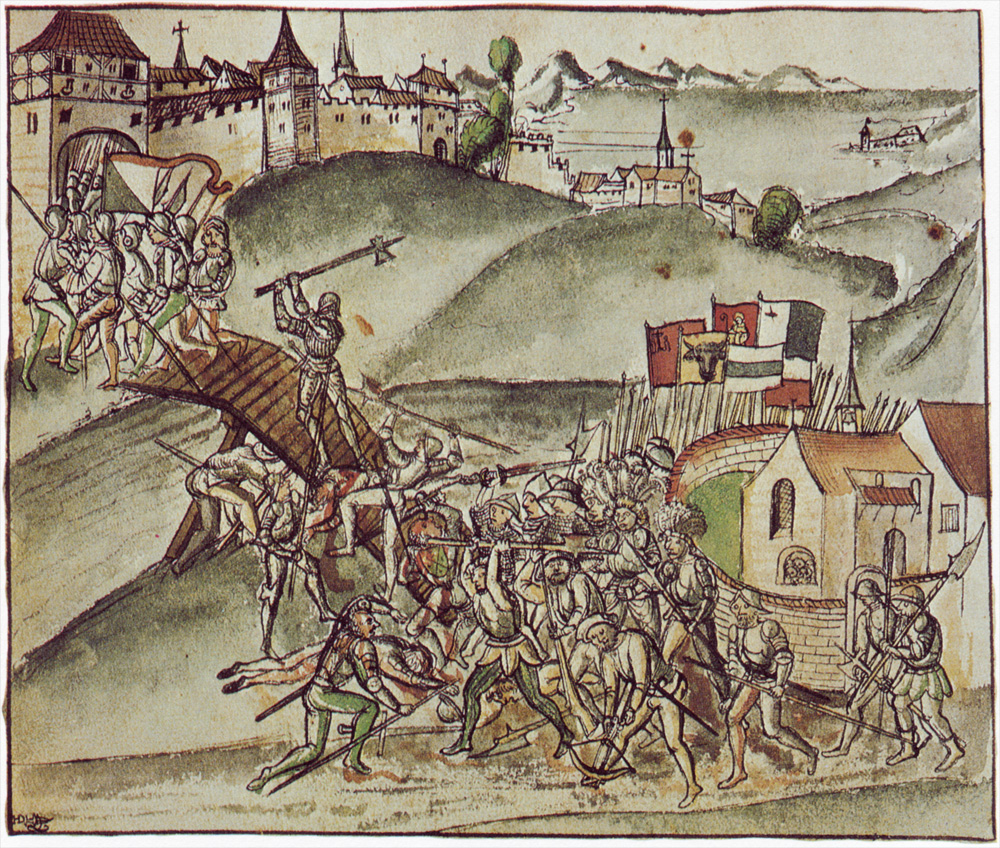
The mayor of Zurich, Rudolf Stüssi, defends the bridge of St. Jakob, near Zurich, against the forces of the Old Swiss Confederacy during the Battle of St. Jakob an der Sihl (1443). Illustration from the chronicle of Wernher Schodeler, c. 1515

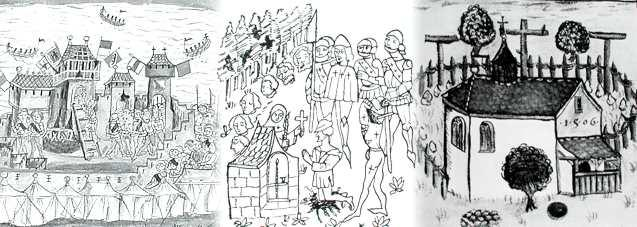
Siege and beheading of the Zurich/Habsburg defenders of Greifensee (1444), memorial chapel to the right

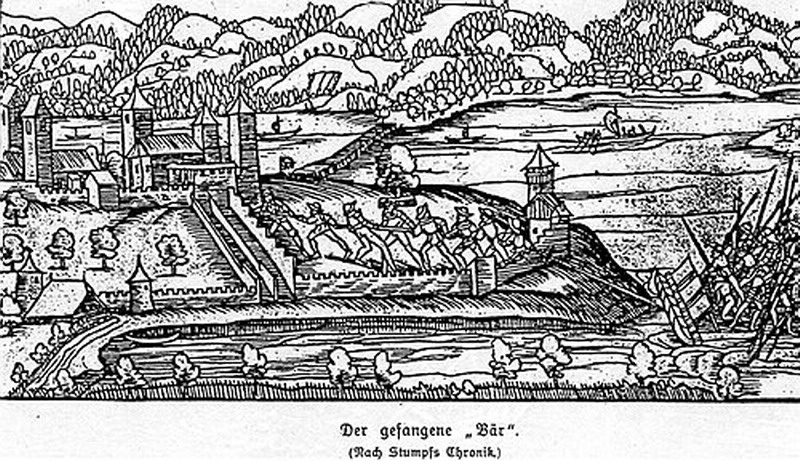
Rapperswil/Habsburg soldiers marquing a battle barque manned by probably soldiers from Schwyz on Lake Zurich at Endigerhorn in Rapperswil, Rapperswil Castle atop the Lindenhof hill to the left (~1445)

The forces of Zurich were defeated in the Battle of St. Jakob an der Sihl on 22 July 1443 and Zurich was besieged. Frederick appealed to Charles VII of France to attack the confederates and the latter sent a force of about 30,000 Armagnac mercenaries under the command of the Dauphin via Basel to relieve the city. In the Battle of St. Jakob an der Birs near Basel on 26 August 1444, a blocking force of roughly 1,600 Swiss confederates was defeated, but inflicted such heavy losses on the French (2,000 killed) that the Dauphin decided to retreat. The confederacy and the Dauphin concluded a peace in October 1444, and his mercenary army withdrew from the war altogether.

In May 1444, the confederacy laid siege to Greifensee, and captured the town after four weeks, on May 27, beheading all but two of the 64 defenders the next day, including their leader, Wildhans von Breitenlandenberg, the so-called Murder of Greifensee. Even in this time of war, such a mass execution was widely considered a cruel and unjust deed.

By 1446, both sides were exhausted, and a preliminary peace was concluded. The confederation had not managed to conquer any of the cities of Zurich except Greifensee; Rapperswil and Zurich itself withstood the attacks. In 1450, the parties made a definitive peace and Zurich was admitted into the confederation again, but had to dissolve its alliance with the Habsburgs.

The significance of the war is that it showed that the confederation had grown into a political alliance so close that it no longer tolerated separatist tendencies of a single member.

== See also ==
- Battles of the Old Swiss Confederacy
- Johannes Fründ
