= Rudolf Stüssi =

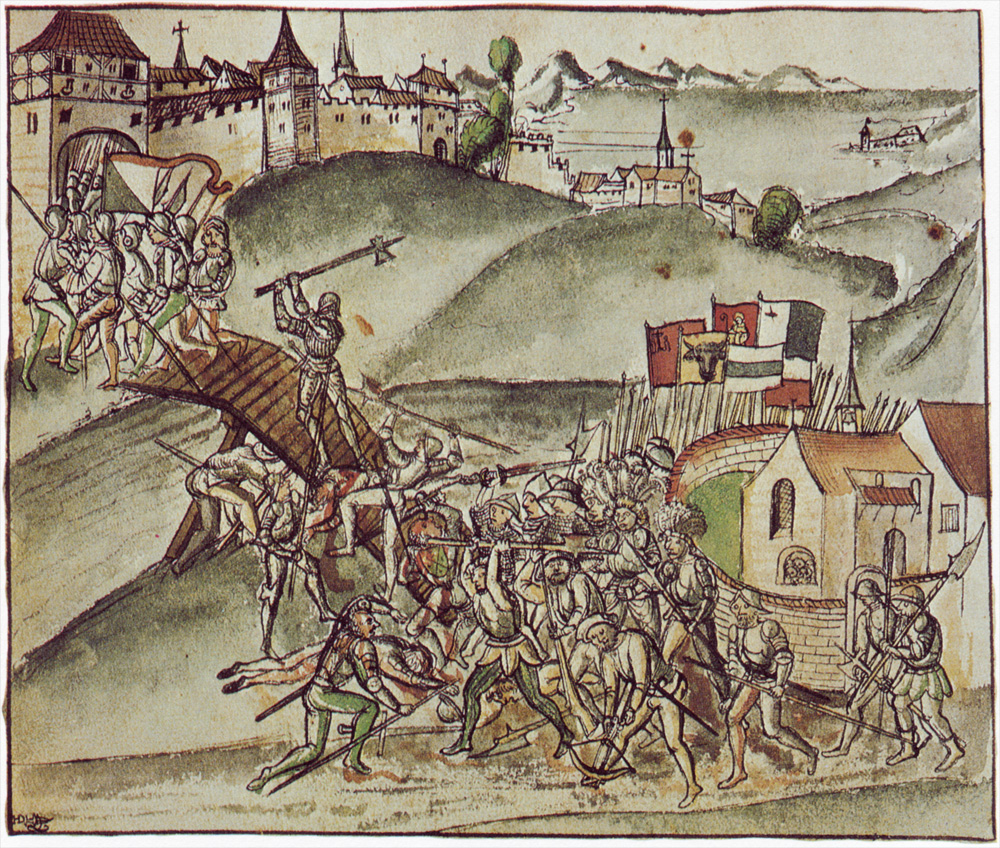
Rudolf Stüssi defends the bridge of St. Jakob, near Zurich, against the forces of the Old Swiss Confederacy during the Battle of St. Jakob an der Sihl (1443)

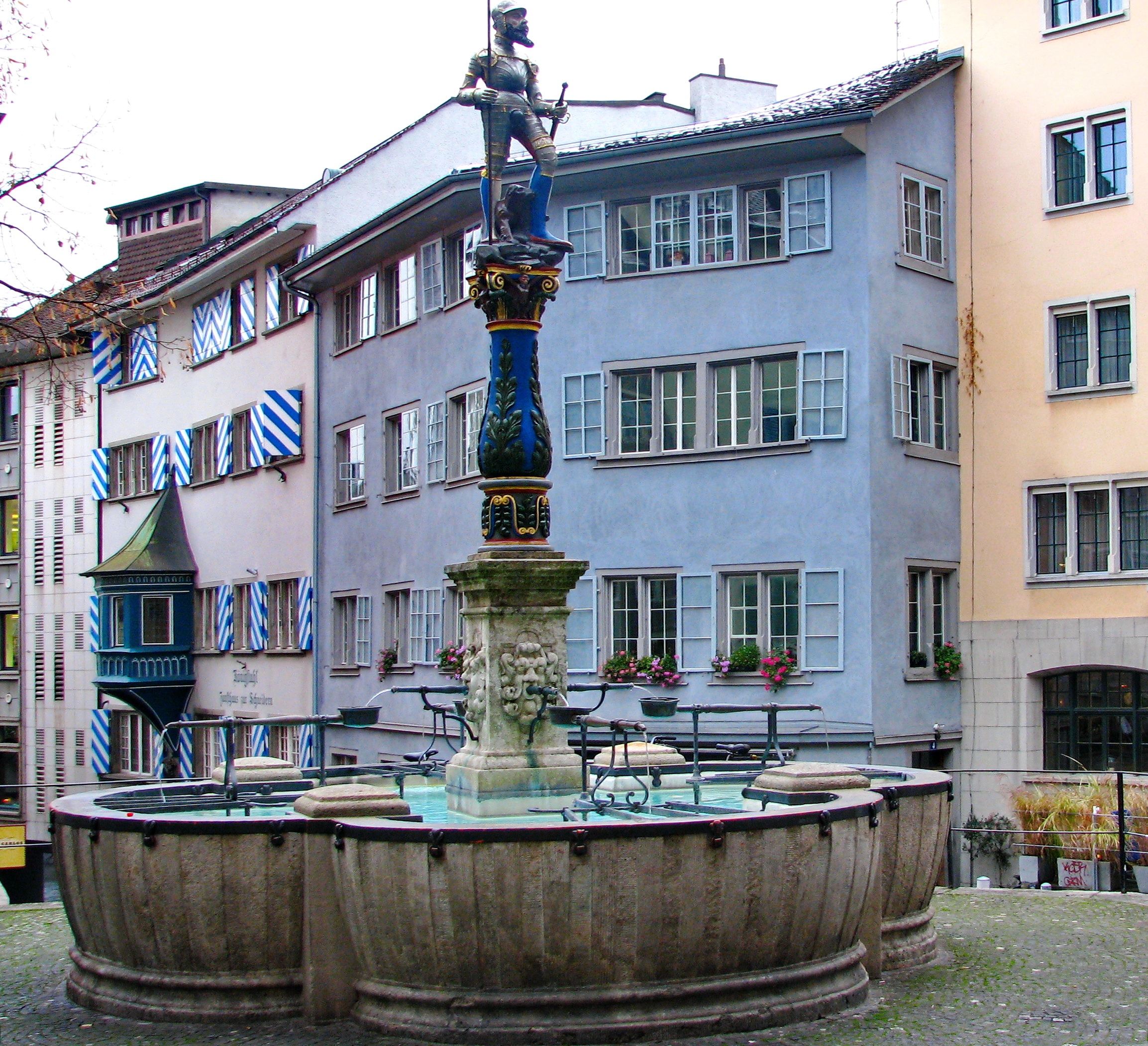
Niederdorf: Stüssihofstatt with Rudolf Stüssi memorial and Guild house zur Schneidern (tailors) at the left side, the former home Haus Königstuhl of Rudolf Stüssi

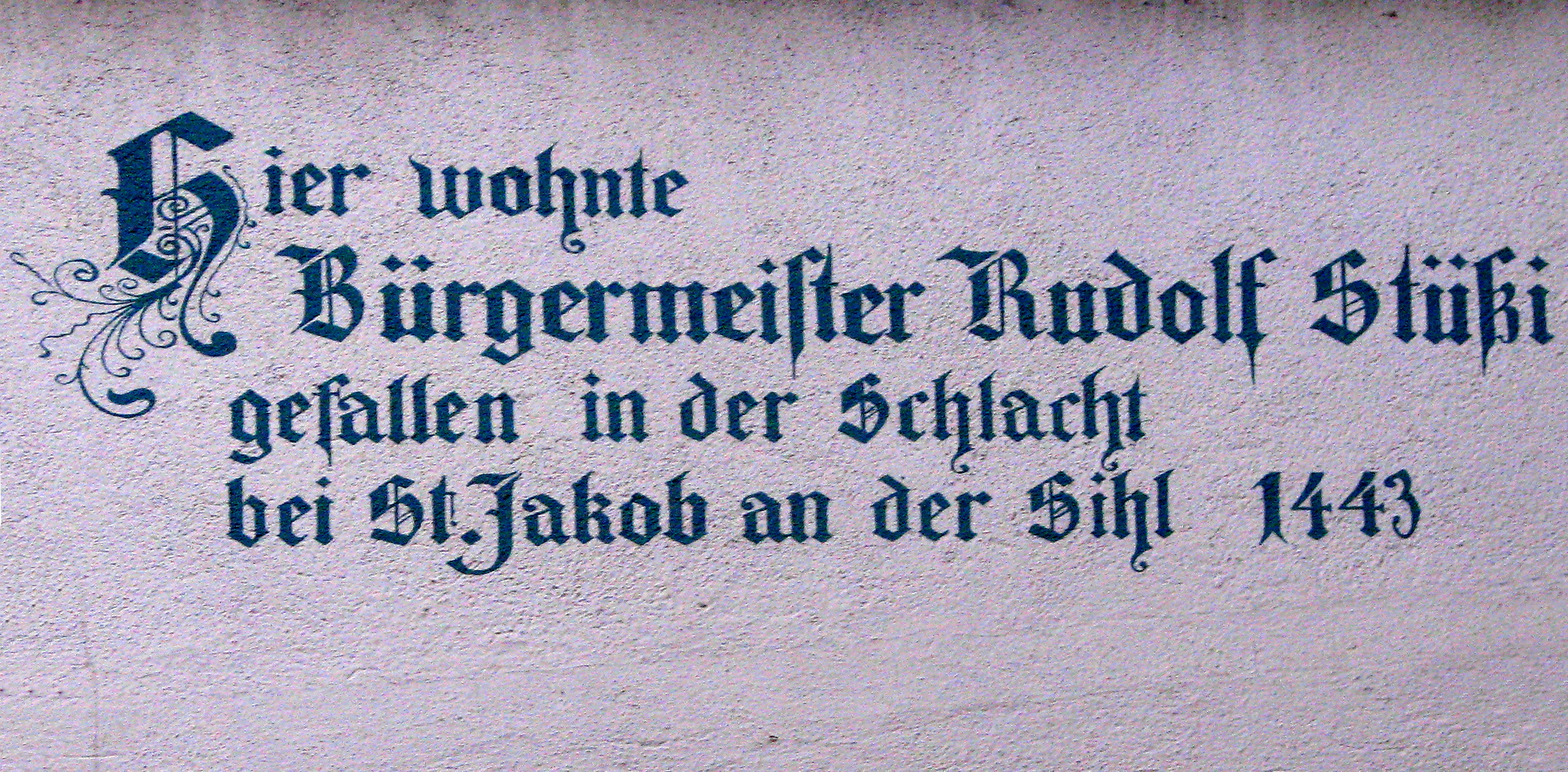
Memorial plate

Rudolf Stüssi (died 22 July 1443) served as burgomaster of Zürich during the mid-fifteenth century. His expansionist ambitions for Zurich caused the Old Zürich War (1440–46).

== Biography ==
Stüssi's father came from Glarus and became a citizen of Zürich in 1375. Stüssi's father was elected to offices in Zürich starting in 1388.

Rudolf was elected to city offices from 1414. In 1424, he served as Zürich's envoy in the Old Swiss Confederacy. He served as mayor of Zürich from 1430 until his death.

In 1433, he traveled to Rome as a representative of Zürich to attend the coronation of Sigismund of Luxembourg. There he was knighted.

He lived in a house later called the Stüssihofstatt, situated some 100 m (330 ft) northeast of the Rathaus (47.3724°N 8.5436°E).

== Career ==
During his term of office, Stüssi attempted to extend the rule and influence of his city. In 1436, Count Friedrich VII of Toggenburg died, leaving neither heir nor will. The canton of Zürich, led by Stüssi, claimed the Toggenburg lands; the cantons of Schwyz and Glarus made counter-claims, backed by the other cantons. Stüssi allied himself in 1442 with Frederick III, Holy Roman Emperor against the Old Swiss Confederacy.

He died at the Battle of St. Jakob an der Sihl, defending the bridge over the Sihl while covering the retreat of the army of Zürich. According to chroniclers, he was killed by a confederate hiding below the bridge. Another version of the story has Stüssi stopping in the middle of the bridge, brandishing his broad battle-axe and shouting, "Halt, citizens, halt!" To this a man of Zurich cried, "May God's lightning blast thee! All this evil comes from thee alone," and ran him through with his lance.
