= Wernher Schodeler =

Swiss chronicler

Werner Schodoler (also Wernher Schodoler (1490 in Bremgarten, Aargau – 15 October 1541, in Bremgarten, Aargau) was a Swiss chronicler. He was the author of Swiss History, the earliest of the Swiss illustrated chronicles.

== Literature ==
- Walter Muschg and Eduard A. Gessler Die Schweizer Bilderchroniken des 15/16 Jahrhunderts Zurich, Atlantis Verlag, 1941.
