= Fichtel Mountains =

Mountain range in Germany and the Czech Republic

- Fichtelgebirge / Smrčiny
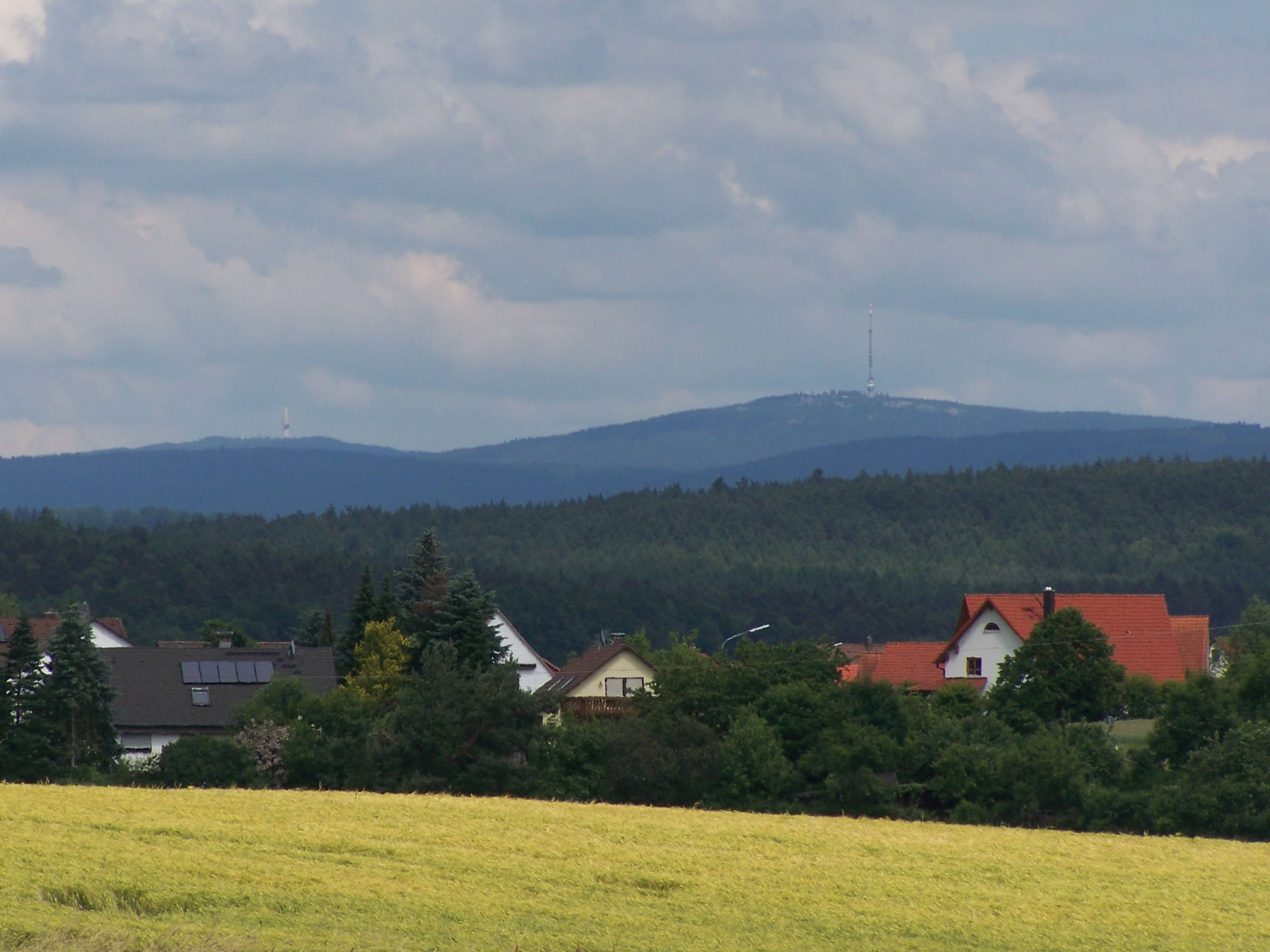
- The Schneeberg (left) and the Ochsenkopf (right), seen from Heinersreuth

Highest point
- Peak: Schneeberg
- Elevation: 1,051 m (3,448 ft)

Geography
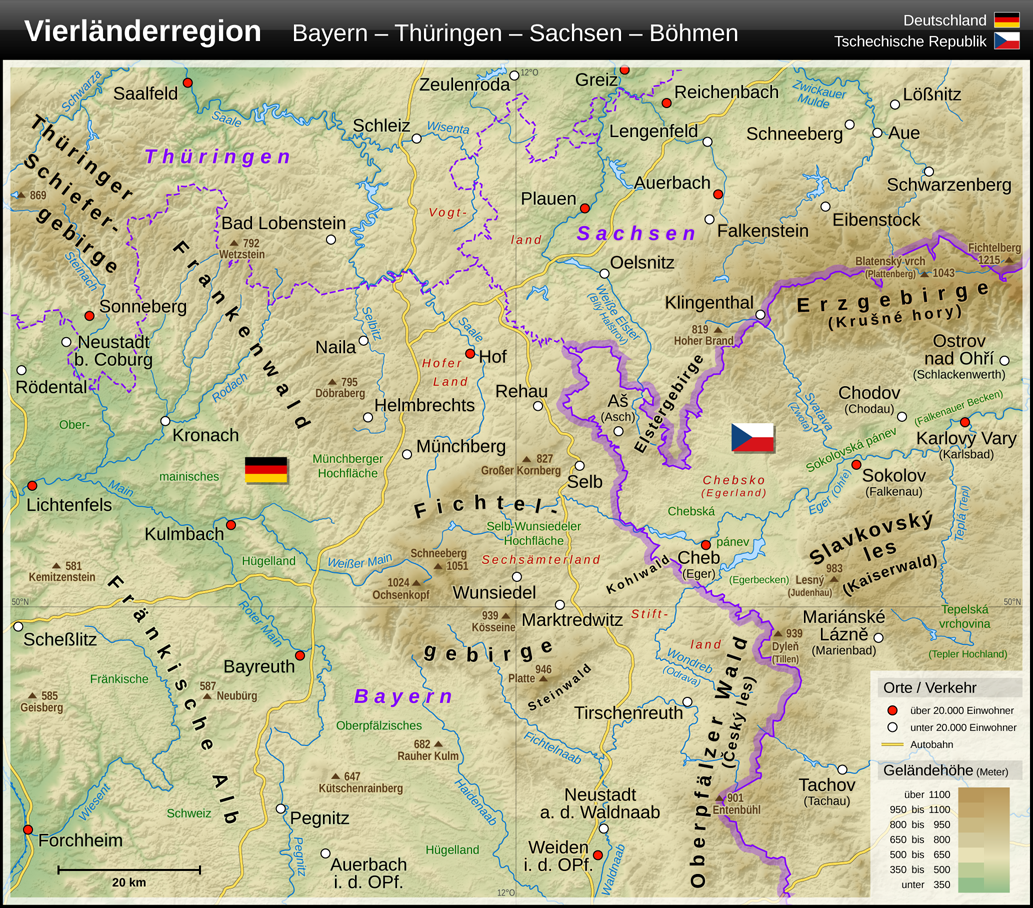
- The Fichtel Mountains in northeast Bavaria
- Countries: Germany, Czech Republic
- Range coordinates: 50°03′N 11°51′E
- Parent range: Thuringian-Franconian Highlands

The Fichtel Mountains (German: Fichtelgebirge, pronounced [ˈfɪçtl̩ɡəˌbɪʁɡə]; Czech: Smrčiny) are a mountain range in Germany and the Czech Republic. They extend from the valley of the Red Main River in northeastern Bavaria to the Karlovy Vary Region in western Czech Republic. The Fichtel Mountains contain an important nature park, the Fichtel Mountain Nature Park. The Elster Mountains are a part of the Fichtel Mountains.

== Etymology ==
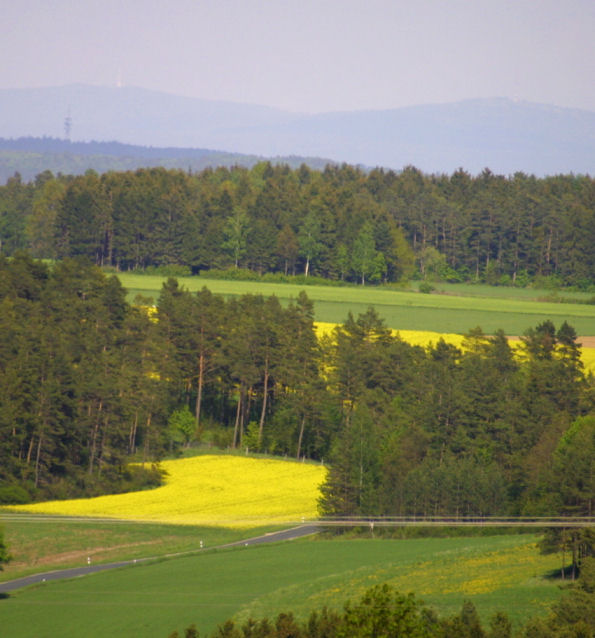
Characteristic landscape in the Fichtel Mountains

The first person to write about the Fichtel Mountains, Matthias of Kemnath (actually Matthias Widmann, born 23 February 1429 in Kemnath) reported in 1476: Ein bergk, hoch, weitt, wolbekant ligt in Beiern, gnant der Fichtelberg ("A mountain, high, wide and well-known, lies in Bavaria, known as the Fichtelberg"). In descriptions of the border in 1499 and 1536, the mountain that is now called the Ochsenkopf was called Vichtelberg; thereafter the name was extended to the whole mountain region. It is also mentioned in old documents: around 1317 the lords of Hirschberg were enfeoffed inter alia with the walt zu dem Vythenberge. By the 14th century iron ore was being extracted in the St. Veith Pit on the southern foot of the mountain. Vyth → Veit → Fichtel. High-profile local-history and name researchers have still not had the last word.

A folk etymology connecting the name Fichtelgebirge with the German word Fichte (meaning "spruce tree") fails to account for the typically non-spruce forests which predominated in the area at the time when the name Fichtelgebirge became established.

== Geography ==
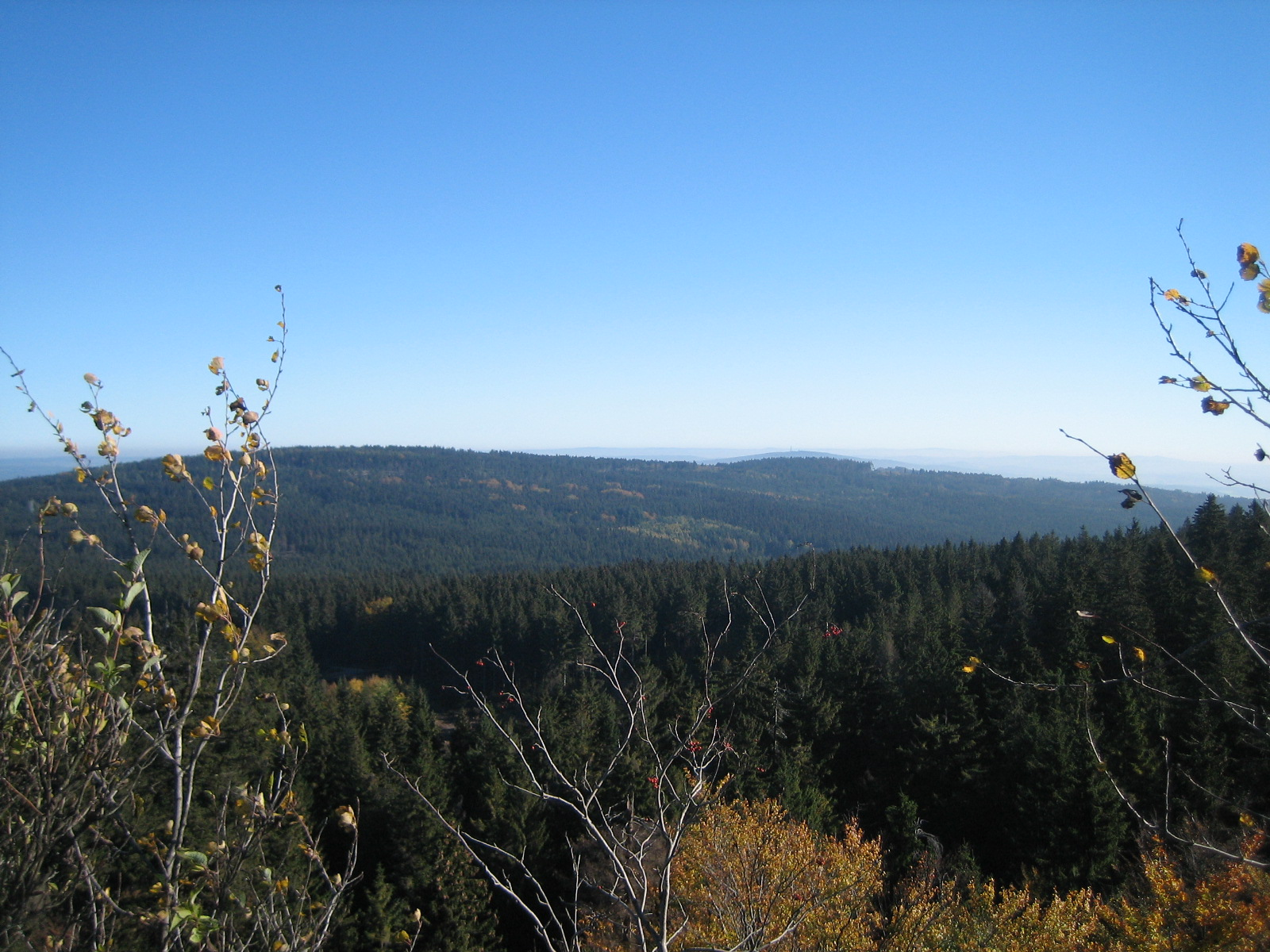
View of the Fichtel Mountains from Waldstein

The Fichtel Mountains have an area of about 1,600 square kilometres (620 sq mi). The Czech part has an area of 289 km^{2} (112 sq mi). The Fichtel Mountain Nature Park in Germany has an area of 1,020 km^{2} (390 sq mi).

The Fichtel Mountains lie between the towns of Hof and Weiden. In the west there is a good transport link to the nearby city of Bayreuth.

The county town in the heart of the Fichtel Mountains is Wunsiedel with its Luisenburg Rock Labyrinth. Other main settlements are Marktredwitz, Marktleuthen, Arzberg, Röslau, Bad Weißenstadt, Waldershof, Kirchenlamitz and Tröstau (all on the upper reaches of the Ohře and the Röslau rivers). The largest settlement in the Czech part of the Fichtel Mountains is Aš.

Further to the southeast and south are Bischofsgrün, Fichtelberg, Mehlmeisel, Nagel, Neusorg, Speichersdorf, Kemnath, Erbendorf, Wiesau and Fuchsmühl, in the west are Weidenberg, Creußen, Bayreuth, Goldkronach, Bindlach and Bad Berneck, in the northwest are Gefrees, Zell im Fichtelgebirge, Weißdorf, Münchberg (Obere Saale), and in the north Selb, Rehau and Hof.

The boundary between the (East) Franconian dialect in the north and west and the (North) Bavarian and Upper Palatine dialects in the east and south runs diagonally through the Fichtel from northeast to southwest. This language border does not coincide with the administrative boundary of Upper Franconia and the Upper Palatinate, but, for example, Bavarian is also spoken in the Upper Franconian district of Wunsiedel. Moreover, there are descendants of those who, after World War II came from Bohemia, Moravia, Silesia and East Prussia into the Fichtel Mountains, and who make up a significant percentage of the population.

== Geomorphology ==
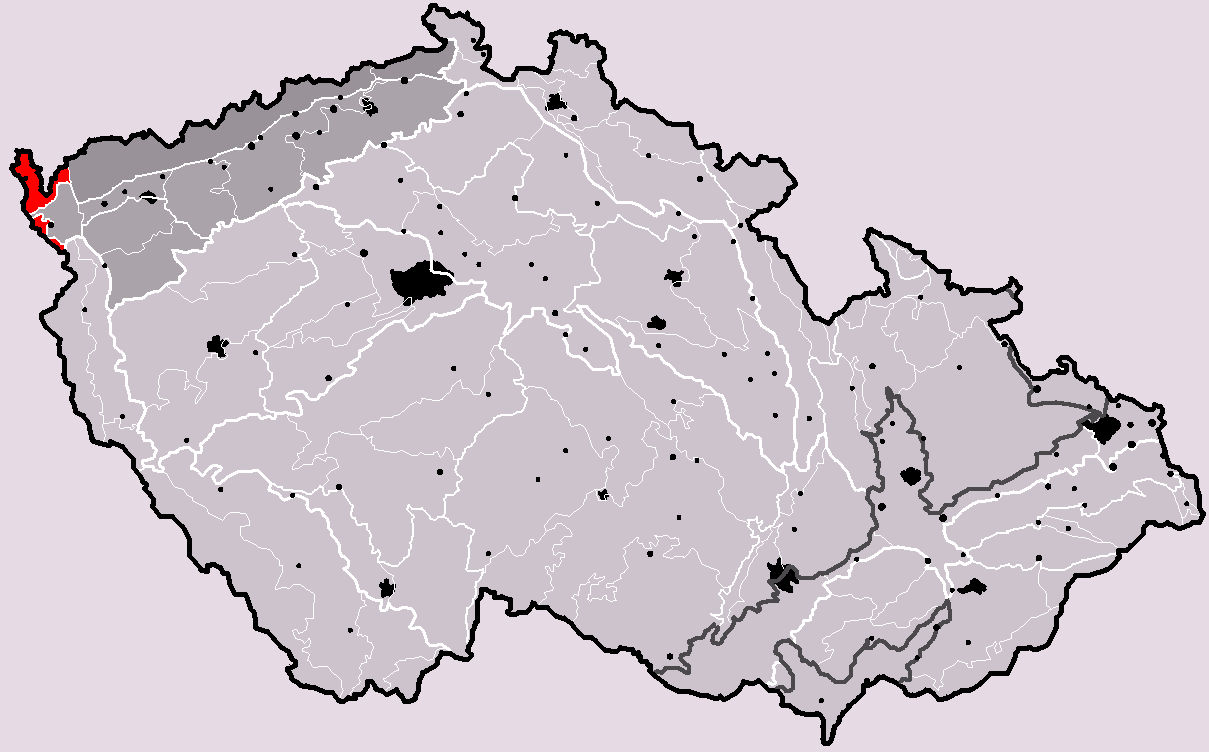
Fichtel Mountains within the division of the Czech Republic

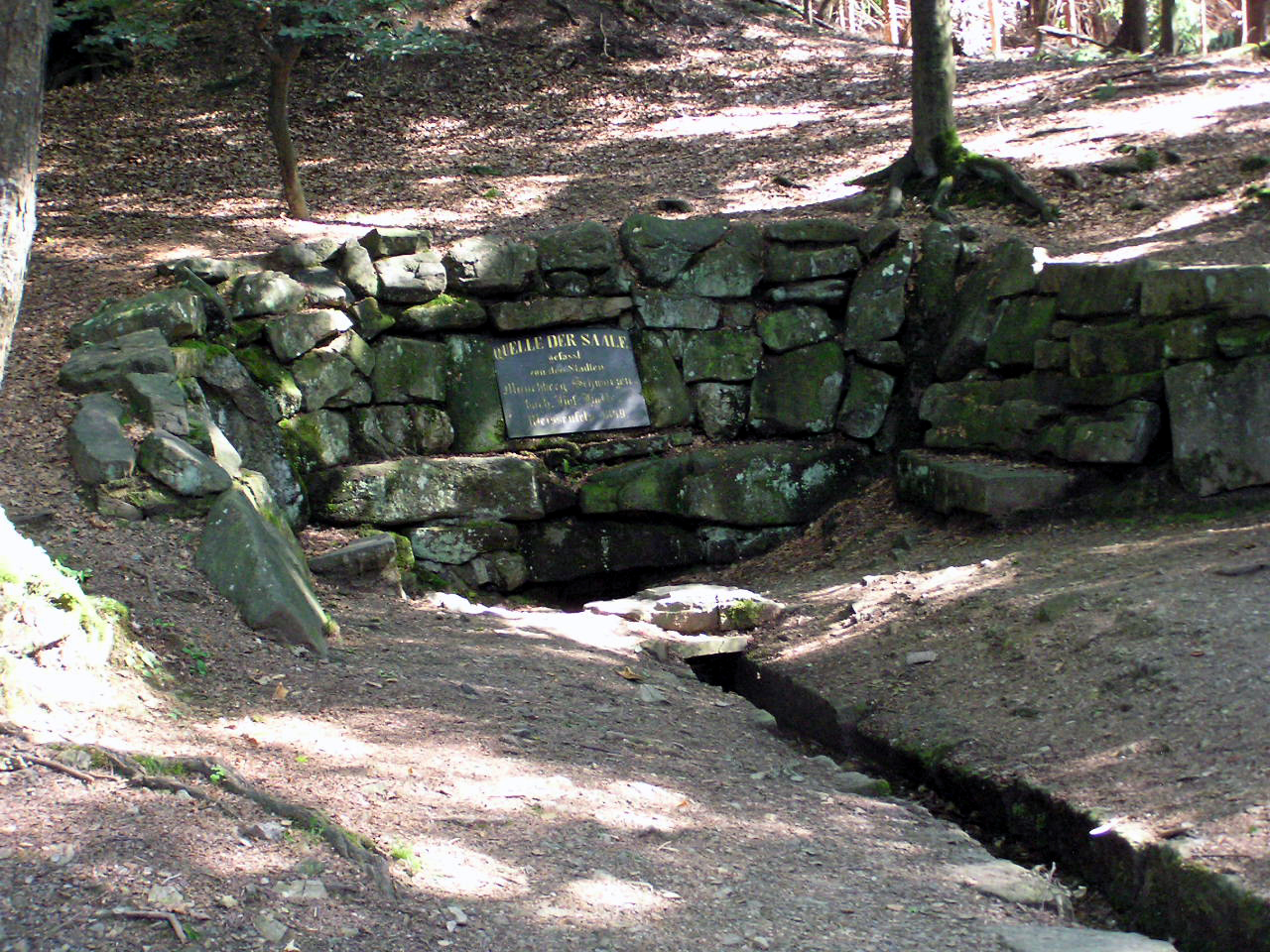
Source of the Saale

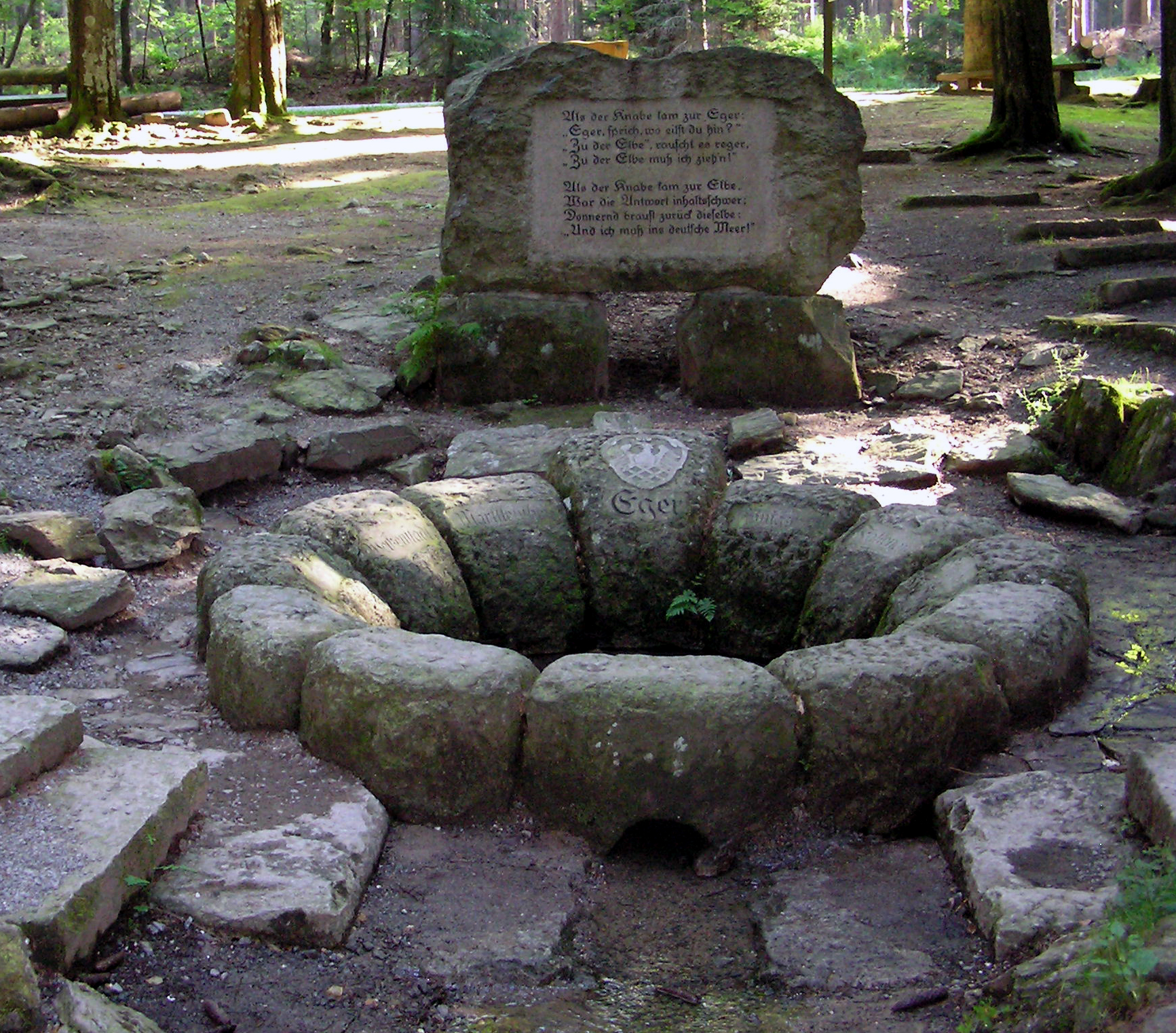
Source of the Ohře

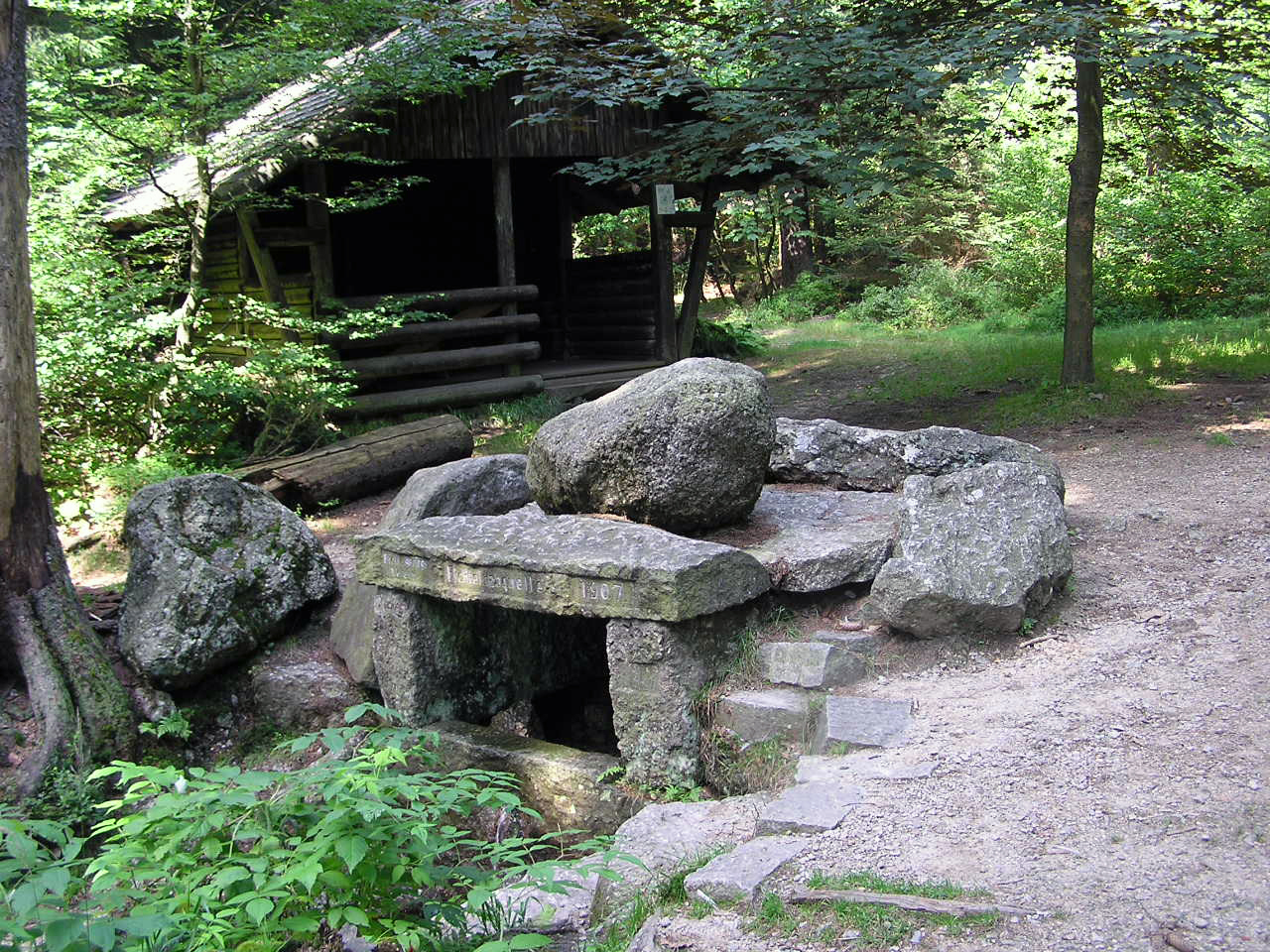
Source of the Fichtelnaab

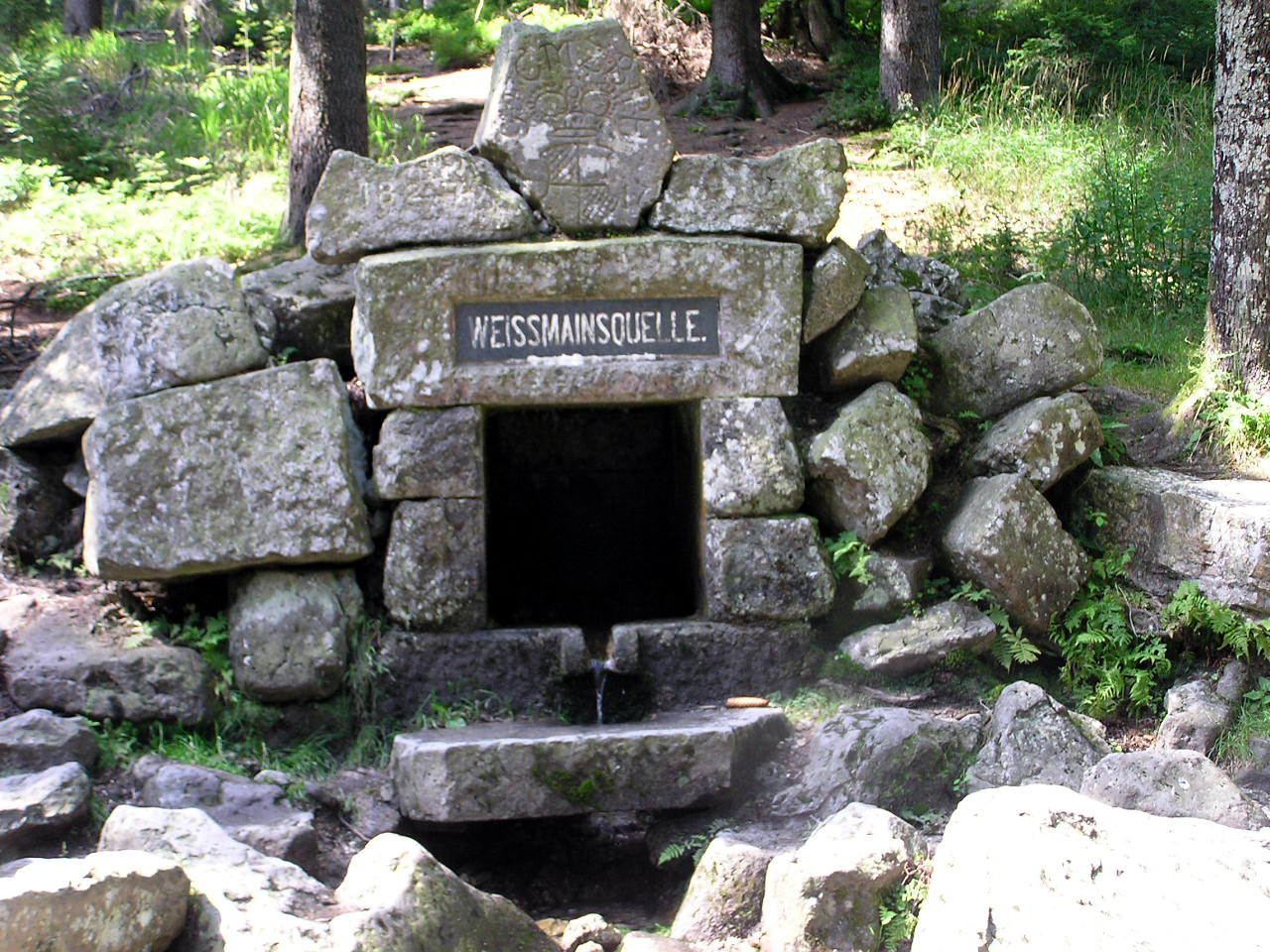
Source of the White Main

In terms of geomorphological division of Germany, the Fichtel Mountains forms a major natural region called the Thuringian-Franconian Highlands (no. D48 and 39) together with the Thuringian Forest, Thuringian Highland and Franconian Forest. In terms of geomorphological division of the Czech Republic, the Fichtel Mountains is a mesoregion within the Ore Mountains Highlands together with Ore Mountains and Elbe Sandstone Mountains. The Elster Mountains are the northwestern part of the Fichtel Mountains.

Geomorphologically the Fichtel Mountains are a horseshoe-shaped massif consisting of several linked ridges, hence the term Fichtel Mountain Horseshoe (Fichtelgebirgs-Hufeisen). The most important are the:

- High Fichtel Mountains with the Schneeberg, Ochsenkopf and Kösseine massif,
- Northern ridge of Waldstein including the mountains of Großer Waldstein, Epprechtstein and Kornberg
- Southern section with its Steinwald and Reichsforst forests and the Kohlberg mountain
- Inner Fichtel Plateau.

To the northeast the Fichtel Mountains transitions into the Ore Mountains, to the southeast is the Upper Palatine Forest, the Bohemian Forest and the Bavarian Forest. To the northwest is a clear geological divide with the Franconian and Thuringian forests. To the southwest it descends to the morphologically very different Franconian fault-block landscape.

In early times the Fichtel was known as the 'navel of Germany' (Nabel Deutschlands) or the 'wellspring of Europe' (Herzbrunnen Europas) because four important rivers rise here and flow in four different directions of the compass:

- to the north flows the Saxon Saale
- to the east flows the Ohře, known here as the Eger and its tributary, the Röslau
- to the south two headstreams of the Naab: the Fichtelnaab in the centre and the Haidenaab to one side
- to the west the White Main

Numerous moors and marshes, which are now protected, are valuable water collectors. The European watershed from the North Sea to the Black Sea runs over these mountains.

=== Mountains and hills ===
The highest mountain is the Schneeberg at 1,051 metres (3,448 ft). Rivers rising from the Fichtel Mountains are the White Main, the Saxon Saale, the Ohře and the Fichtelnaab which later joins the Waldnaab. Major towns on the edge of the mountain region are Bayreuth and Hof.

While the mountains dip gradually away to the north and the south, they form a steep slope in the west where the Red Main forms the boundary of the mountains.

The Ochsenkopf ("Ox Head") is the second highest mountain of the Fichtel Mountains, at 1,024 metres (3,360 ft). There are two chair-lifts to the summit, one from Bischofsgrün in the north and one from Fleckl in the south. The "Asenturm" (Æsir Tower) is an observation tower on the summit with a restaurant attached.

The following are the highest and best-known mountains in the Fichtel Mountains (listed with heights in metres (m) above sea level (NN):

| Mountain | Height (m) | Remarks |
|---|---|---|
| Schneeberg | 1,051 | Former Cold War listening post |
| Ochsenkopf | 1,024 | |
| Nußhardt | 972 | |
| Platte (Steinwald) | 946 | |
| Kösseine | 939 | |
| Großer Waldstein | 877 | |
| Hohberg (Königsheide) | 863 | |
| Großer Kornberg | 827 | |
| Hohe Matze | 813 | |
| Epprechtstein | 798 | |
| Háj | 758 | Highest mountain of the Czech part |
| Fürstenstein | 675 | |
| Kohlberg | 632 | |

== Geology ==
=== Early mountain building ===
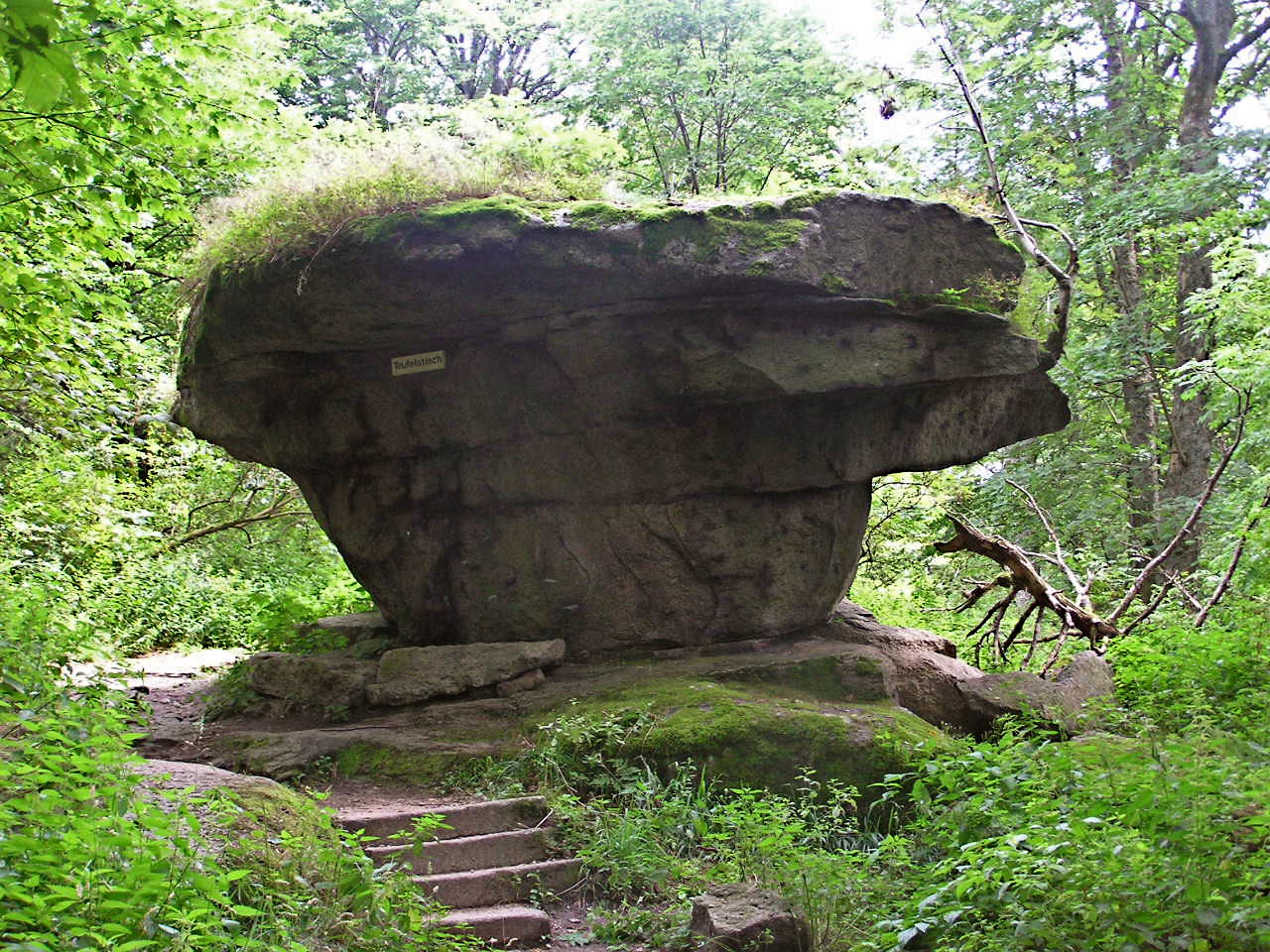
The Devil's Table, Teufelstisch, on the Großer Waldstein

Geologically the Fichtel massif consists mainly of granite. The history of its orogeny begins in the Precambrian Eon about 750–800 million years ago. From that time only the truncated uplands of the once-towering mountain chain are left.

Subsequently, the area was covered by sea, and rivers transported sediments from the old eroding mountains on the coast. These sediments were deposited as layers of clay, sand and limestone.

At the beginning of the Cambrian Period, about 570 million years ago, these beds were folded and raised up to form new mountains. High temperatures and pressure during this mountain folding process, which lasted into the Upper Carboniferous Period, created metamorphic rock. The shale layers were transformed into phyllites and schists, sandstones metamorphosed into quartzite and limestone produced Wunsiedel marble. These mountains, which may have been several kilometres high, were also eroded to sea level again.

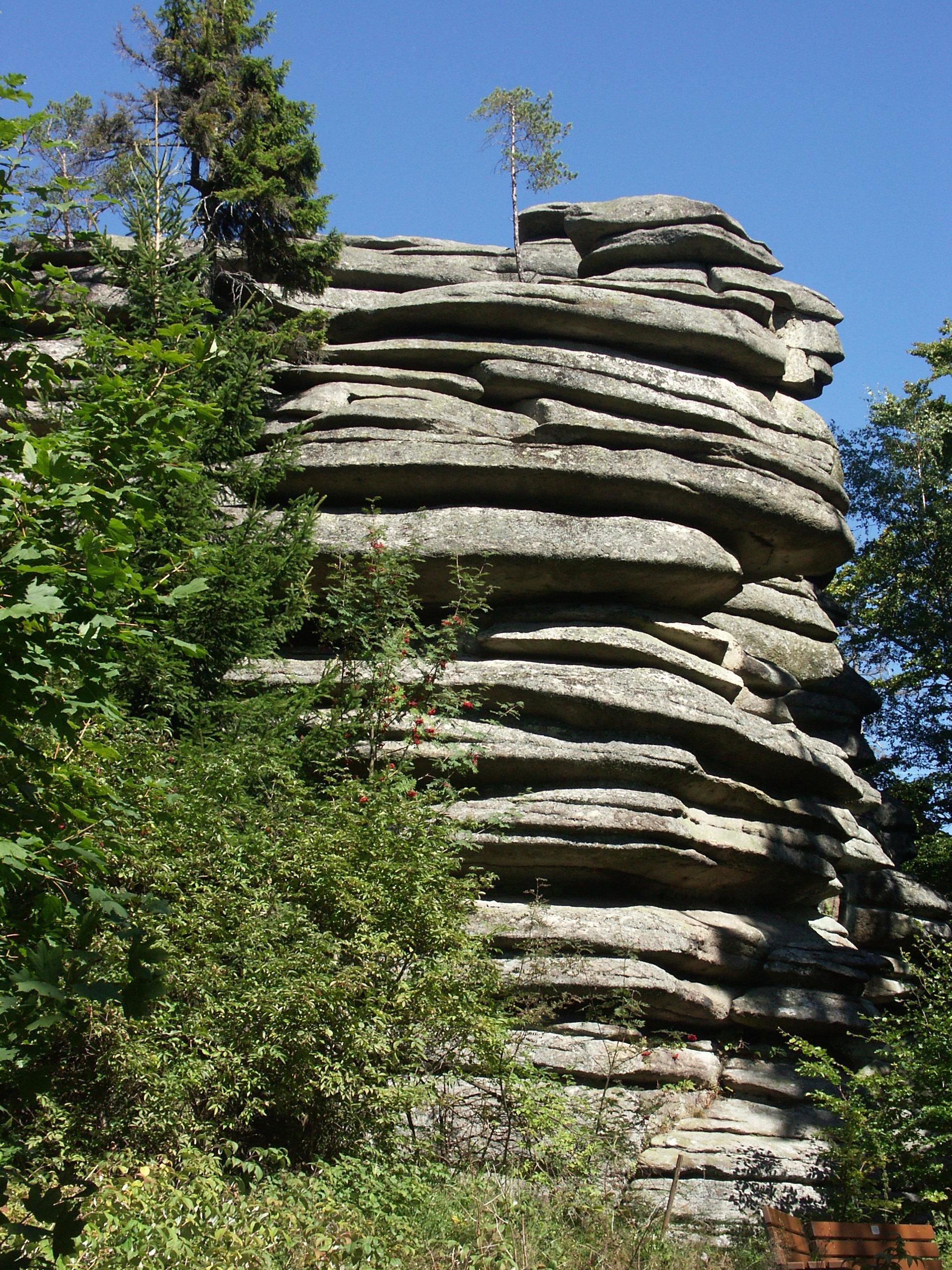
Typical granite rocks in the Fichtel Mountains: the Rudolfstein near Bad Weißenstadt

=== Variscan orogeny: mountains from the depths of the sea ===
In the next phase, great, deep-sea sediments were laid down under the present-day Fichtel Mountains and the Franconian Forest from the Silurian, Devonian and Lower Carboniferous periods; these are especially well recorded in the Franconian Forest, whose rocks were only subject to very low-grade metamorphism (associated with volcanism and ore formation) and which contain easily dated fossils. Finally, in the Upper Carboniferous period 285 million years ago, the Hercynian mountain building phase began and raised the Fichtel Mountains, Franconian Forest and Münchberg gneiss plateau into high mountains – like almost all the fold mountains formed during the Hercynian period. This mountain building episode was the Variscan orogeny, named after Hof's Latin name (and the tribe of Varisci) of Curia variscorum. At the same time, magma intruded in several phases into the folds, where it solidified under the Earth's surface into the present-day granites. As granite formed, secondary rocks were only affected by slight contact metamorphism. The rest of the molten rock with its ore-containing fluids formed pegmatite, as well as veins of ore and minerals – the basis of the medieval mining industry and early industrialisation of this region.

During the Upper Carboniferous and Lower Permian (Rotliegendes) large quantities of rock debris were deposited in intramontane basins and onto the foreland of the mountain range. These basins were formed by extensional tectonics which were accompanied by an intermediate to acidic volcanism. The sediments of the Rotliegendes are only exposed in a few places, but have been confirmed across a wide area by drilling beneath the platform southwest of the Franconian Line. Late Variscan volcanic rocks occur in the Fichtel Mountains as layers of rhyolite.

=== Alpine orogeny creates new pressures ===
In the neogene (Upper Tertiary beginning 26 million years ago) period, tectonic activity increased again – just as the Alpine orogeny (Alps, Carpathians etc.) slowly came to an end. In that time, parts of this and other older massifs (such as the Bohemian-Moravian Highlands or Bohemian Massif in the Alpine foothills) sometimes ended up underneath younger rock. In the Upper Miocene (10 million years ago), molten basalt broke through in northern Upper Palatinate as the Eger Graben was being formed. Through erosion, the remains of former diatremes have been uncovered and may be seen e.g. on the Rauher Kulm or at Parkstein near Weiden. Basaltic surface layers, i.e. extensive flows of low-viscosity lava, are visible e. g. on the Teichelberg near Pechbrunn. These basaltic nappes should not however be confused with the formation of tectonic layers.

The formation of the present landscape finally took place in the younger Pliocene about 5 million years ago: an earlier-formed Franconian fault line came under pressure again and the Fichtel Mountains, Franconian Forest, the Münchberg Gneiss Massif and the northern Upper Palatine Forest were uplifted along it. This last uplift gave the forces of erosion more to do again and the rivers cut deeply into the already, almost levelled, mountain range. So the present day structure was created from a plateau: a low mountain range which is being gnawed away at on all sides, with a long and varied history. Although often difficult to interpret, it is an 'Eldorado' for geologists from a wide range of specialisms.

=== Predominant rock types ===
Granite (Latin: granum for grain) and its derivatives make up about 40% of the area. This hard yet hydrous rock forms the highest peaks in the area.

In detail there is:

- Porphyritic Granite of the Bad Weißenstadt/Liebenstein massif (including the towns of Marktleuthen/Röslau) and extending into the Czech Republic as far as Haslau. The porphyry contains biotite (dark mica) and phenocrysts of feldspar up to 8 cm across.
- Reut Granite near Gefrees is, by contrast, finer with a bluish-grey hue. Selb Granite (found northeast of the upper massif near Schwarzenhammer and running through the Selb Forest and the Czech Republic into Saxony/ Elster Mountains) is fine-grained, but grey again.
- Holzmühl Granite occurs in just two small outcrops near Holzmühl, 3 km southeast of Marktleuthen and near Längenau on the Wartberg, east-northeast of Selb; medium-grained with a higher biotite content, unevenly grained microstructure.
- Redwitzite is also called Syenite Granite and occurs in the Marktredwitz/Arzberg/Thiersheim triangle; medium- and also fine-grained, its variable mineral composition produces colourations from light grey, dark grey and dark green-grey to almost black.
- Rand Granite (Dach Granite) occurs in all the prominent massifs of the Fichtel Mountains (the Ochsenkopf, the southern part of the Schneeberg and the Haberstein, the Platte to the Hohe Matze, the Kösseine and the Großer Kornberg); its groundmass is small-grained with phenocrysts of feldspar, quartz and biotite, sometimes sprinkled with muscovite as well;
- Kösseine-Rand Granite occurs on the Kösseine, including the Burgstein, Haberstein and Schauerberg, and the southern part of the Großer Kornberg massif; small- to medium-grained, porphyritic structure weak or missing; low in phenocrysts.
- Kern Granite is found in the central Fichtelberg/Ochsenkopf/Nußhardt block and on the eastern perimeter of the Schneeberg; it forms outcrops of in the shape of numerous rock formations; medium- to coarse-grained.
- Kösseine and Wolfsgarten Kern Granite. There are numerous pockets of Kösseine Granite containing hornfels, cm-large biotite-rich shreds and nodules of host rock, rounded or round quartz-feldspar rich pockets on the Kösseine massif: narrow band on the north, east and southern edge, small labyrinth, Kleinwendern quarry, Hirschensprung rock formation, Wolfstein, Hohenstein, Ochsenkopf, Hundslohe and Gregnitz valley; on the Kornberg: the Wolfsgarten forest and the south-southwestern part of the Großer Kornberg; relatively coarse, has an unusual appearance due to the blue feldspar, black biotite and richly sprinkled dark foreign bodies; Wolfsgarten Granite is somewhat lighter blue.
- Zinn Granite is restricted to the central massif and occurs on the Rudolfstein, on the Drei Brüder almost to the summit of the Schneeberg, western slope of the Seehügel, between Seehügel and Platte, Fuchsbau and Zufurt west of Leupoldsdorf; very even, medium grain; little biotite, a lot of muscovite; lighter, brighter hue.
- Rand Granite of the Steinwald massif: in the western part of the Steinwald, e. g. on the Dachsfelsen, and the northwestern part of the Grandfelsen; small-grained.
- Steinwald Granite occurs in the centre, including the Weißenstein, Platte, Katzentrögel, Reiseneggerfelsen and Hackelstein; coarse-grained.
- Friedenfels Granite is the transitional facies between the Steinwald Granite and the Falkenberg Porphyritic Granite; it forms the basement of the Pechbrunn basalt region and surfaces there at various places between the basalt nappes; porphyritic structure, especially rich in feldspar phenocrysts.

== Mining industry ==
By the Early Middle Ages man had begun to mine in the Fichtel Mountains. The most important products were gold, tin, iron, minerals, earths and rock (basalt, brown coal, diabase, granite, silt, marble, soapstone, clay and peat). In earlier times uranium ore deposits were discovered. The metals were worked in hammer mills (hence the many place names ending with -hammer) on the Fichtel's rivers, in furnaces and at metalsmiths. The forests of the Fichtel Mountains supplied the wood necessary for the manufacture of charcoal. During the Thirty Years' War the mining industry became depressed and the ore deposits were largely exhausted. In the 18th century Alexander von Humboldt tried to revive the mining industry again. Many towns and villages (e. g. Wunsiedel, Bad Weißenstadt, Arzberg, Fichtelberg-Neubau, Goldkronach) owe their emergence to the mining industry.

An insight into the history of mining in the Fichtel Mountains may be gained from:

- the visitor mine of Gleissinger Fels near Fichtelberg-Neubau
- the Schmutzler gallery near Goldkronach
- the gold mining museum in Goldkronach
- the mining exhibition in the Fichtelgebirge Museum at Wunsiedel
- the mining industry information point at Arzberg
- the local heritage and mining museum in Erbendorf

== Traditions ==
The Huguenots introduced the Easter decorations on wells, so-called Osterbrunnen, in the shape of a lily (emblem of the Bourbon kings) (as described e.g. in the April 2007 of the Fränkische Post).

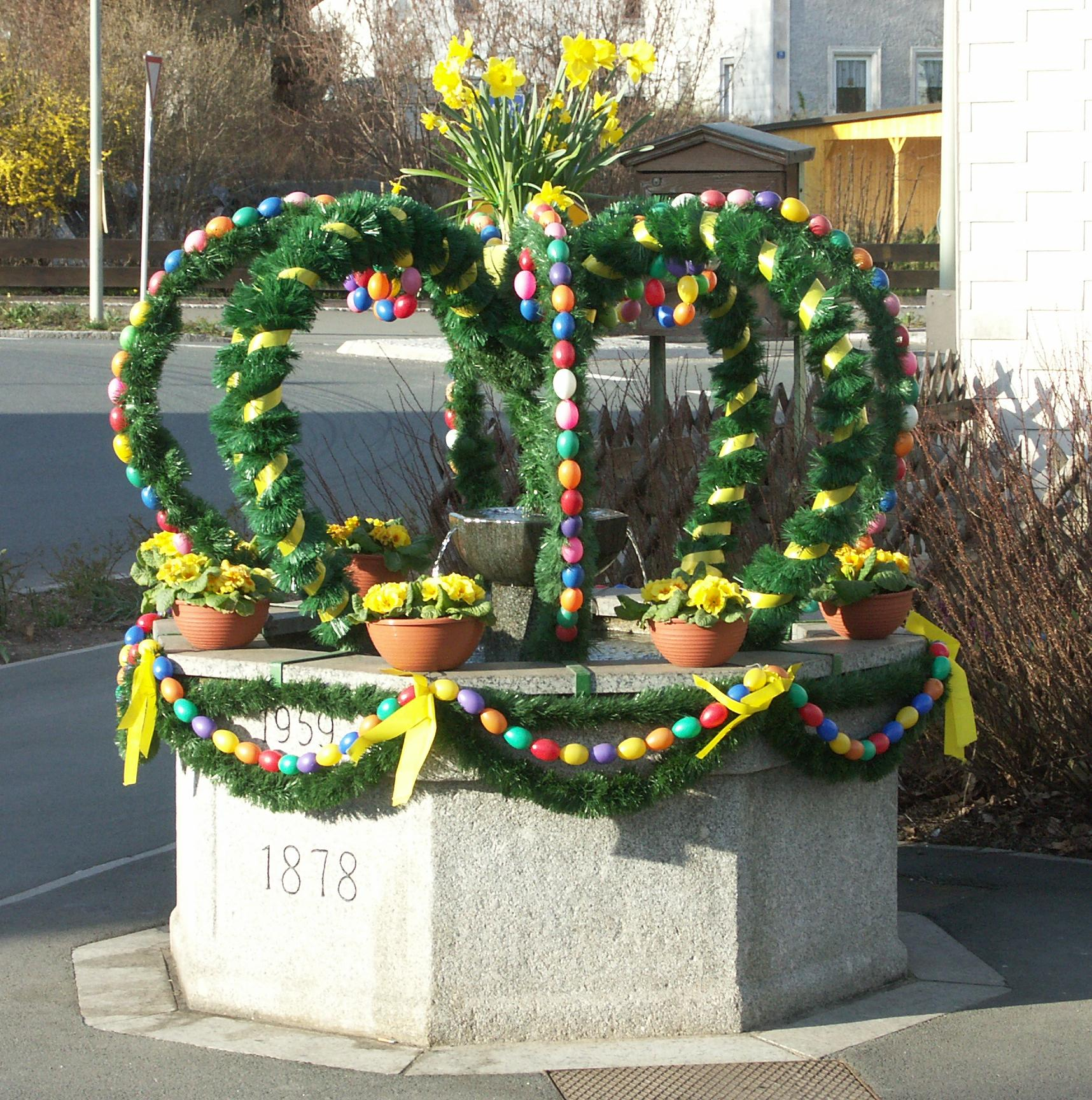
Easter well in Marktleuthen

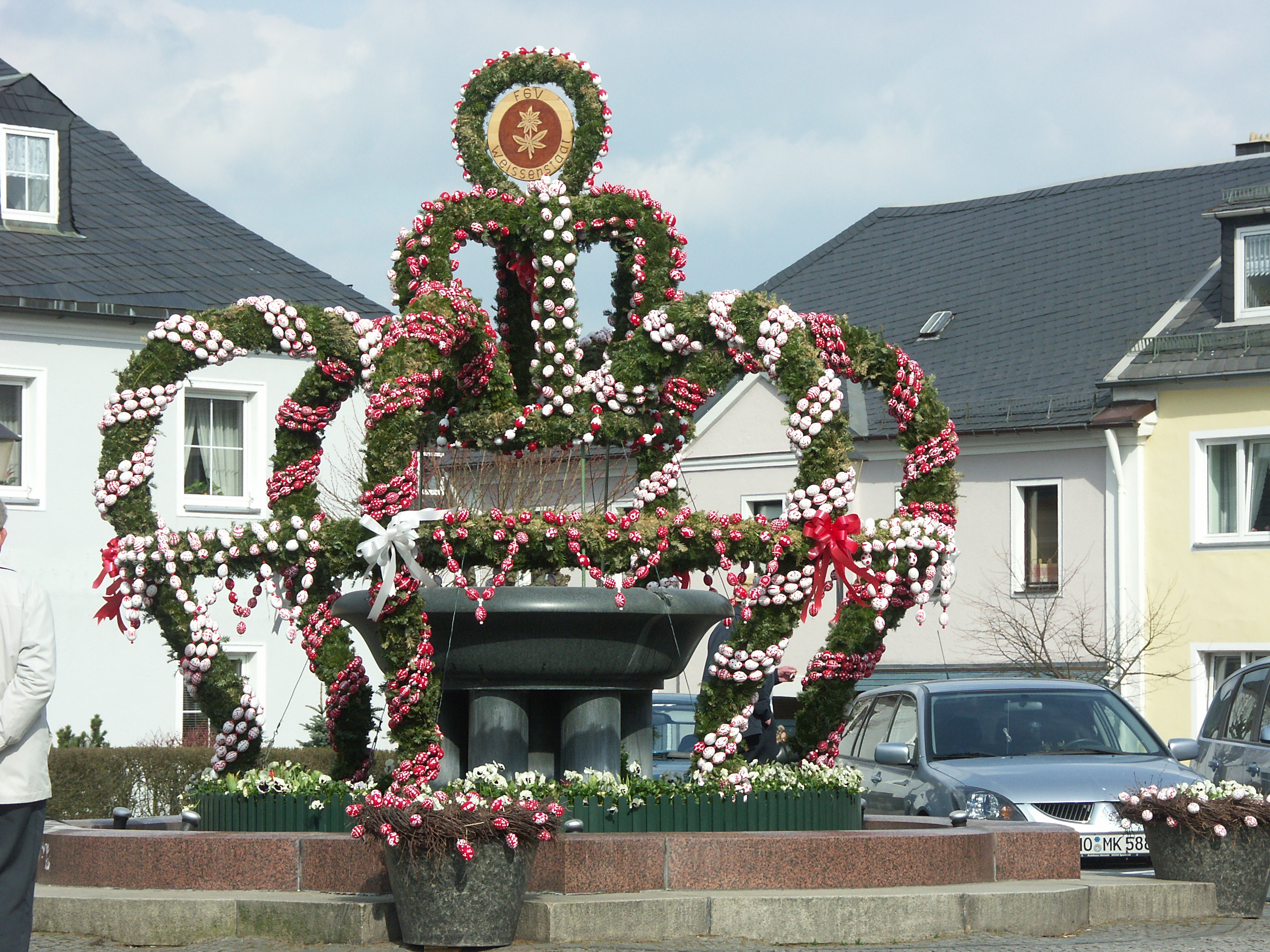
Easter well in Bad Weißenstadt

== Economy and tourism ==
There are many places in the Fichtel Mountains that still produce glassware at competitive prices. The porcelain industry, centred on the town of Selb, is internationally renowned and the foremost in Germany. Local firms such as Rosenthal and Hutschenreuther are of international standing.

Tourism is the main source of income for many places in the Fichtel Mountains today. In some towns such as Bischofsgrün tourism has a long tradition going back to the 1920s. After the Second World War the stream of holidaymakers increased sharply, both in summer for walking and in winter for winter sports. The Fichtel Mountains became the local mountain range (Hausgebirge) for (West-)Berliners who, unable to holiday in East Germany, were able to get there on the transit route of the A 9 motorway. This has changed since German reunification and the opening up of other mountainous holiday areas.

The Fichtel Mountains are a nationally important holiday destination in winter. Several lifts, the longest being two chair lifts on the Ochsenkopf, but also a plethora of cut cross-country trails are the mainstay of this industry.

The Fichtel Mountains attract many tourists throughout the year. In the winter the mountains are a common destination for people seeking outdoor recreational sports like alpine skiing, cross country skiing, and sledding. The warmer summer months find people mountain biking, hiking, and sight seeing amongst the many large rock formations.

== Settlements ==
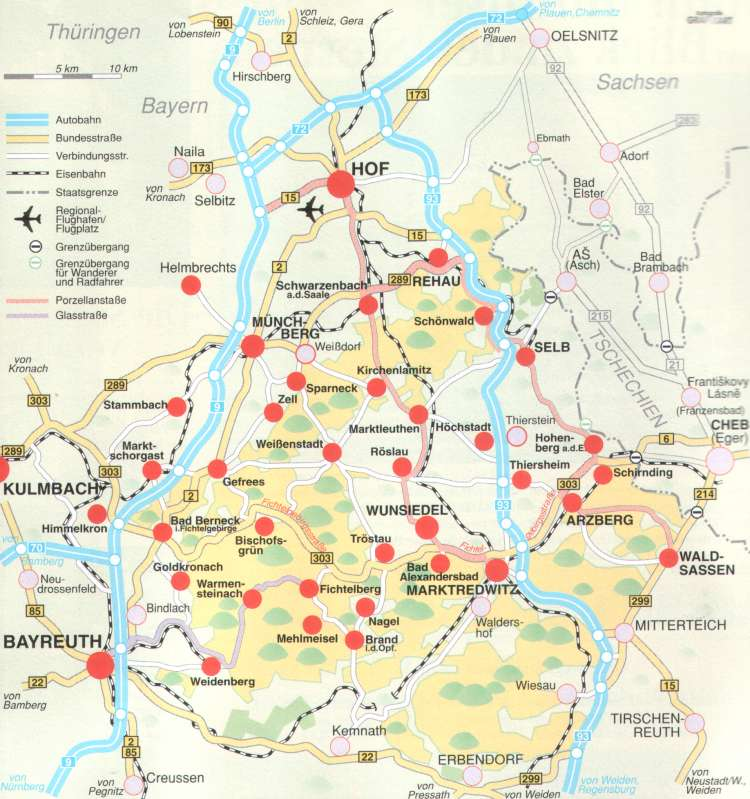
Places in the Fichtel Mountains

- Arzberg
- Aš
- Bad Berneck
- Bad Weißenstadt
- Bindlach
- Bischofsgrün
- Brand (Oberpfalz)
- Ebnath
- Erbendorf
- Fichtelberg
- Gefrees
- Goldkronach
- Hazlov
- Höchstädt im Fichtelgebirge
- Hranice
- Kemnath
- Krásná
- Kirchenlamitz
- Luby
- Marktleugast
- Marktleuthen
- Marktredwitz
- Marktschorgast
- Mehlmeisel
- Münchberg
- Nagel
- Neusorg
- Plesná
- Podhradí
- Rehau
- Röslau
- Schirnding
- Schönbrunn
- Schönwald
- Selb
- Skalná
- Sparneck
- Speichersdorf
- Thiersheim
- Thierstein
- Tröstau
- Waldershof
- Warmensteinach
- Weidenberg
- Weißdorf
- Wunsiedel
- Zell im Fichtelgebirge

== Approaches ==
- Rail: Marktredwitz station has rail services to Eger, Regensburg, Nuremberg, Munich, Hof, Bayreuth, Dresden and Leipzig
- Road:
  - Federal roads (Bundesstraßen): B 303 and B 15
  - Motorways (Bundesautobahnen): A 93 and A 9
- Air: Hof-Plauen Airport

== Sources ==
- Franz X. Bogner: Das Fichtelgebirge im Luftbildportrait. Ellwanger Verlag, Bayreuth 2009 (twote Auflage). ISBN 978-3-925361-68-5.
- Dietmar Herrmann: Vom Bergbau im Fichtelgebirge. Heft 11 und 12 der Schriftenreihe „Beiträge zur Geschichts- und Landeskunde des Fichtelgebirges“, Verlag Buchhandlung Kohler, Wunsiedel
- Dietmar Herrmann: "Rund um den Großen Waldstein im Fichtelgebirge", Heft 16/2008 der FGV-Schriftenreihe Das Fichtelgebirge, HG: Fichtelgebirgsverein, Theresienstraße 2, 95632 Wunsiedel
- Reinhard Feldrapp, Bernd Häuser: Fichtelgebirge. Streifzüge durch das granitene Hufeisen. Echter Verlag 2003, ISBN 3-429-02539-7
- Dietmar Herrmann: Lexikon Fichtelgebirge. Ackermann-Verlag, Hof, ISBN 3-929364-18-2
- Reinhard Müller, Horst Ruhl: Mit Kindern im Fichtelgebirge. Wo Wandern zum Erlebnis wird. Fleischhauer & Spohn Verlag, Bietigheim 1994, ISBN 3-87230-520-4
- Gerhard Bayerl, Manfred Schultes, Bernhard Settwon: Steinmeer und Siebenstern. Druckhaus Oberpfalz 2000, ISBN 3-924350-84-1
- Karl-Heinz Mayer: Die Forstgeschichte des Fichtelgebirges. (Dissertationsschrift.) Forstliche Forschungsberichte München, Nr. 167. Frank, München 1998, 297 (VII/XI) S.
- Fichtelgebirge, Frankenwald, Coburger Land. Vom Oberen Maintal bis zum Vogtland. HB-Verlags- und Vertriebsgesellschaft 1998 (HB Bildatlas: H.190), ISBN 3-616-06290-X
- Gernot Messarius: Fichtelgebirge. Steinwald. Bayreuth, Kulmbach, Hof. Goldstadtverlag, Pforzheim 2002 (Goldstadt Reiseführer Bd. 318), ISBN 3-89550-318-5
- Godehard Schramm, Bernd-Heinz Häuser: Fichtelgebirge-Frankenwald-Steinwald. Die schönsten Ausflugsziele. Rosenheimer Verlagshaus 1992, ISBN 3-475-52732-4
- Reinhard Feldrapp, Günter Hertel: Das Fichtelgebirge. H. Stürtz, Würzburg 1984, ISBN 3-8003-0220-9
- Friedrich Wilhelm Singer, Georg Pöhlein: Fichtelgebirge. Das granitene Hufeisen. Oberfränkische Verlagsanstalt, Hof 1983, ISBN 3-921615-54-2
- Dietmar Herrmann: "Der Ochsenkopf im Fichtelgebirge", Heft 17/2009 der FGV-Schriftenreihe Das Fichtelgebirge

=== Maps ===
- Naturpark Fichtelgebirge and Naturpark Steinwald. Walking map with tourist tips, coloured path marking and car parks for walkers.. Official walking map of the Fichtelgebirge Club and Fichtel Mountains Nature Park 1:50.000 16th edn. Fritsch Landkarten-Verlag Hof (Fritsch Karten: No. 52) o. J., ISBN 3-86116-052-8
