= Fichtelberg, Bavaria =

Fichtelberg
- Municipality
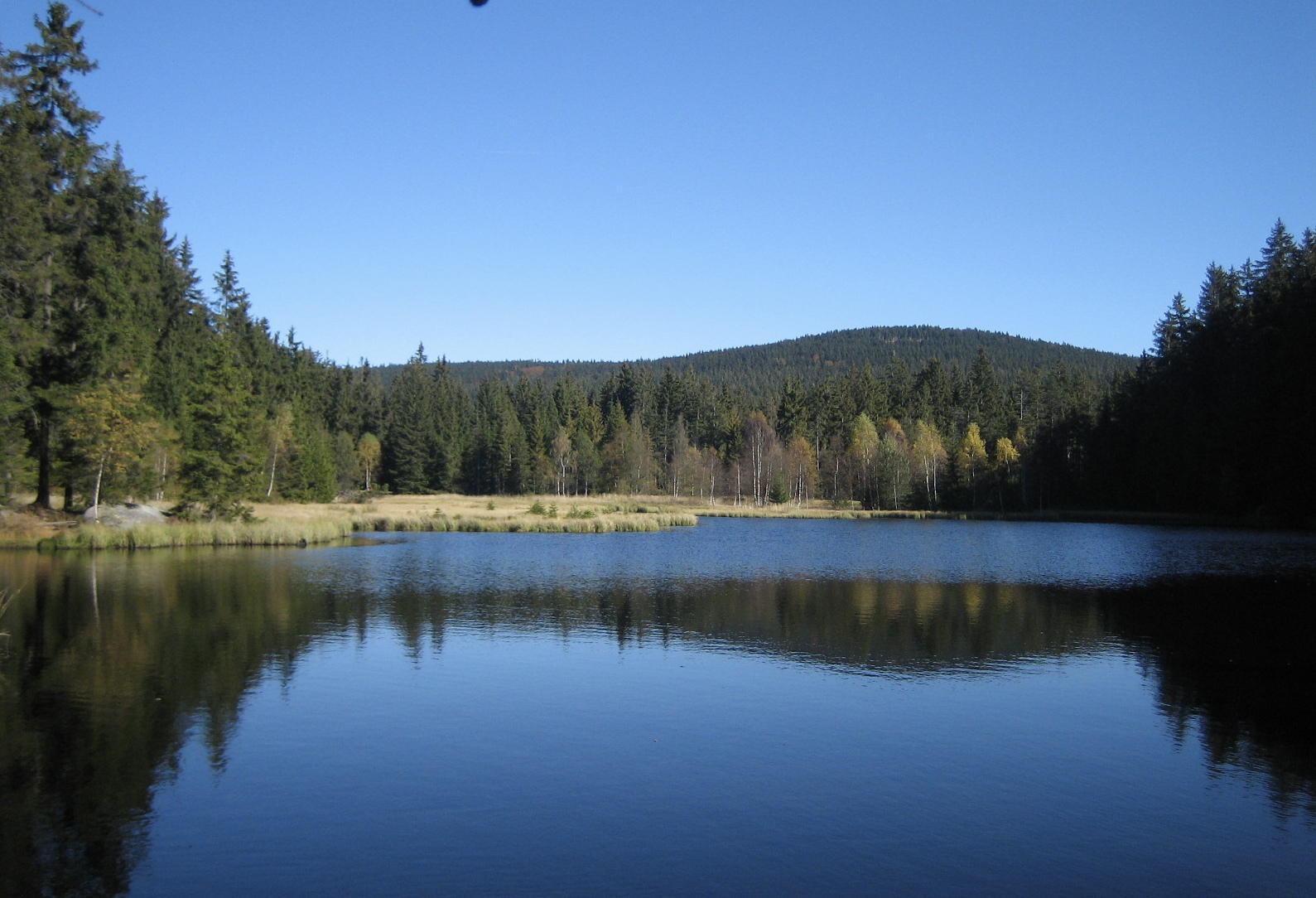
- Fichtelsee lake

- Coat of arms

- Location of Fichtelberg within Bayreuth district
- Interactive map of Fichtelberg
- Location within Germany Location within Bavaria
- Coordinates: 49°59′57.68″N 11°51′4.52″E
- Country: Germany
- State: Bavaria
- Admin. region: Oberfranken
- District: Bayreuth
- Subdivisions: 3 Ortsteile

Government
  - Mayor (2020–26): Sebastian Voit (CSU)

Area
  - Total: 5.17 km^{2} (2.00 sq mi)
- Elevation: 685 m (2,247 ft)

Population (2025-12-31)
  - Total: 1,772
  - Density: 343/km^{2} (888/sq mi)
- Time zone: UTC+01:00 (CET)
  - Summer (DST): UTC+02:00 (CEST)
- Postal codes: 95686
- Dialling codes: 09272
- Vehicle registration: BT
- Website: www.fichtelberg.de

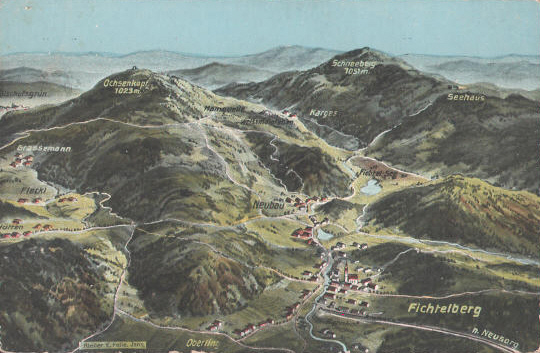
Fichtelberg (postcard around 1910/1920)

Fichtelberg (German pronunciation: [ˈfɪçtl̩bɛʁk]) is a municipality in the district of Bayreuth in Bavaria in Germany. It is a state-recognised climatic spa (Luftkurort).

== Geography ==
Fichtelberg lies on the southeastern slopes of the Ochsenkopf, the second highest summit of the Fichtel Mountains, and the most populous place in the Fichtel Mountain Nature Park. Fichtelberg lies on a major European watershed. Two rivers rise above the suburb of Neubau, the White Main, one of the two headstreams of the Main, which flows westwards to the Rhine, and the Fichtelnaab, which flows south and enters the Danube.

Since 1857 Fichtelberg has belonged to the Bavarian provinces of Upper Franconia.

=== Municipal divisions ===
- Fichtelberg
- Hüttstadl
- Neubau

=== Neighbouring parish ===
The only parish that borders immediately on Fichtelberg is Mehlmeisel.

== Etymology ==
The origin of the name Fichtelberg, as well as the Fichtel Mountains is probably to be found in mining lore and not, as long suspected, its dense, spruce forests. At the time the name originated, pollen analysis shows that in the North Bavarian region mixed forests of beech, fir and spruce existed. It was only due to the mining and smelting industry, that hardwood species were decimated and faster-growing spruce was planted to supply wood for the mines. At first, only a mountain called Vythenberg where the St. Vitus mine was located, was mentioned in a charter of 1317; this later became the Ochsenkopf. The original name later evolved into the word Vichtel or Fichtel and was eventually used for the entire terrain of present-day Fichtel Mountains. The first written record of the Viechtlpergs dates to 1508.

== History ==
The history of the site at Fichtelberg is dominated by ore mining of the mining company Erzgrube Gottesgab im Gleißingerfels am Fichtelberg. In 1600 the uppermost reaches of the Fichtelnaab valley near the present villages of Neubau and Fichtelberg was still covered with a rugged, forest-covered wilderness. Finds, such as a serpentine pendant in 1922 on the Ochsenkopf or a stone axe head excavated in 1935 east of Fichtelberg, suggest that the area around Fichtelberg was already inhabited in the Neolithic period, at least by hunters passing through. The absence of other finds, however, rules out any permanent settlement until the beginning of the 17th century. This was probably due to the steep slopes and significantly higher altitude along with a harsh climate and less fertile soils. Iron ore mining in the upper Fichtelnaab valley began in 1478, but only a small settlement of a few houses extended from the south up to the outskirts of what is now Fichtelberg today.

In 1602, Johann Glaser founded a company of six influential and financially powerful men, in order to work with them to begin mining on Gleißingerfels (about halfway between the modern villages of Hütten und Neubau), to search for suitable iron ore lodes, smelt them in blast furnaces using the most modern and profitable methods of the day and to process them profitably. The wood that was needed in large quantities in the furnaces, forges, hammers and foundries, was available in the extensive forests of the region. There was also enough water at first for the water wheels of the ironworks; when eventually the available water finally became insufficient, they promptly drove channels from the highest headstreams of the Main and the Steinach, and diverted the water. One example was the Bocksgraben. A thriving iron industry rapidly developed. Iron ore was processed in the royal foundry. At first, the mines were open cast, because the ore veins were on the surface. But eventually these pits collected too much water and there were no powerful pumps at hand. So adits were driven to enable the water to drain out. These hand-hewn tunnels were so big, that a large man could easily walk through them.

The mine on the Gleißinger Fels was called Gottesgab am Fichtelberg as was the important mining office established later far up the Fichtelnaab valley. The first accommodation huts appeared, the beginnings of a now growing and thriving mining settlement, and four furnaces smelted the silver iron that was mined in the Fichtelberg area. At this time, the region around Fichtelberg was the most important mining operation in the Electorate of Bavaria. Fichtelberg came under the Amberg Rentamt and the Waldeck district court (Landgericht) in the Electorate of Bavaria. The mining office had the legal status of a royal estate (Hofmark). In 1808 the Fichtelberg Mining Office, as a border region, changed hand repeatedly between the Kingdom of Bavaria and Margrave of Bayreuth. Since 1857, when the district of the then Bayreuth District Court was enlarged, it has been part of the province of Upper Franconia. Ore mining and smelting had been the economic factor in Fichtelberg, but with the beginning of industrialization, ore mining became less and less profitable. On 26 March 1859 work ceased and, in 1862, the mining company closed. It was initially followed by an economic decline which could only be partially compensated for by quarrying of granite and 'greenstone' (Proterobas), which had already since been worked on the Ochsenkopf massif since the beginning of the 17th century - and which was used especially for glass production - and by the timber industry. Many residents left the area.

After the Second World War, settlers came, mainly glass blowers from Gablonz, and helped Fichtelberg to renewed prosperity as an industrial site based on the glass and button production.

Since then it has largely lost its industrial importance, but survives because of its scenic location on the southwestern slope of the Ochsenkopf, mainly from tourism, and its function as a winter sports centre.

The Gleißinger Fels mines are the oldest in northern Bavaria and are the only silver iron (Silbereisen) mine in the world, which is still accessible to the public.

== Tourism ==
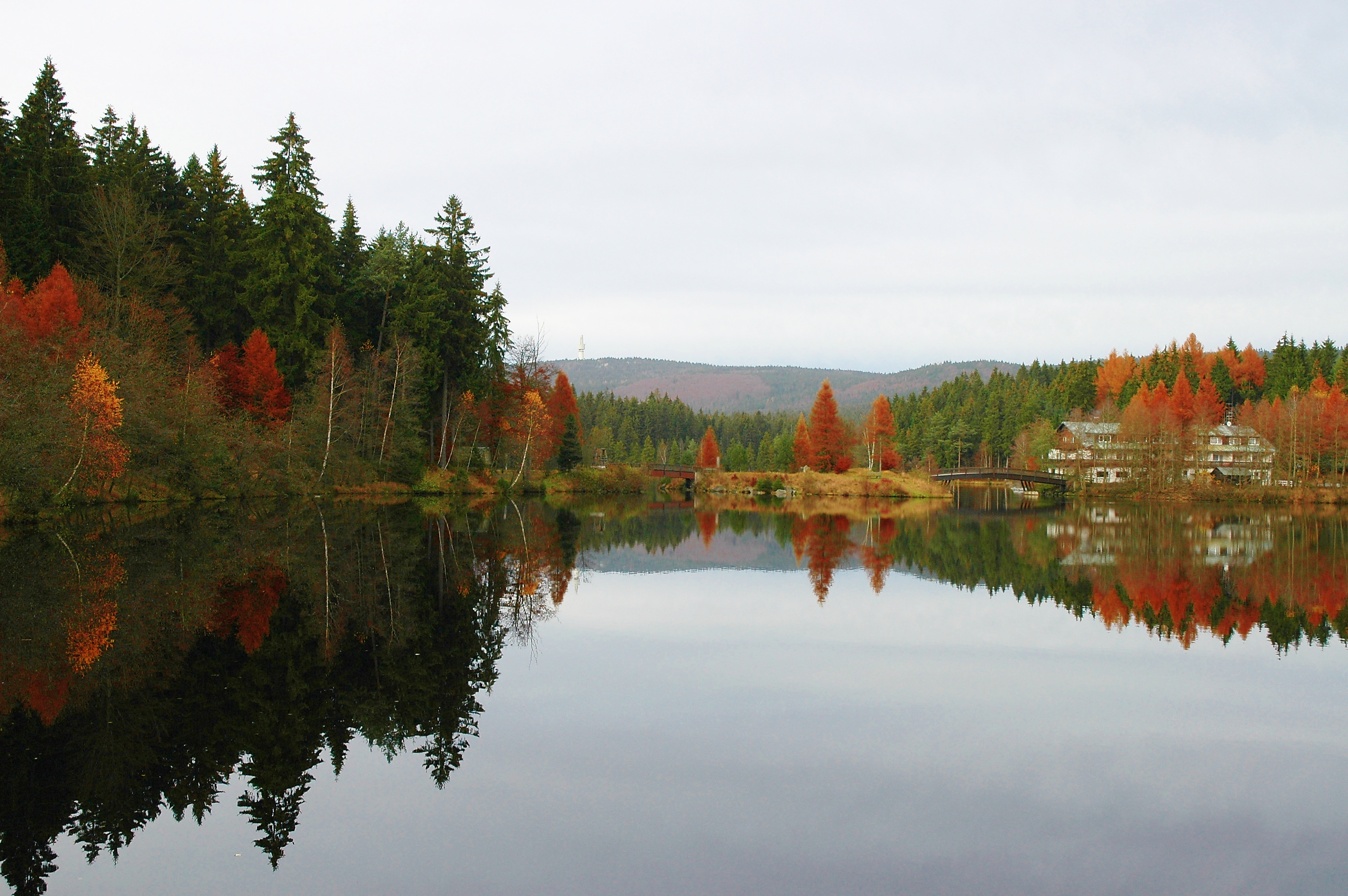
view from south on lake Fichtelsee, close to campsite

- 1,100 beds in the hotels, inns, guest houses, holiday homes and private homes
- Highest campsite in northern Bavaria

== Government ==
=== Parish council ===
The council has 14 members:

- CSU 5 seats
- Christlich Sozialer Förderkreis 2 seats
- Freie Wähler (independents) 2 seats
- Wählergruppe Fichtelberg 2.0 3 seats

(as at local elections in 2014)

=== Mayor ===
The mayor (Bürgermeister) is Sebastian Voit (CSU), elected in 2020.

== Culture and points of interest ==
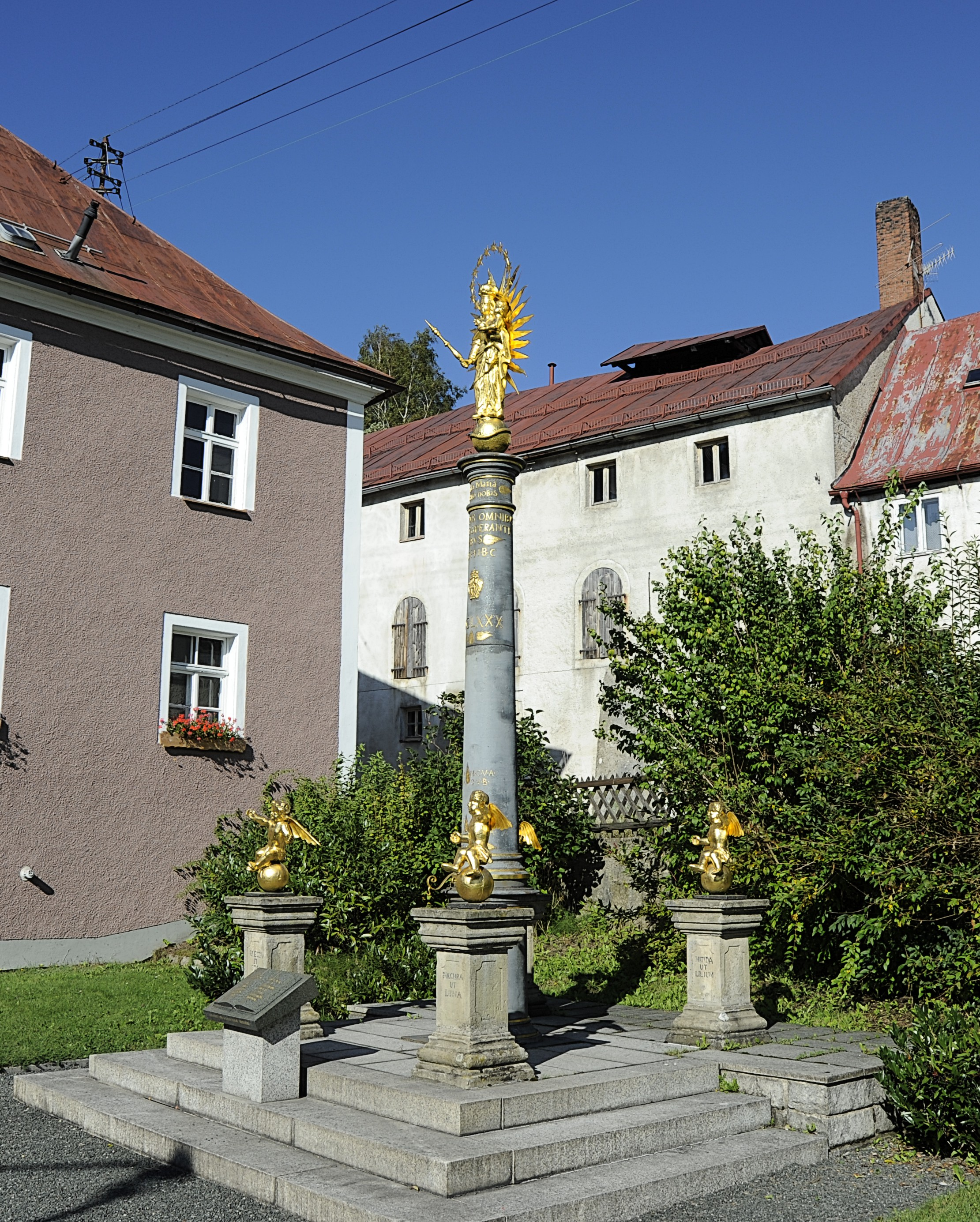
Column with 4 putti

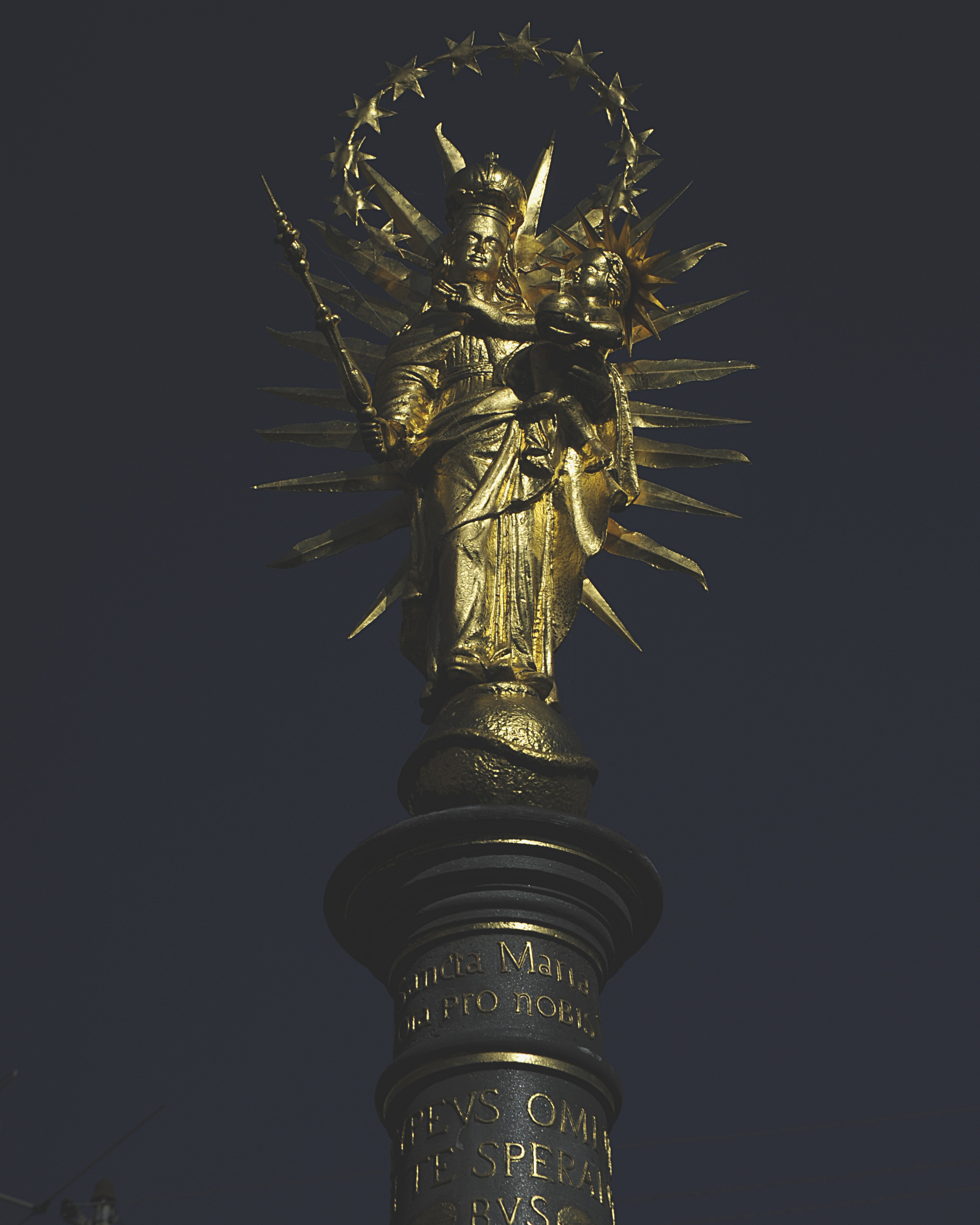
Marian sculpture

Baroque Marian column with 4 putti
- Baroque mining office church (Roman Catholic) 1708 to 1711, with altar from 1730 and wood carvings. The baroque glass windows in the altar room have mining motifs. Currently they are fully restored.
- Baroque Marian column in 1680
- Historic greenstone glassworks on the southern slope of the Ochsenkopf (archaeological excavations)

=== Sport ===
- Fichtelsee recreation centre with nature reserve
- Guided walks
- Curling
- Ice skating
- Minigolf
- Mountain biking
- Kegeln
- Skilift
- Night langlauf trail

=== Sport ===
- Bleam'l Alm ski centre

=== Museums ===
- AMF car museum
- Mühlgüt'l village museum
- Gleißinger Fels visitor mine

== Transport ==
Fichtelberg lies about 3 kilometres south of the B 303 and not far from the A 9 motorway from Berlin-Nuremberg, exit Bad Berneck or, from Berlin, Gefrees.
