= Leupoldsdorf =

Human settlement in Germany

Coordinates: 50°01′45.67″N 11°56′10.63″E

Leupoldsdorf is a village in the municipality of Tröstau in the district of Wunsiedel im Fichtelgebirge in Bavaria, Germany.

== Geography ==
Leupoldsdorf is located in the Fichtel Mountains in the province of Upper Franconia in northeast Bavaria. The river Röslau flows through area, but numerous smaller rivers also originate here. The village is surrounded by thick forest which covers the whole of the Schneeberg massif and only opens up in the direction of Wunsiedel. In addition it lies at the foot of the Platte, a mountain on which there are giant sheets (Platten) of granite. A somewhat lower-lying granite quarry can be seen from a long way off.

Between Vordorfermühle and Leupoldsdorf is the village of Waffenhammer, a small settlement south of Röslau. The Röslau also divides the eastern half of Leupoldsdorf from the village of Leupoldsdorferhammer where there was formerly a hammer mill next to the old castle.

== Tourism ==
In the village there is the castle inn, a 700-year-old building with attached beer garden. Leupoldsdorf is used as an excursion point for walks and there are several bed and breakfast establishments in the village.

A geological-historical trail explains the geology of the region using display boards. In addition a new educational trail has been laid in the forest. Immediately next to that is the Petzelweiher, a bathing lake (Badeweiher) with a kiosk. There is a tennis court adjoining it. North of Leupoldsdorf is the hamlet of Strudelweiher.

== Societies ==
An event known as the Leupoldsdorfer Kirwa is known throughout the Fichtel Mountains and organisied by the local student society (Burschenverein). The society also puts up the village maypole. The volunteer fire service (Freiwillige Feuerwehr) holds a popular "fireman's festival" every year. Another established club is the choral society, which has also had a children's and youth choir for over ten years.

== Buildings ==
The old Leupoldsdorf schoolhouse is used today as a community hall. Today the local primary school is in Tröstau, the secondary school with 5th and 6th forms in Nagel and the 7th to 9th forms in Tröstau.

== Transport links ==
Leupoldsdorf lies on the crossroads between the B 303 and Weißenstadt. There is also a local road to Tröstau, Schönbrunn and the Vordorf Mill (Vordorfermühle). The road from Leupoldsdorf to Hildenbach via the Hilden Mill (Hildenmühle) is closed to motorised vehicles. The B 303 links the A 9 and A 93 motorways and is the main transport route for cross-border traffic to the Czech Republic.

In former times Leupoldsdorf had its own station and was the terminus for the Holenbrunn-Wunsiedel-Tröstau-Leupoldsdorf branch line. The line has since been closed and the trackbed is used in places today as a cycle path leading via Wunsiedel and Selb to the Czech town of Aš.
