= Fürstenstein (disambiguation) =

Fürstenstein is a municipality in Bavaria in Germany.

Fürstenstein may also refer to:

- Książ, Lower Silesian Voivodeship (German: Fürstenstein), a village and part of Wałbrzych in Poland
  - Książ Castle (German: Schloss Fürstenstein), a castle
  - House of Hochberg, since 1848 Duke of Pless
- Fürstenstein (Fichtel Mountains), a mountain in Germany
- Prince's Stone (German: Fürstenstein), a coronation stone in Austria
