= Reichsforst (Fichtel) =

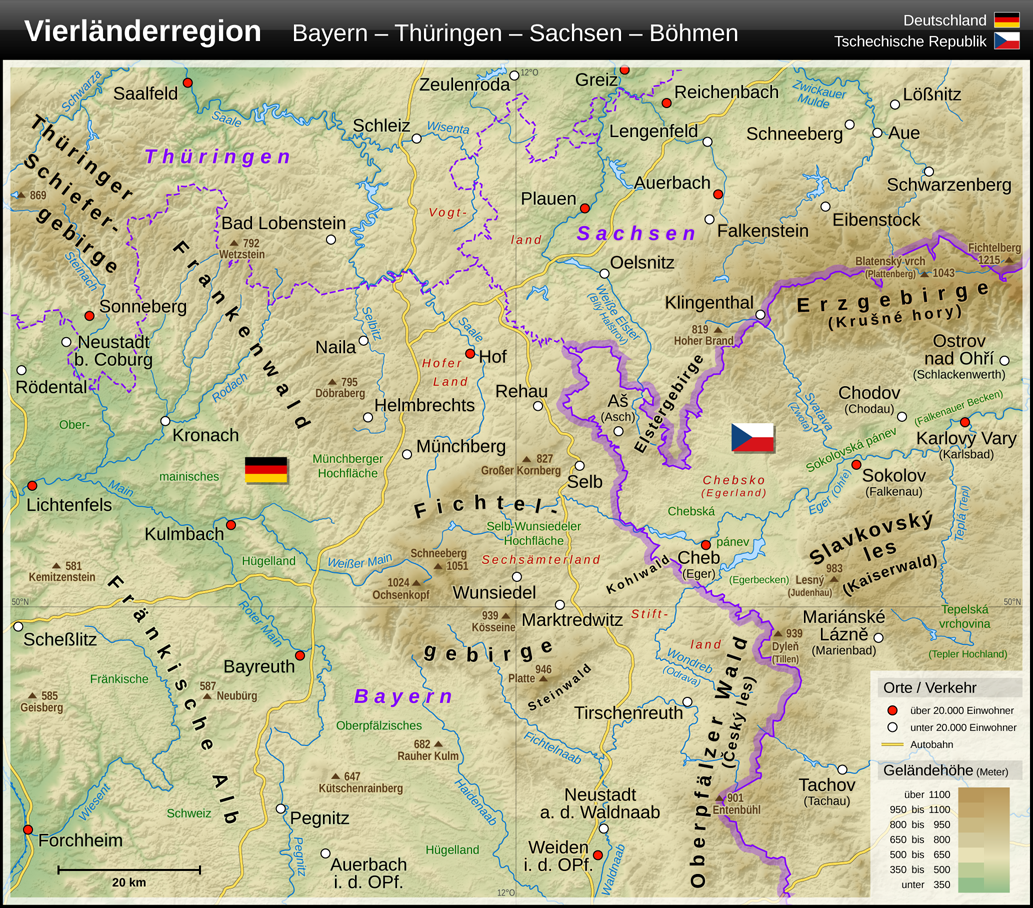
- The Fichtel Mountains in northeast Bavaria

Geography
- Location: Bavaria, Germany
- Coordinates: 49°59′N 12°12′E

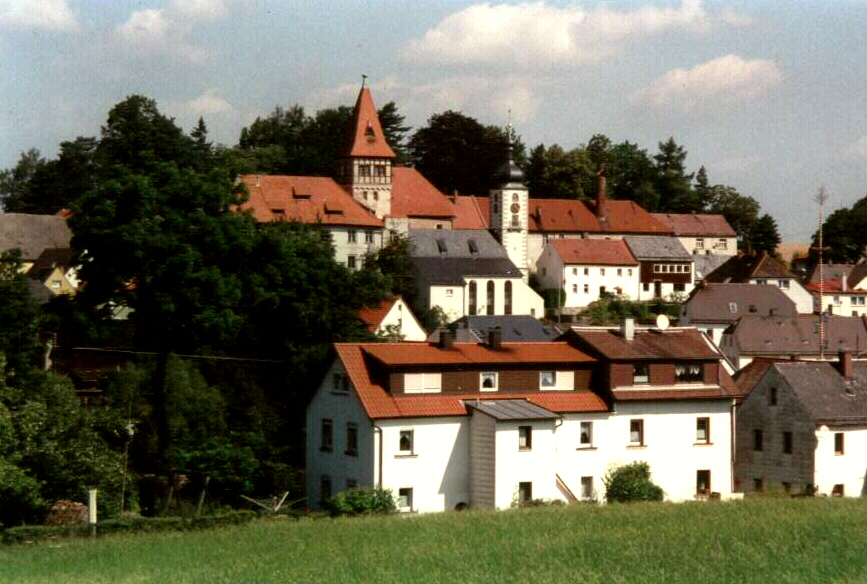
The village of Brand near Marktredwitz lies in the west of the northern rim of the Reichswald

The Reichsforst ("Imperial Forest") is a wooded area in the southeastern part of the Fichtel Mountains of southern Germany. It lies in the districts of Tirschenreuth and Wunsiedel (northeastern Bavaria), and between the Wondreb and Röslau troughs. It is also the largest contiguous basalt region of the Fichtelgebirge with an area of 26 square kilometres (10 sq mi).

== Maps ==
- Bayerisches Landesvermessungsamt: UK 50-13 Naturpark Fichtelgebirge/Steinwald östlicher Teil, Maßstab 1:50.000
