= Hohe Matze =

Mountain in Germany

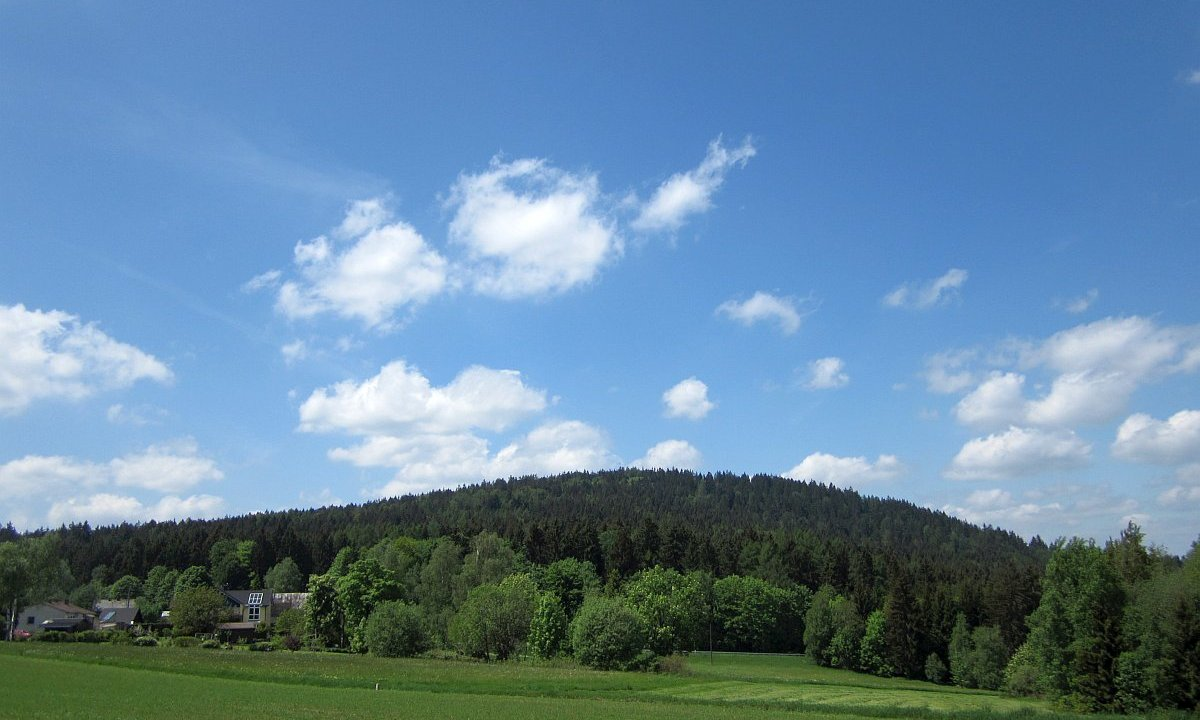
- Hohe Matze from Southeast

Highest point
- Elevation: 813 m above sea level (NN) (2,667 ft)
- Coordinates: 50°00′00″N 11°56′00″E

Geography
- Location within Bavaria
- Location: Bavaria, Germany
- Parent range: southern Fichtel Mountains

The Hohe Matze, also known as the Hohe Mätze, is a mountain in the southern part of the Fichtel Mountains of central Germany. It lies between Nagel and Tröstau, and its 813 m high summit is a jumble of oval-shaped rocks. There are numerous trails through its wooded slopes.

On the Hohe Matze was once supposed to have been the castle of Karlstein, but there is no record of it in historical documents. Its name, given in 1393 as mazen, and later as meze or mätze, translates into high German as Weideberg or "willow mountain".

The watershed between the North Sea and the Black Sea runs over the Hohe Matze, as does the 50th parallel and the Höhenweg walking trail.
