= Fichtel Mountain Nature Park =

- Naturpark Fichtelgebirge
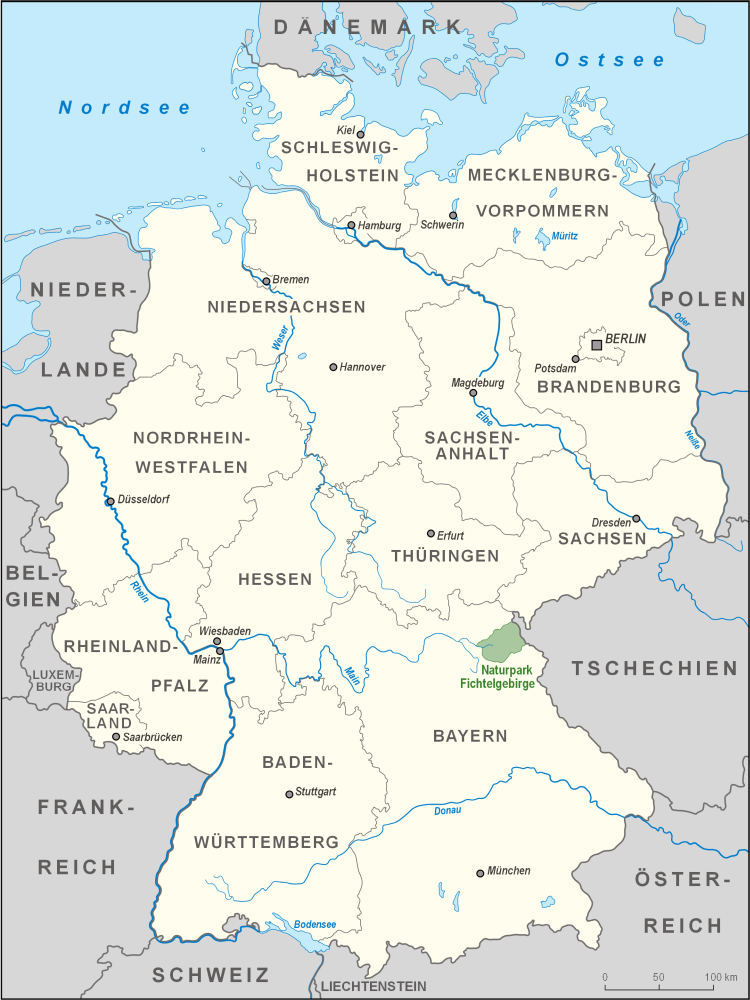
- Location of Fichtelgebirge Nature Park
- Location: Bavaria, Germany
- Nearest city: Wunsiedel
- Coordinates: 50.062°N 11.97°E
- Area: 1,020 km^{2} (390 sq mi)
- Established: 1971
- Website: www.naturpark-fichtelgebirge.org

The Fichtel Mountain Nature Park (German: Naturpark Fichtelgebirge) lies in the tri-border area of Saxony, the Czech Republic and Bavaria and has an area of 1,020 km^{2} (390 sq mi). It is maintained by the Naturpark Fichtelgebirge e. V. in Wunsiedel.

== Landscape ==
The Fichtel Mountains, with their expanse of forests and pasture land, lie on the intersection between the Thuringian Forest, Franconian Forest, Upper Palatine Forest and Ore Mountains. The Fichtel is Germany's main watershed and is a source of the rivers Main, Saale, Ohře and Naab. The highest elevations are the Schneeberg at 1,051 metres (3,448 ft) and the Ochsenkopf at 1,024 metres (3,360 ft). Its main towns are Wunsiedel and Marktredwitz.

== Leisure ==
Sporting pursuits in the area include walking, swimming, cycling and mountain biking, and, in winter skiing and ice-skating.

== Nature park information points ==
There are the following information points:

- Grassemann Open Air Museum (Freilandmuseum Grassemann)
  - Forestry, special exhibitions, subject-specific events
  - Grassemann 3, 95485 Warmensteinach
- Weißenstadt Information Shack (Infoscheune Weißenstadt)
  - Water – source of life
  - Bayreuther Straße, 95163 Weißenstadt
- Kleiner Johannes Mining Information Point (Bergwerksinformationsstelle "Kleiner Johannes")
  - Mining and geology
  - Altes Bergwerk 1, 95659 Arzberg
- Häuselloh Quarry (Schausteinbruch Häuselloh)
  - Extraction and working of granite
  - Europäische Natur- und Kulturlandschaft Häuselloh e. V, Hans Popp, Dürrloh 3 95100 Selb
- Zell Information Point (Informationsstelle Zell)
  - The Fichtel Mountains cultural landscape - varied habitats
  - Rathaus, Bahnhofstraße 10, 95239 Markt Zell im Fichtelgebirge

== See also ==
- List of nature parks in Germany
