= Röslau (river) =

River in Germany

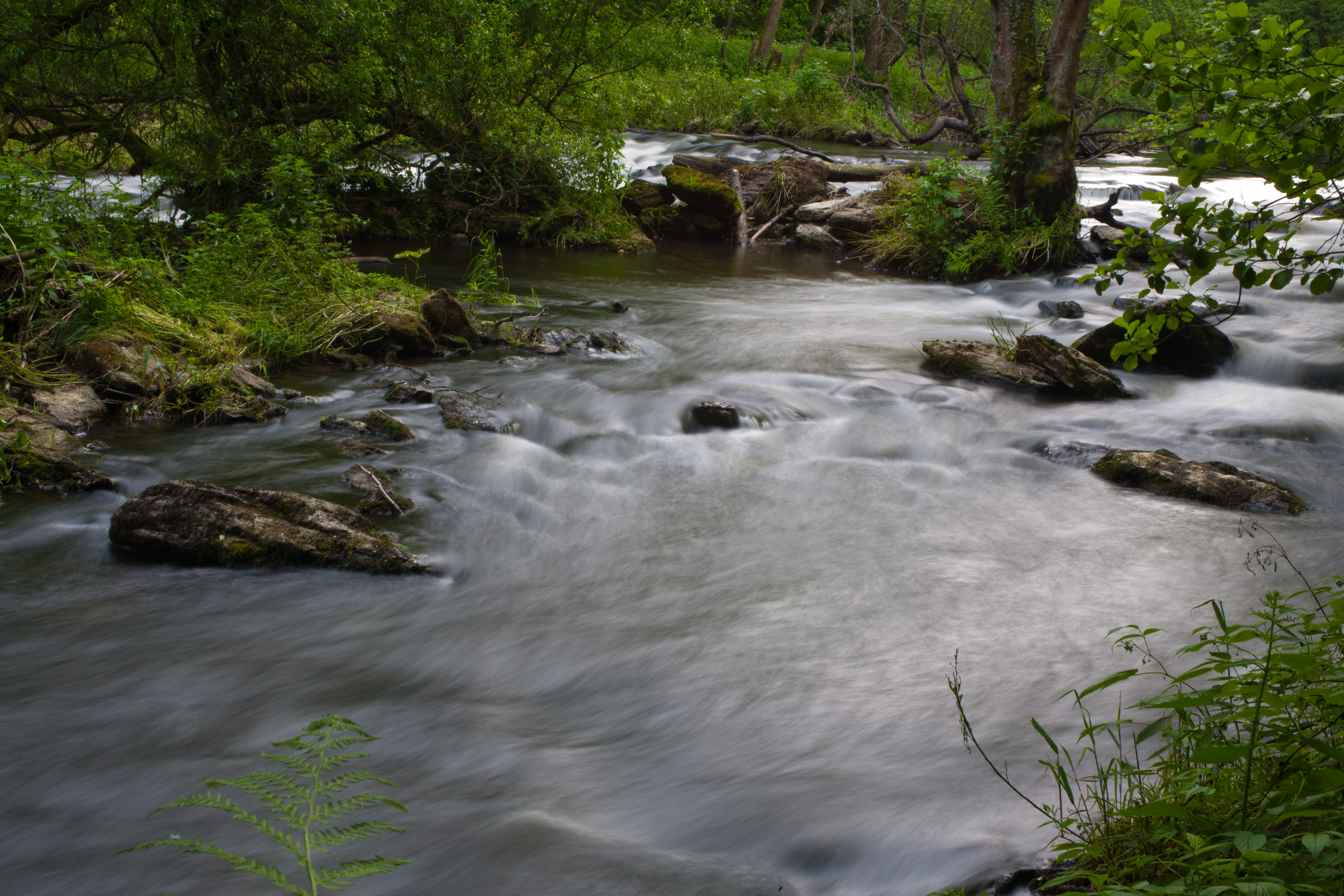
- The Röslau flowing through the Gsteinigt

Location
- Countries: Germany; Czech Republic
- State: Bavaria
- Region: Karlovy Vary
- Reference no.: DE: 53212

Physical characteristics
- Source
  - location: on the eastern slope of the Schneeberg
  - coordinates: 50°03′00″N 11°52′07″E
  - elevation: 915 m
- Mouth
  - location: near Fischern (part of Markt Schirnding) with 2 arms into the Ohře; main arm:
  - coordinates: 50°05′51″N 12°14′46″E
  - elevation: ca. 440 m
- Length: 46.4 km (28.8 mi)
- Basin size: 316 km^{2} (122 sq mi)

Basin features
- Progression: Ohře→ Elbe→ North Sea
- Landmarks: Small towns: Wunsiedel, Marktredwitz, Arzberg; Villages: Tröstau, Schirnding
- Tributaries
  - right: Kössein

The Röslau or Rösla (Czech: Reslava) is a right-hand tributary of the river Ohře in northeast Bavaria in Germany.

It is formed from several small tributaries that come together on the eastern slope of the Schneeberg west of the Vordorf Mill (Vordorfermühle) at Trostau in the Russel forest division.

== Spring tapping ==
A spring, impounded by granite rocks, was tapped by the town of Wunsiedel in 1930 at a height of 915 m above NN. The source is the start point of the 44 km long Röslau Path, which was created in 1980 by Fichtelgebirge Club. The Seenweg path from Weißenstädter See to the Fichtelsee runs past the spring.

== Course ==
After leaving the steep slopes and high forest on the Schneeberg the Röslau runs past the Vordorf Mill, turns initially southeast to Leupoldsdorf and Tröstau, grazes Wunsiedel and swings gradually in an easterly and northeasterly direction. Along the way it picks up numerous brooks from the region of the Platte, Hohe Matze and Kösseine. Near Thölau the great railway bridge on the Marktredwitz to Hof line stretches across the Röslau valley. Next it reaches Lorenzreuth and Seußen, where it is reinforced by the Kössein. It flows through the narrow valley of the Gsteinigt to Arzberg and snakes through pastureland to the Schirnding. East of the village it forms Germany's boundary with the Czech Republic until it discharges into the Eger near Fischern.

== Economic usage ==
Since the Middle Ages the river was used to drive the many hammer mills and corn mills along its length. The town of Wunsiedel also used the watercourse from the 16th century for timber rafting.

== Origin of the name ==
The river was first mentioned in 1403 by the name of Rosslin under various spellings. Colloquially it is called the Riasla and, on official maps, the Röslau. Recent research suggests the name combines words meaning "in lively motion, stirring" and "flowing" or "streaming."
