= Háj (Fichtel Mountains) =

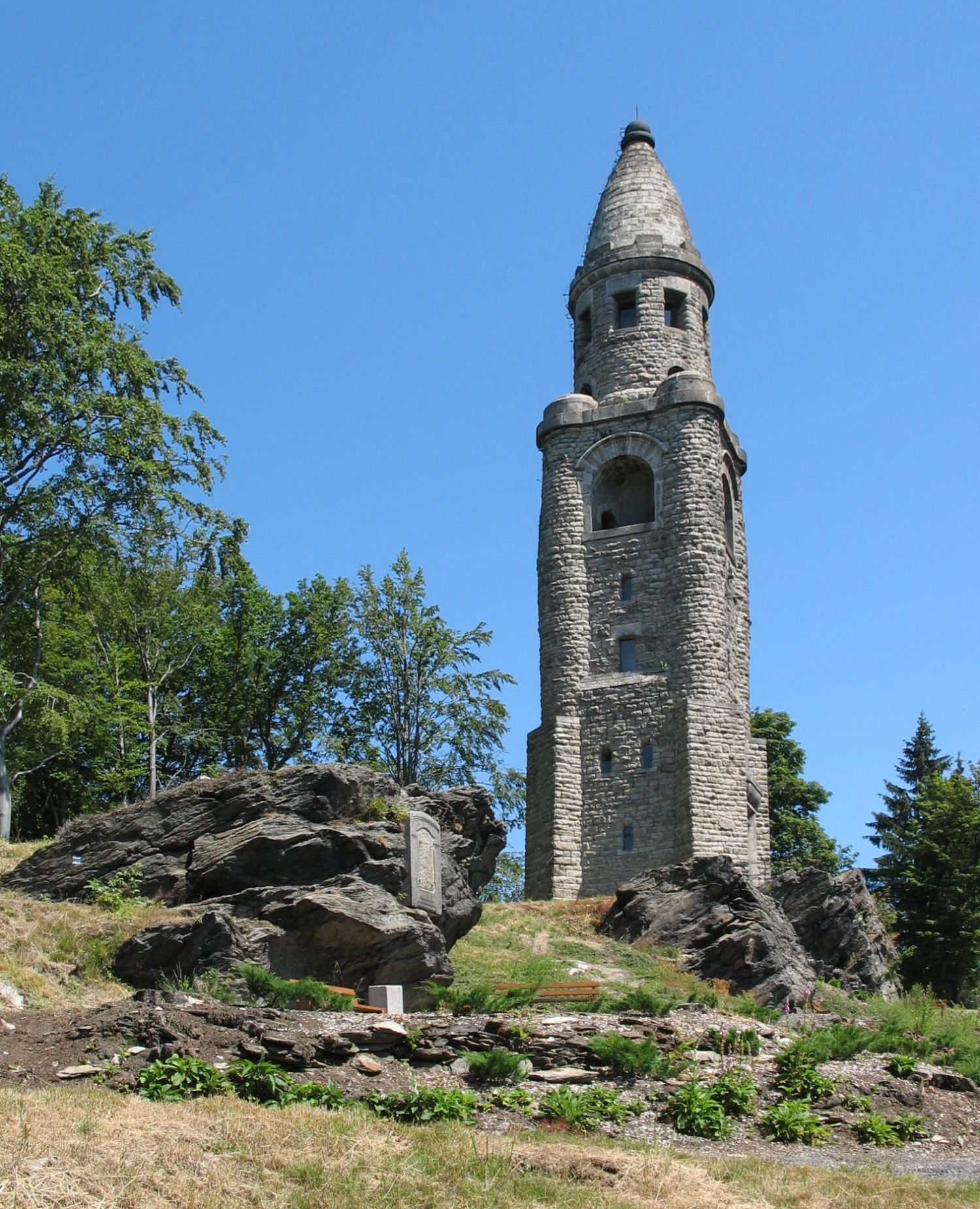
- Háj u Aše observation tower

Highest point
- Elevation: 757.6 m n.m. (2,486 ft)
- Prominence: 107 m (351 ft)
- Isolation: 8.6 km (5.3 mi)
- Coordinates: 50°14′01″N 12°12′06″E

Geography
- Location within Czech Republic
- Location: Czech Republic
- Parent range: Fichtel Mountains

Geology
- Mountain type: Ridge
- Rock type: Schist

Háj (German: Hainberg bei Asch, 758 m) is the highest mountain in the Czech part of the Fichtel Mountains. It lies near Aš in the Czech Republic. On the summit there is a mountain inn that was destroyed by fire and an observation tower.

== Location ==
In terms of the geomorphological division of the Czech Republic, the mountain is located in the district of Háj Highlands within the microregion of Aš Highlands of the Fichtel Mountains and is the highest mountain of the Fichtel Mountains. The mountain is located between the watercourses of the Ašský Stream and the White Elster. The mountain is entirely located in the municipal territory of Aš in the Karlovy Vary Region, northeast of the built-up area of the town.

== History ==
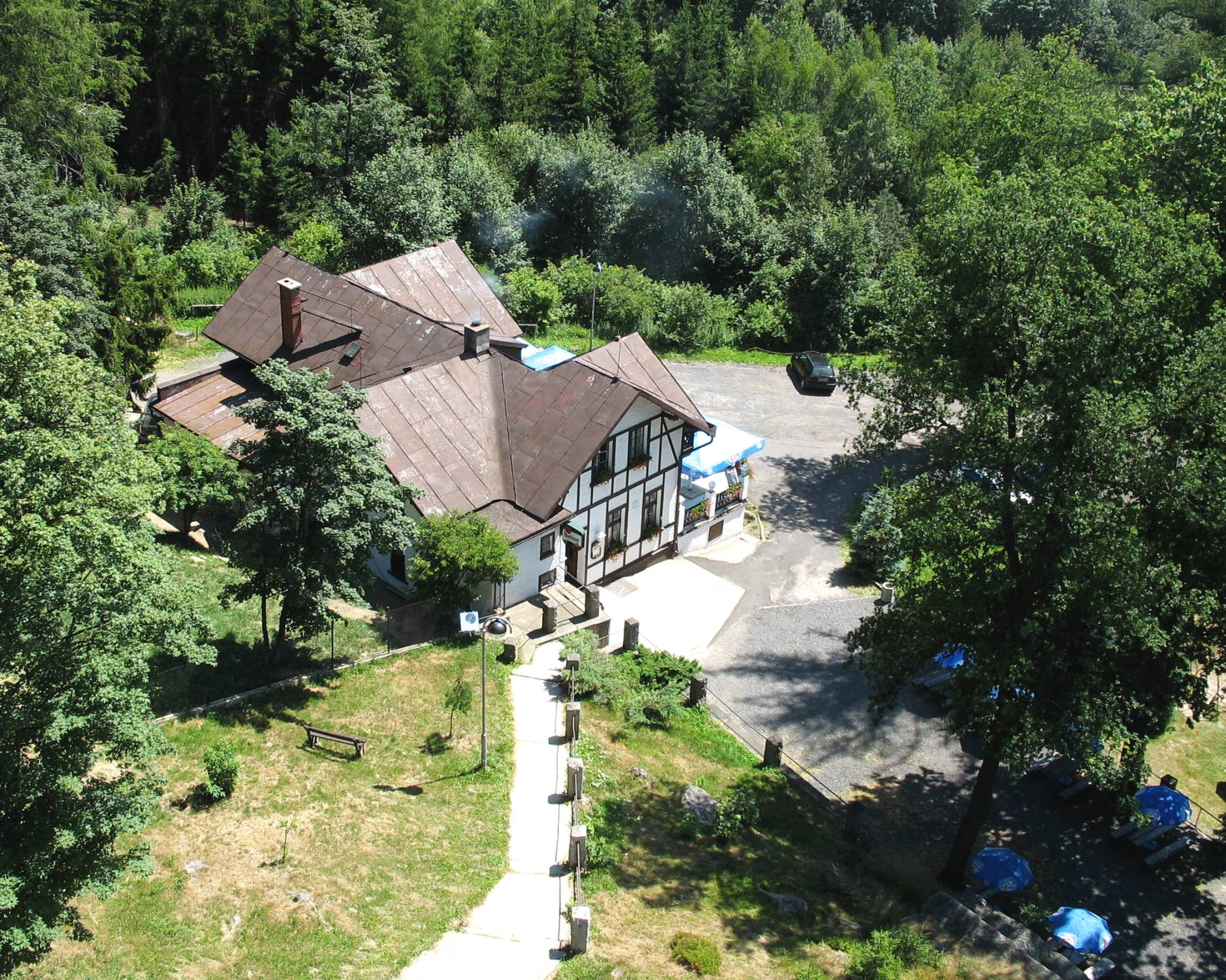
Mountain hut on the top of Háj in 2006

For a long time the Háj was bare and largely unforested. In 1861 the village of Asch bought it from the Zedwitz family for 6,000 gold talers and, with the help especially of Georg Unger, later called the "Father of the Hainberg", the woods that now characterise it were planted. For the construction of a viewing tower a construction fund was created in 1874.

A 34-metre-high (112 ft) stone observation tower on the summit was built in 1902–1904. It was designed by the Dresden architect Wilhelm Kreis. The tower bore name of Otto von Bismarck until 1946, when it was renamed Háj u Aše. The tower still stands and is one of the three Bismarck towers on the territory of the Czech Republic.

In 1884 The German Alpine Club branch at Asch (now Aš) built an Alpine Club house for hikers, the Hainberghaus. The building was seized in 1945 and renamed the Horská chata Háj. The interior was burned out in 2009 and the building has fallen into decay.

== Paths to the summit ==
Departure points for a visit of the mountain are the town of Aš and the village of Podhradí. A blue signed walking trail joins both locations, running over the summit of the mountain.
