= Schönbrunn (Fichtelgebirge) =

Coordinates: 50°01′41″N 11°58′12″E

Schönbrunn (German pronunciation: [ˈʃøːnbʁʊn]) is a village in the heart of the Fichtel Mountains in Bavaria, Germany. Since 1975 it is part of the town Wunsiedel. It has about 1,400 inhabitants, including the village Furthammer. It was founded around 1200 as a small settlement near a castle. The oldest surviving building is the church, built around 1200. Schönbrunn has a number of small businesses and less than 10 farms.

In 2007 Schönbrunn won the gold medal in a beauty contest "Unser Dorf hat Zukunft - Unser Dorf soll schöner werden" for villages in Bavaria.
