= Fürstenstein (Fichtel Mountains) =

Mountain in Germany

Coordinates: 50°00′39″N 11°43′01″E

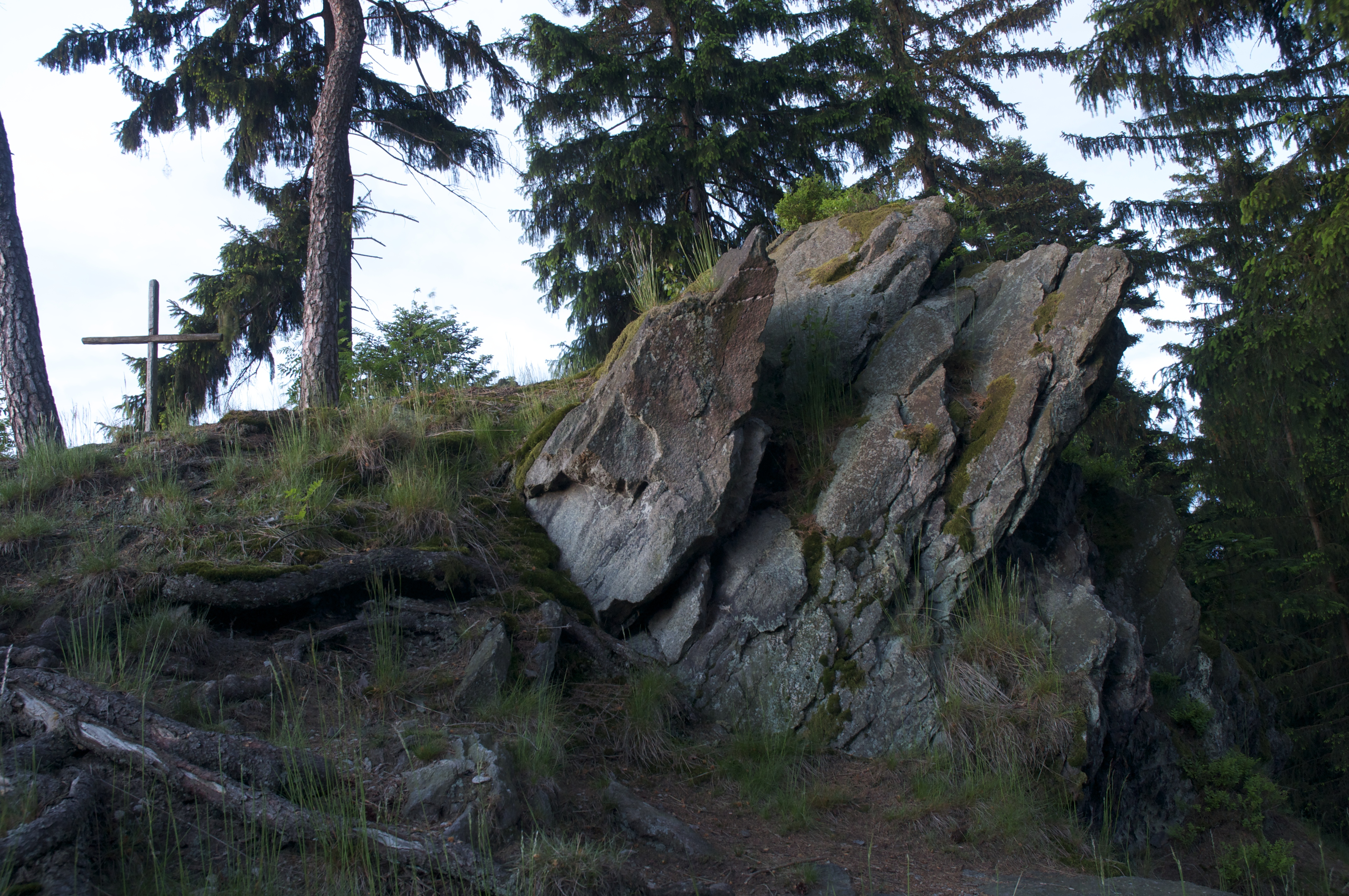
- Fürstenstein summit

Highest point
- Elevation: 675 m (2,215 ft)

Geography
- Location: Bavaria, Germany
- Parent range: Fichtel Mountains

Fürstenstein is a mountain of the Fichtel Mountains in Bavaria, Germany.
