= Röslau =

- Municipality
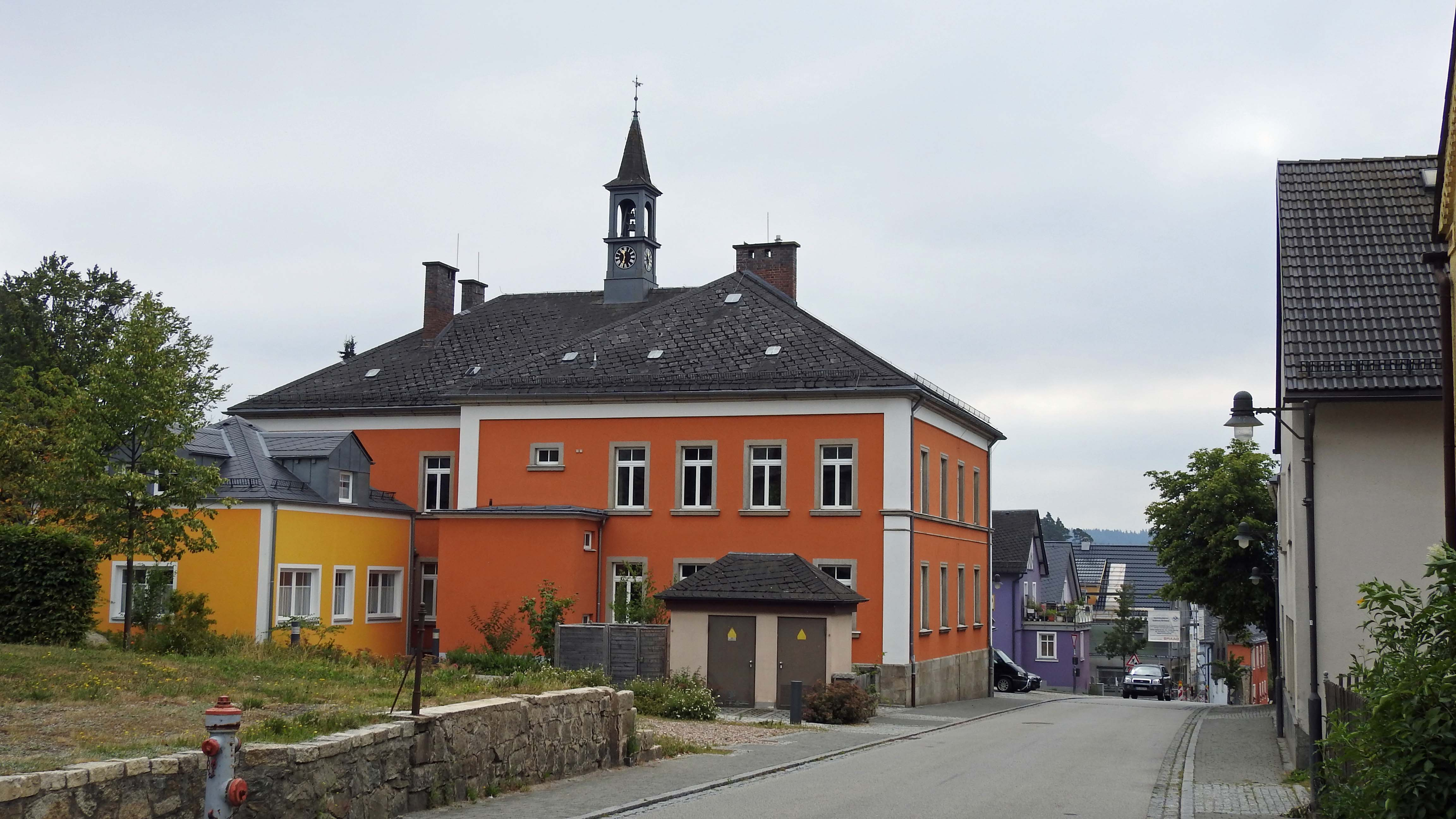
- Town hall

- Coat of arms

- Location of Röslau within Wunsiedel im Fichtelgebirge district
- Interactive map of Röslau
- Location within Germany Location within Bavaria
- Coordinates: 50°4′N 11°58′E
- Country: Germany
- State: Bavaria
- Admin. region: Oberfranken
- District: Wunsiedel im Fichtelgebirge

Government
  - Mayor (2024–30): Heiko Tröger (CSU)

Area
  - Total: 29.83 km^{2} (11.52 sq mi)
- Elevation: 571 m (1,873 ft)

Population (2025-12-31)
  - Total: 1,927
  - Density: 64.60/km^{2} (167.3/sq mi)
- Time zone: UTC+01:00 (CET)
  - Summer (DST): UTC+02:00 (CEST)
- Postal codes: 95195
- Dialling codes: 09238
- Vehicle registration: WUN
- Website: www.roeslau.de

Röslau is a municipality in the district of Wunsiedel in Bavaria in Germany.
