= Mehlmeisel =

- Municipality
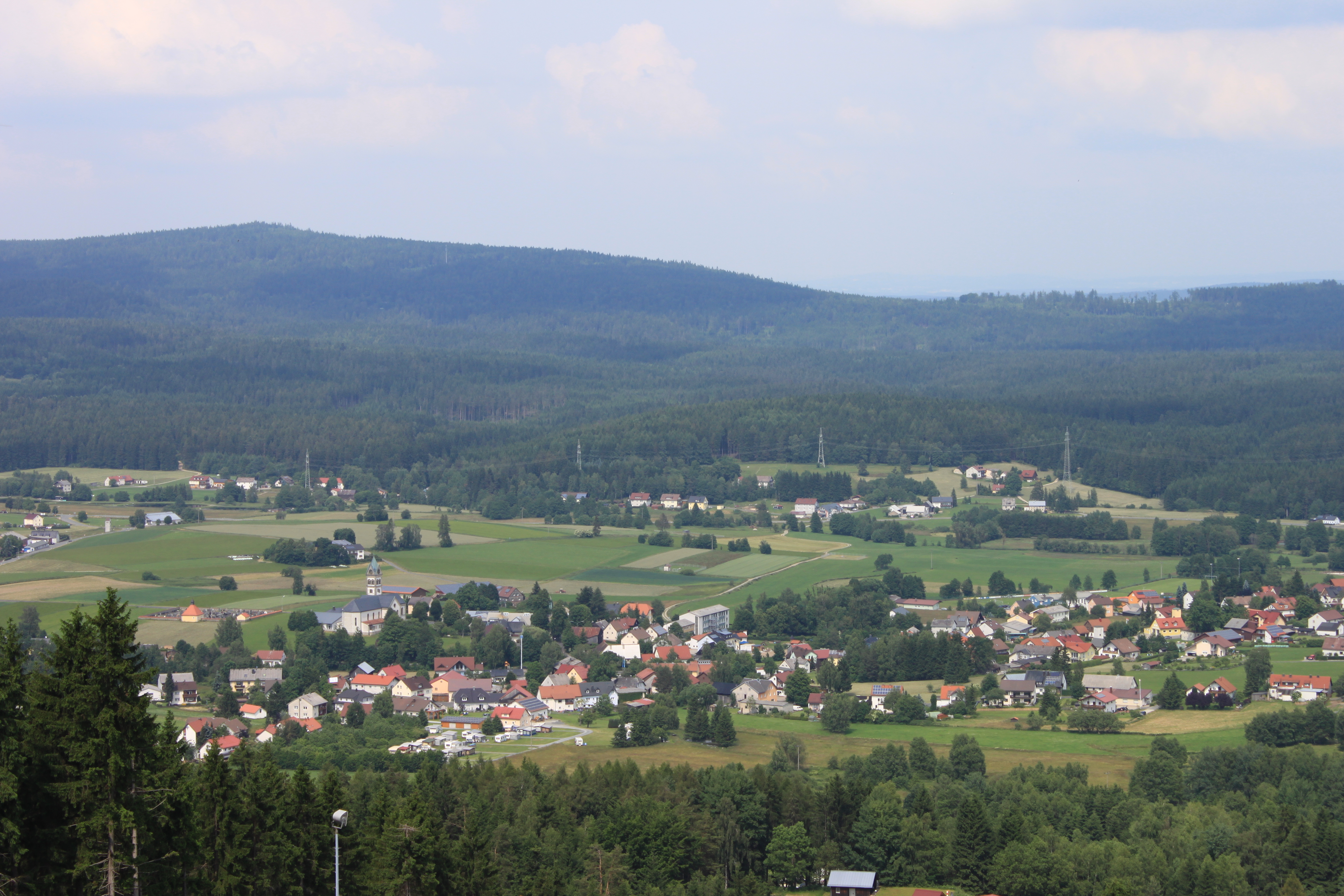
- Panorama of the village

- Coat of arms

- Location of Mehlmeisel within Bayreuth district
- Interactive map of Mehlmeisel
- Location within Germany Location within Bavaria
- Coordinates: 49°58′34.32″N 11°51′17.92″E
- Country: Germany
- State: Bavaria
- Admin. region: Oberfranken
- District: Bayreuth

Government
  - Mayor (2020–26): Franz Tauber (FW)

Area
  - Total: 13.23 km^{2} (5.11 sq mi)
- Elevation: 621 m (2,037 ft)

Population (2025-12-31)
  - Total: 1,256
  - Density: 94.94/km^{2} (245.9/sq mi)
- Time zone: UTC+01:00 (CET)
  - Summer (DST): UTC+02:00 (CEST)
- Postal codes: 95694
- Dialling codes: 09272
- Vehicle registration: BT
- Website: www.mehlmeisel.de

Mehlmeisel is a municipality in the district of Bayreuth in Bavaria in Germany.
