= Arzberg, Bavaria =

Arzberg
- Town
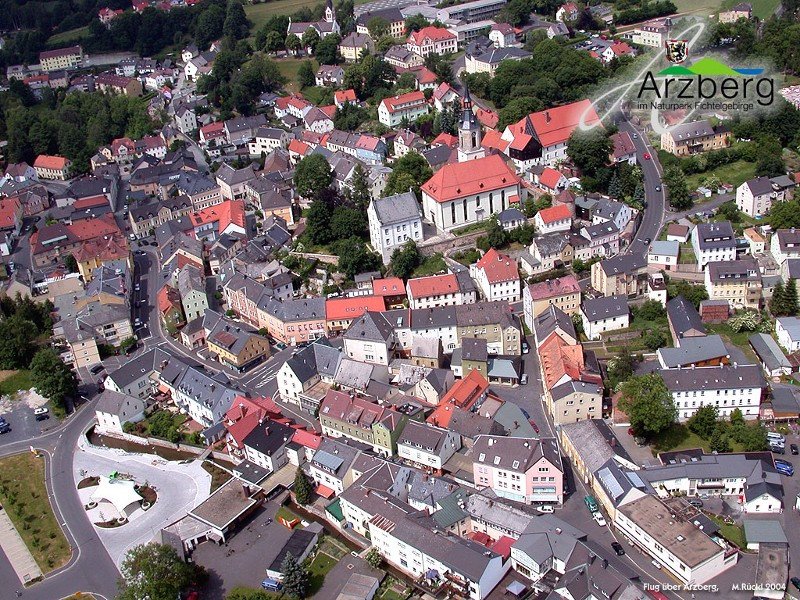
- Aerial view

- Coat of arms

- Location of Arzberg within Wunsiedel im Fichtelgebirge district
- Interactive map of Arzberg
- Location within Germany Location within Bavaria
- Coordinates: 50°4′N 12°11′E
- Country: Germany
- State: Bavaria
- Admin. region: Oberfranken
- District: Wunsiedel im Fichtelgebirge

Government
  - Mayor (2020–26): Stefan Göcking (SPD)

Area
  - Total: 43.19 km^{2} (16.68 sq mi)
- Elevation: 481 m (1,578 ft)

Population (2025-12-31)
  - Total: 4,844
  - Density: 112.2/km^{2} (290.5/sq mi)
- Time zone: UTC+01:00 (CET)
  - Summer (DST): UTC+02:00 (CEST)
- Postal codes: 95659
- Dialling codes: 09233
- Vehicle registration: WUN
- Website: www.arzberg.de

Arzberg (German pronunciation: [ˈaʁtsbɛʁk]) is a town in the district of Wunsiedel, in Bavaria, Germany. It is situated 13 km west of Cheb and 10 km northeast of Marktredwitz.

== History ==
=== 19th century ===
Porcelain was the driving force of the industrialisation in this region, since C. M. Hutschenreuther had discovered kaolin somewhat north of Arzberg and set up his production in Hohenberg an der Eger.

In 1838, Lorenz Christoph Äcker asked for the permission to establish a first Porcellain-Fabrique in Arzberg which changed hands some times until, in 1884, it was acquired by Carl Auvera (1856-1914), a grandson of C. M. Hutschenreuther, and finally by the C. M. Hutschenreuther AG, in 1919.

In 1876, Heinrich Schumann established the second one, inherited by his son Carl Schumann.

In 1887, Christoph Schumann (1864-1916), Heinrich's younger son, founded a third factory, which he already in 1891 sold to Theodor Lehmann.

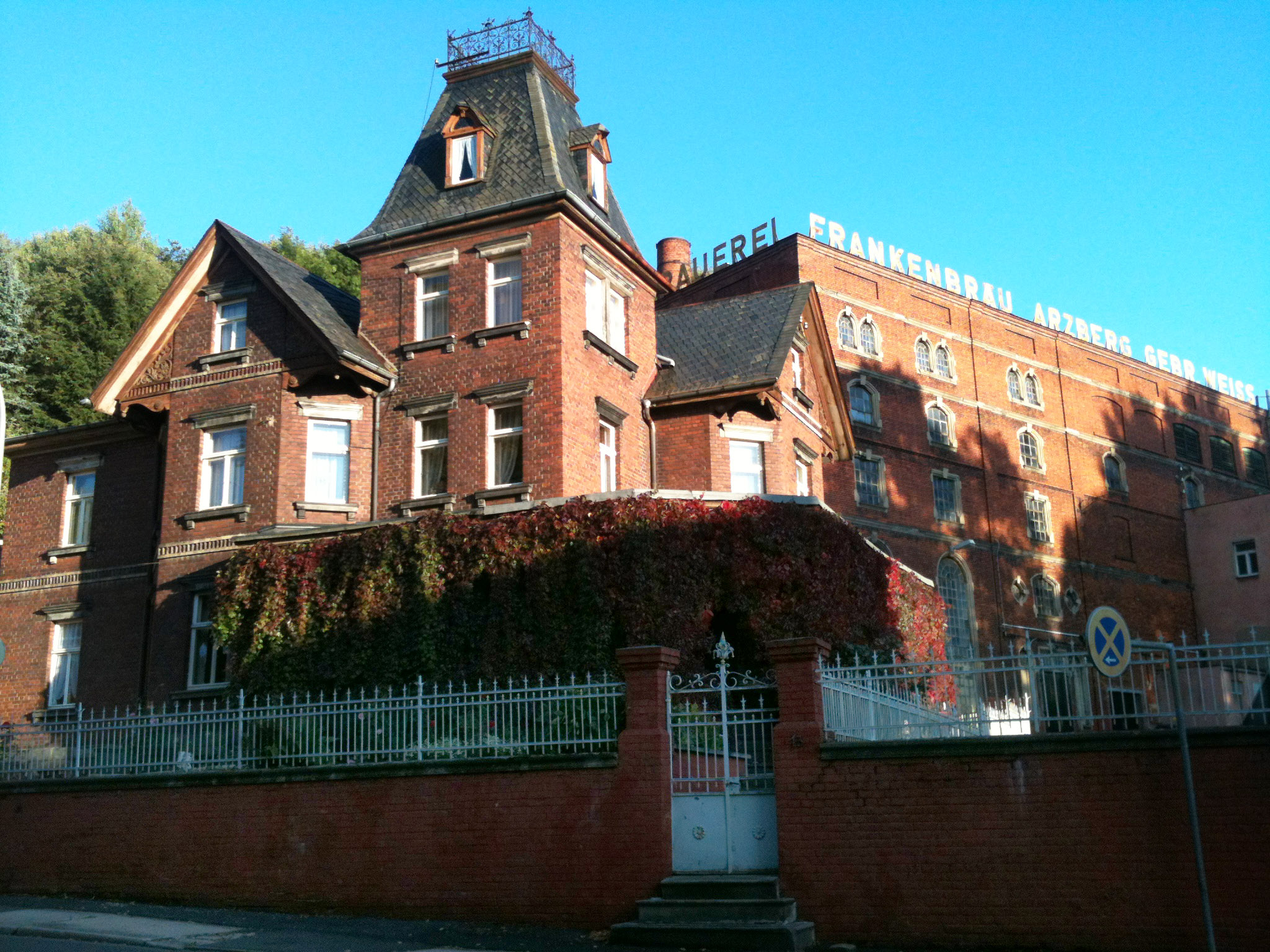
Arzberg brewery

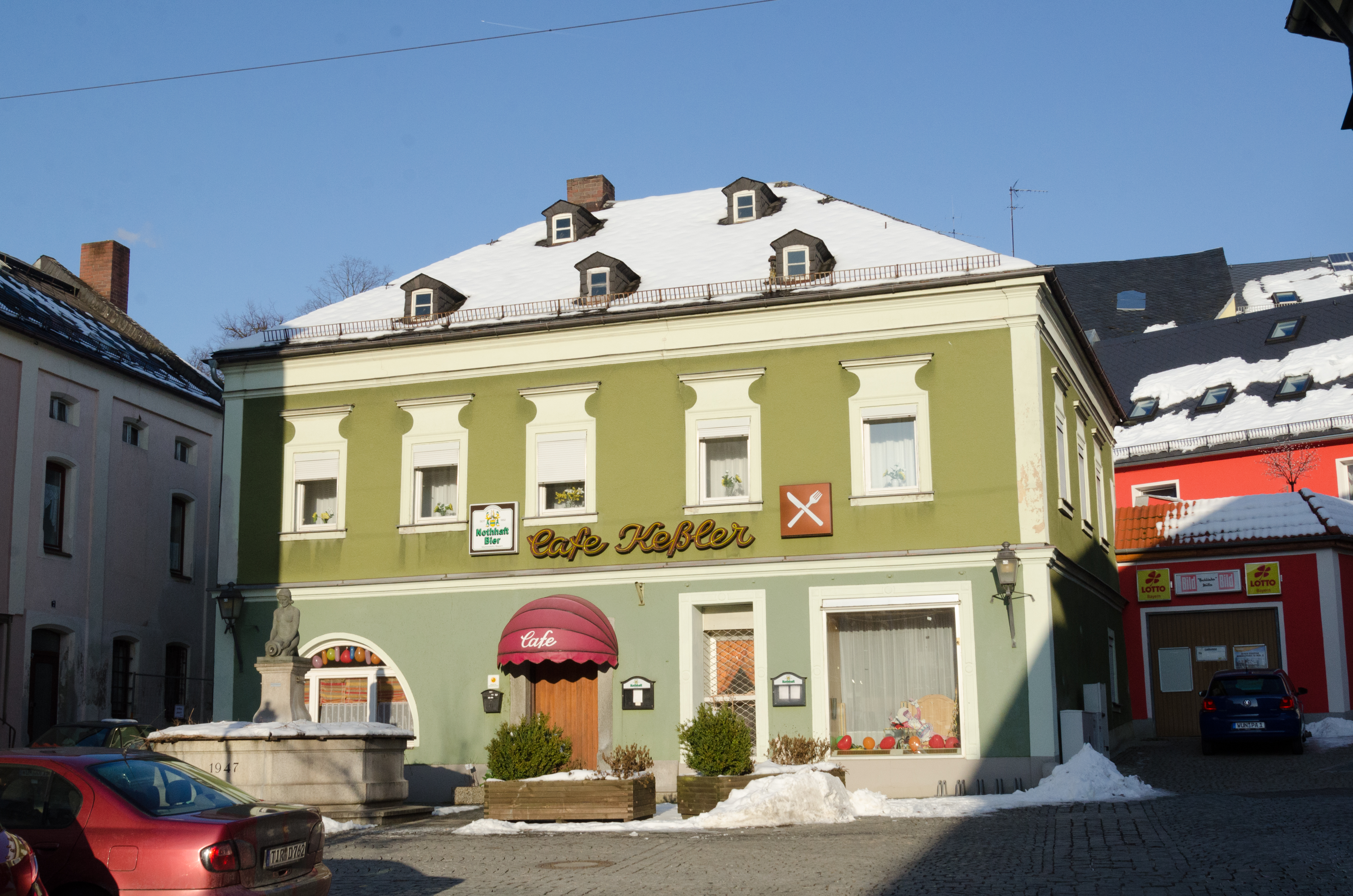
Arzberg market place

== Sister city ==
South Bend, Indiana, United States
(Austria) Arzberg, Steiermark

== Personalities ==
- Johann Arzberger (1778-1835), technician and scientist
- Ewald Drechsel (1926-1990), politician (SPD), mayor and member of parliament
