= Nagel (Fichtelgebirge) =

- Municipality
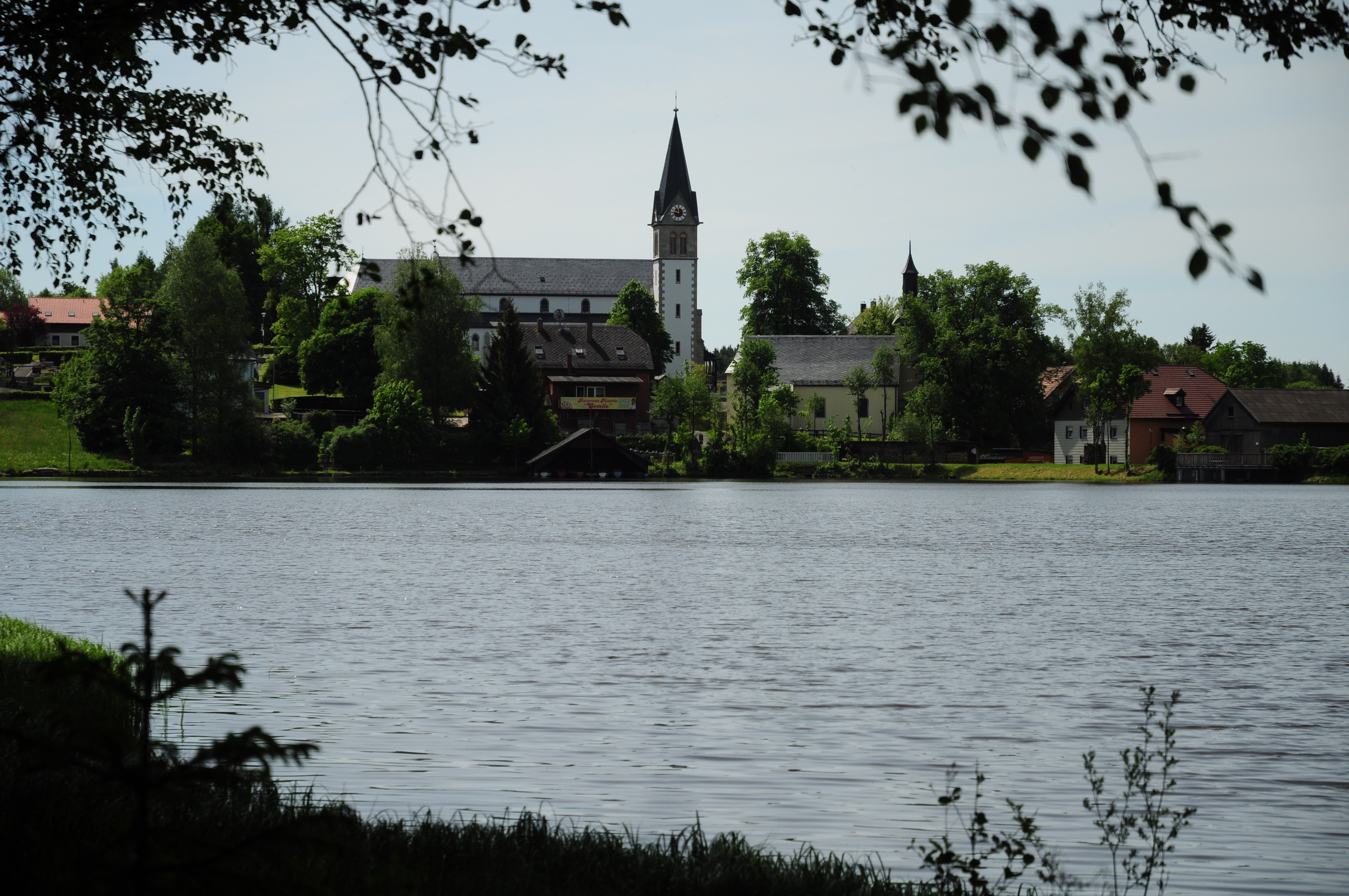
- View of Nagel over the Nagel Lake

- Coat of arms

- Location of Nagel within Wunsiedel im Fichtelgebirge district
- Interactive map of Nagel
- Location within Germany Location within Bavaria
- Coordinates: 49°59′N 11°55′E
- Country: Germany
- State: Bavaria
- Admin. region: Oberfranken
- District: Wunsiedel im Fichtelgebirge
- Municipal assoc.: Tröstau
- Subdivisions: 7 Ortsteile

Government
  - Mayor (2020–26): Helmut Voit (CSU)

Area
  - Total: 7.78 km^{2} (3.00 sq mi)
- Elevation: 580 m (1,900 ft)

Population (2025-12-31)
  - Total: 1,629
  - Density: 209/km^{2} (542/sq mi)
- Time zone: UTC+01:00 (CET)
  - Summer (DST): UTC+02:00 (CEST)
- Postal codes: 95697
- Dialling codes: 09236
- Vehicle registration: WUN
- Website: www.erholungsort-nagel.de

Nagel (German pronunciation: [ˈnaːɡl̩]) is a municipality in the district of Wunsiedel in Bavaria in Germany.
