= Fichtelgebirge Club =

Hiking club

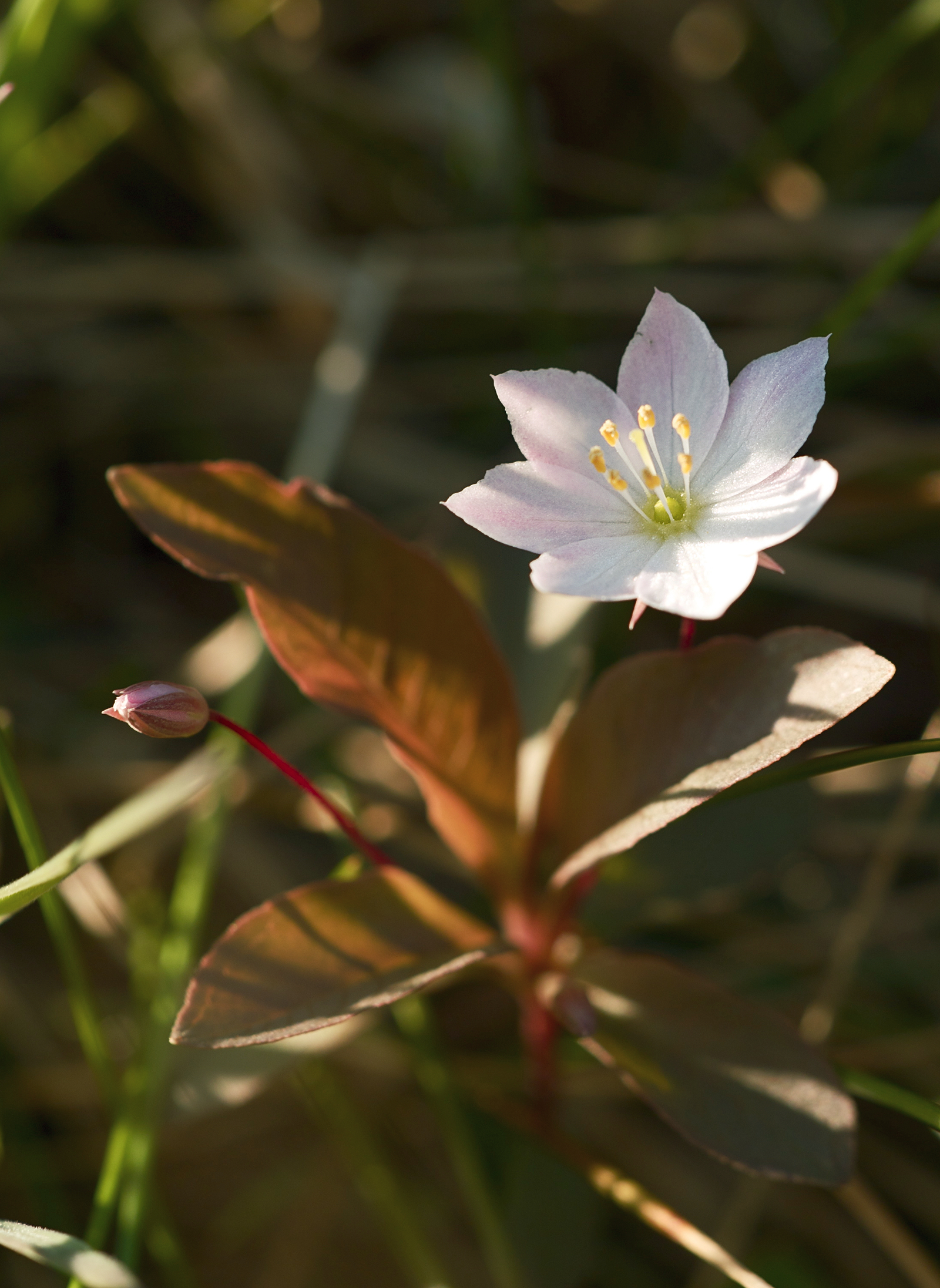
An Arctic starflower, emblem of the Fichtelgebirge Club

The Fichtelgebirge Club (German: Fichtelgebirgsverein or FGV) is a large walking club and local heritage society in Bavaria and recognised conservation group with 20,000 members in 55 local groups. As the name says, its main sphere of activity is in the Fichtel Mountains in north Bavaria. Its emblem is the Arctic starflower (the Siebenstern).

== Club aims ==
The aims of the club are the fostering of hiking, training of hiking guides, marking of footpaths, construction and maintenance of rock climbing facilities, observation towers and accommodation facilities, conservation work and support, landscape conservation, support of local culture, monument protection, running the Fichtelgebirge Museum and other local history and natural history collections, publication of the club magazine Der Siebenstern and other heritage publications, youth work and youth support.

== History ==
In 1878 the Fichtel Mountains Section (Sektion Fichtelgebirg) of the German and Austrian Alpine Club was founded in Wunsiedel. From the outset it focussed only on the development of the Fichtel Mountains. In 1888 the section was disbanded and the FGV founded with its headquarters in Wunsiedel. For a long time it was headed by the master forester (Forstmeister) of Wunsiedel. Over the course of time branches were formed in the surrounding villages and around the turn of the 20th century membership numbers had risen to 1000.
The club enjoyed encouraging growth Aufschwung after the First World War, in 1924 it had 38 local branches with 7000 members. After the Second World War, which had brought the club's activities to a standstill, it underwent a rapid regeneration which saw the foundation of numerous youth groups. In 1936 the headquarters of the club moved to Hof; it returned to Wunsiedel in 2003/04.

== Headquarters ==
The club headquarters is at Theresienstraße 2, 95632 Wunsiedel in the Haus des Fichtelgebirgsvereins (near the market place and town hall). There is a service centre that offers advice and guidance about hiking, paths, conservation, culture and local history. There is also a specialist regional library, shop, conference and exhibition rooms.

== Local branches ==
The club has branches in the following places: Arzberg, Asch (CZ), Bad Alexandersbad, Bad Berneck, Bayreuth, Berlin, Bischofsgrün, Brand/Opf., Ebnath, Fichtelberg, Franken, Gefrees, Goldkronach, Grafenreuth, Hallerstein, Hof/Saale, Hohenberg an der Eger, Kemnath, Kirchenlamitz, Kulmbach, Marktleuthen, Marktredwitz, Mehlmeisel, Münchberg, Nagel, Nemmersdorf, Neusorg, Niederlamitz, Nuremberg, Oberkotzau, Oberwarmensteinach, Pegnitz, Plauen, Pullenreuth, Rehau, Röslau, Schirnding, Schönwald, Schwarzenbach (Saale), Schwarzenhammer, Selb-Stadt, Selb-Plößberg, Sparneck, Speichersdorf, Thiersheim, Thierstein, Tröstau, Vordorf, Waldershof, Warmensteinach, Weidenberg, Weißenstadt, Weißenstein-Verein, Wunsiedel, Zell im Fichtelgebirge.

== Facilities ==
=== Accommodation ===
- Kösseinehaus
- Seehaus
- Waldsteinhaus
- Ochsenkopfhaus
- Asenturm-Tagesgaststätte
- Marktredwitzer Haus
- Gänskopfhütte
- Tauritzmühle
- Vordorfer Haus
- Marktleuthener Haus
- Weißensteinhaus

=== Observation towers ===
- Schönburgwarte on the Großer Kornberg
- Kösseine Tower
- Asenturm on the Ochsenkopf
- Waldenfelswarte on the Kohlberg near Arzberg
- Prinz Rupprecht Tower near Bad Berneck

=== Rock climbing sites ===
- Arnsteinfels
- Hirschstein
- Großer Haberstein near the Luisenburg
- Prinzenfelsen
- Nußhardtfelsen
- Rudolfstein
- Weißmainfelsen
- Wetzsteinfelsen
- Lug ins Land
- Schüssel on dem Waldstein
- Hoher Stein
- Hügelfelsen
- Katzentrögel (abandoned in 2007)
- Saubadfelsen
- Reiseneggerfelsen

== Marked footpaths: 4,110 km ==
=== FGV main footpaths ===
- Franconian Mountain Way (Fränkische Gebirgsweg); length in the Fichtel Mountains 260 km
- West Way (Westweg, white "W" on red background), length c. 76 km
  - Münchberg – Weißenstein (near Stammbach) – Gefrees – Stein – Bad Berneck – Fürstenstein – Sophienthal – Gänskopfhütte – Haidenaabquelle – Ahornberg – Immenreuth – Kemnath – Rauher Kulm
- High Way (Höhenweg, white "H" on red background) c. 46 km
  - Schwarzenbach/Saale – Großer Waldstein – Weißenstadt – Rudolfstein – Schneeberg – Nußhardt – Seehaus – Platte – Silberhaus – Hohe Mätze – Kösseine – Haberstein – Luisenburg – Wunsiedel
- North Way (Nordweg, white "N" on red background) c. 66 km
  - Kulmbach – Fölschnitz- Wirsberg – Gefrees – Großer Waldstein – Epprechtstein – Kirchenlamitz – Hirschstein – Kornberg – Vorsuchhütte- Selb – Hirschfelder Tor
- Middle Way (Mittelweg, black "M" on yellow background) c. 68 km
  - Bayreuth – Untersteinach – Königsheide – Ochsenkopf – Weißmainquelle – Weißmainfelsen – Seehaus – Vordorfermühle – Vordorf – Zeitelmoos – Thierstein – Hohenberg/Eger
- South Way (Südweg, black "S" on yellow background) c. 68 km
  - Wirsberg – Neuenmarkt – Bad Berneck – Goldmühl – Warmensteinach – Bayreuther Haus – Immenreuth – Armesberg – Friedenfels – Wiesau
- East Way (Ostweg, white "O" on red background) c. 57 km
  - Tripoint (Dreiländereck) – branch to Rehau – Rehau – Wildenau – Wartberg – Großer Hengstberg – Hohenberg/Eger – Schirnding – Kappel – Waldsassen
  - Steinwald Way (Steinwaldweg, white and red bars) c. 38 km
  - Kösseinegipfel – Langentheilen – Katzentrögel/Platte – Weißenstein – Teichelberg – Waldsassen
- Springs Way (Quellenweg, black "Q" on yellow background) c. 46 km
  - Münchberg – Zell – source of the Saxon Saale – Eger source – Weißenhaider Eck -Karches – White Main source – Weißmainfelsen – Fichtelnaab source – Fichtelsee – Nagel – Luisenburg – Alexandersbad – Marktredwitz
- Eger Way (Egerweg, black "E" on yellow background) c. 43 km
  - Egerquelle – Weißenstadt – Röslau – Marktleuthen – Schwarzenhammer – Wellerthal – Hohenberg/ Eger – Fischern
- Röslau Way (Röslauweg, black "R" on yellow background) c. 40 km
  - Röslau source – Vordorfermühle – Leupoldsdorf – Tröstau – Wunsiedel – Lorenzreuth – Seußen – Arzberg – Schirnding – Fischen
