= Holenbrunn =

- Ortsteil of Wunsiedel
- Coat of arms
- Interactive map of Holenbrunn
- Location within Germany Location within Bavaria
- Coordinates: 50°02′53″N 12°02′11″E
- Country: Germany
- State: Bavaria
- Admin. region: Oberfranken
- District: Wunsiedel
- Town: Wunsiedel

Area
  - Total: 10.09 km^{2} (3.90 sq mi)
- Elevation: 560 m (1,840 ft)

Population (2011)
  - Total: 880
  - Density: 87/km^{2} (230/sq mi)
- Time zone: UTC+01:00 (CET)
  - Summer (DST): UTC+02:00 (CEST)
- Postal codes: 95632
- Dialling codes: 09232
- Vehicle registration: WUN

Holenbrunn is a village of 1000 inhabitants in the Fichtel Mountains. It is part of the town Wunsiedel in Upper Franconia in the state of Bavaria in Germany.

== History ==
- First mentioned around 1500
- 1818 – neighbouring villages (Hauenreuth, Holenbrunn, Juliushammer, Wintersberg and Wintersreuth) were joined to one civil parish
- 1877 – Weiden–Oberkotzau railway opened, with a station in Holenbrunn
- 1978 – amalgamation with Wunsiedel due to an administration reform

== Economy, Infrastructure ==
Production facilities for:

- Glas (according to DIN 1249)
- High-voltage insulators

also:

- Agriculture
- Div. business enterprise
- Quarry for Wunsiedel Marble
- Train station (Wunsiedel-Holenbrunn)
