= Fichtelgebirge Museum =

Museum in Bavaria, Germany

Coordinates: 50°2′20.10″N 12°0′11.85″E

The Fichtelgebirge Museum (German: Fichtelgebirgsmuseum) is a regional museum in Wunsiedel, formerly the 'capital' of the Sechsämterland and the county town (Kreisstadt) in the Fichtel Mountains of central Germany.

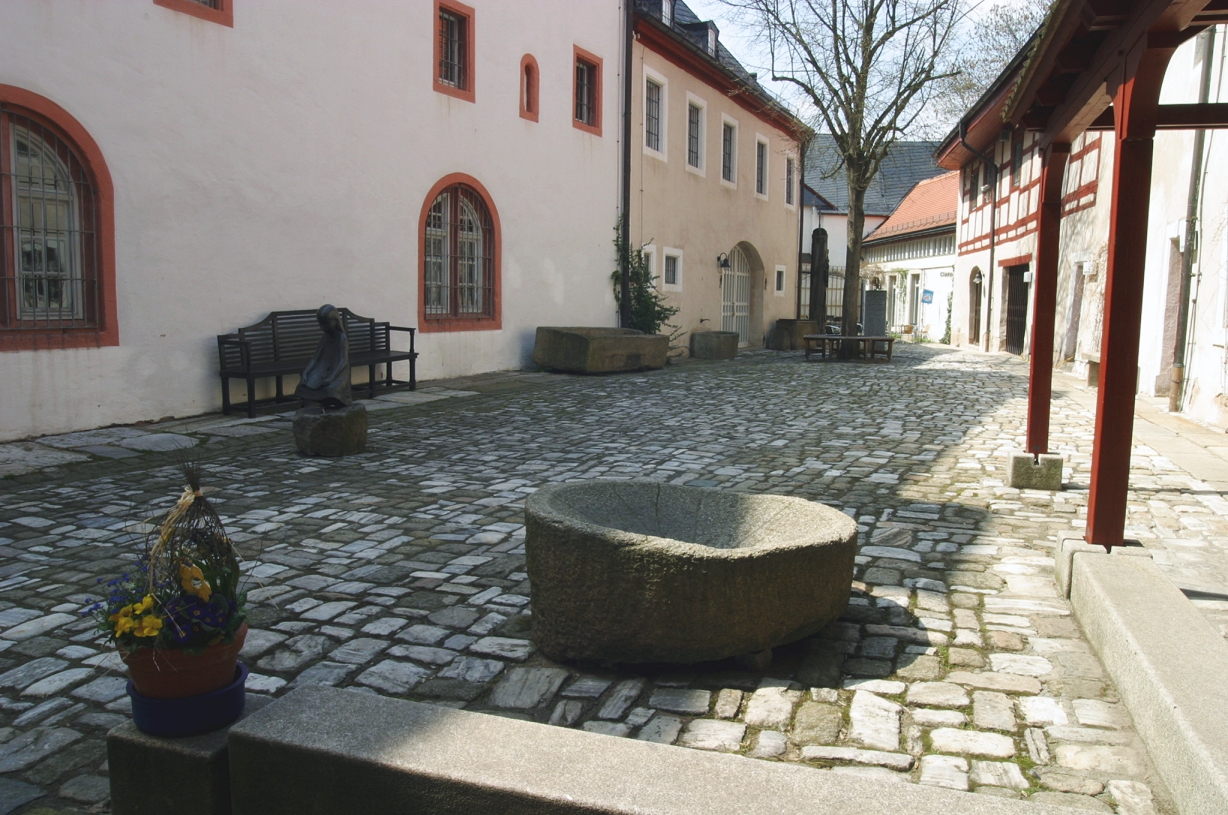
Museum inner courtyard

Formerly important trades, such as those of the whitesmith and the potter, were superseded during the 19th century by new industries. This generated a desire in the Fichtel Mountains region in 1907 to protect old trade skills and a museum was founded by the Fichtelgebirge Club. Since 1964 it has been located in a wing of the Sigmund Wann Hospital (Spital), founded in the 15th century and which acted as a nursing home. In the 1980s other hospital buildings were converted and the museum attached. In 2004 the last two houses were opened. In the first new building a 'Blue Dyeworks/Blue Printers', 'Children's World/Play World' and museum warehouse accessible to the public have been created. In the second new building is the museum library and workshops and offices. In a further nine houses the museum has well over 2500 m² of exhibition area.

The north wing houses the Prehistoric, Geology, Mineralogy and Mining departments. Its centrepiece is a mineral collection of about 2000 individual rocks and crystals, that come mainly from the Fichtel Mountains, the northern Upper Palatine Forest, the Münchberg Gneiss Massif and the Franconian Forest. In the south wing are the Regional and Cultural History departments. Of particular note is the collection of painted furniture from the 18th and 19th centuries from the Fichtel Mountains. There is also information about the author Jean Paul (1763–1825) and the political assassin Karl Ludwig Sand (1795–1820) – both born in Wunsiedel.

== Workshops ==
On the ground floor of the north wing are three workshops: a smithy, a pottery and a whitesmith's to give visitors an insight into these formerly important trades.

The blacksmith and whitesmith offer demonstrations on request or for special events, often e.g. at the Wunsiedler Brunnenfest. In the pottery by contrast, ceramics artist, Fred Zimmermann, makes pottery ware based on historic designs every Tuesday to Friday morning. He also runs a pottery in Höchstädt im Fichtelgebirge.

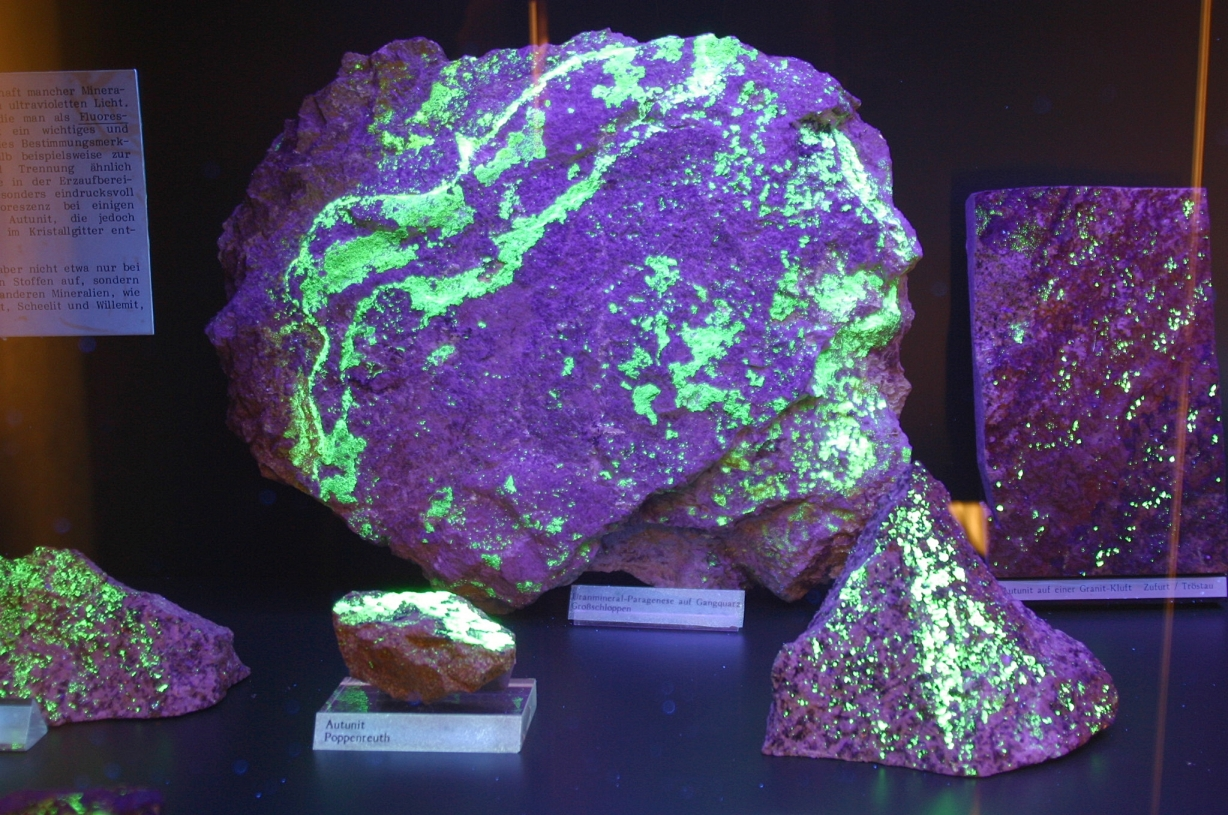
Illuminated stones

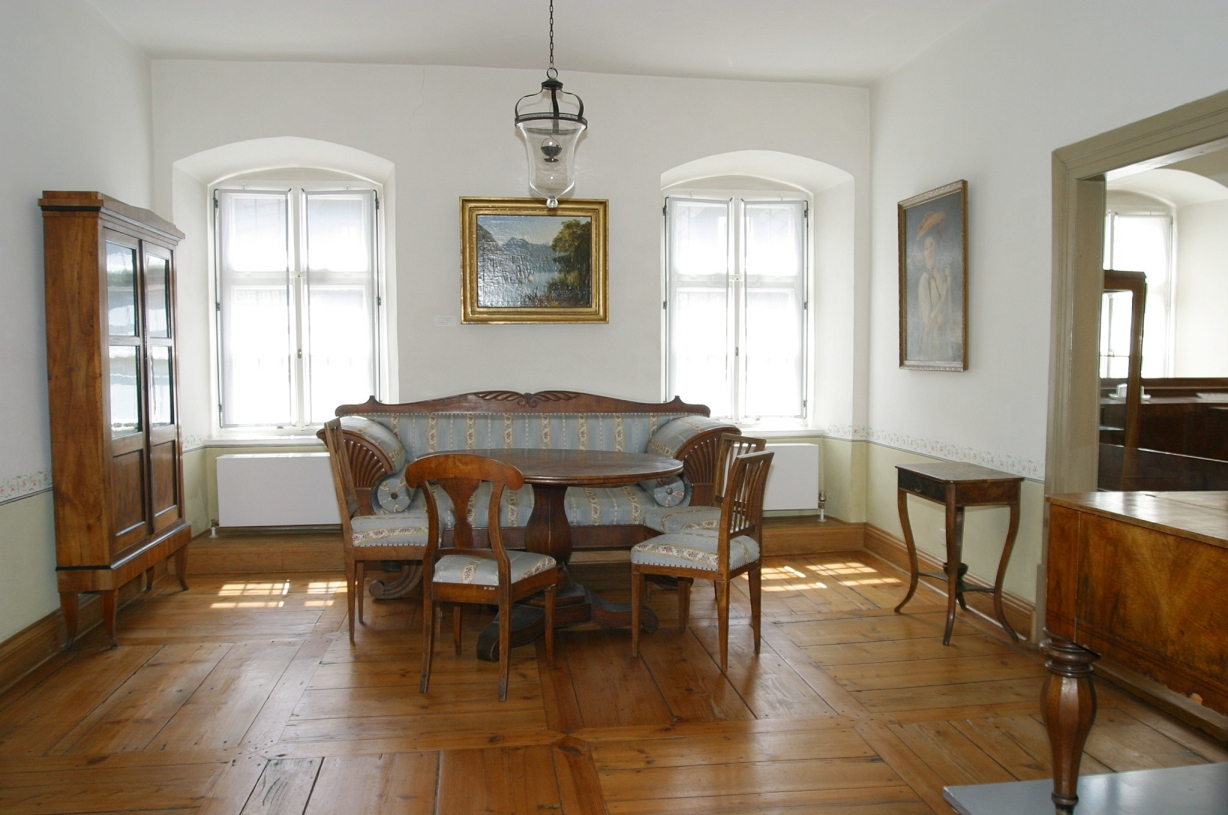
Living room

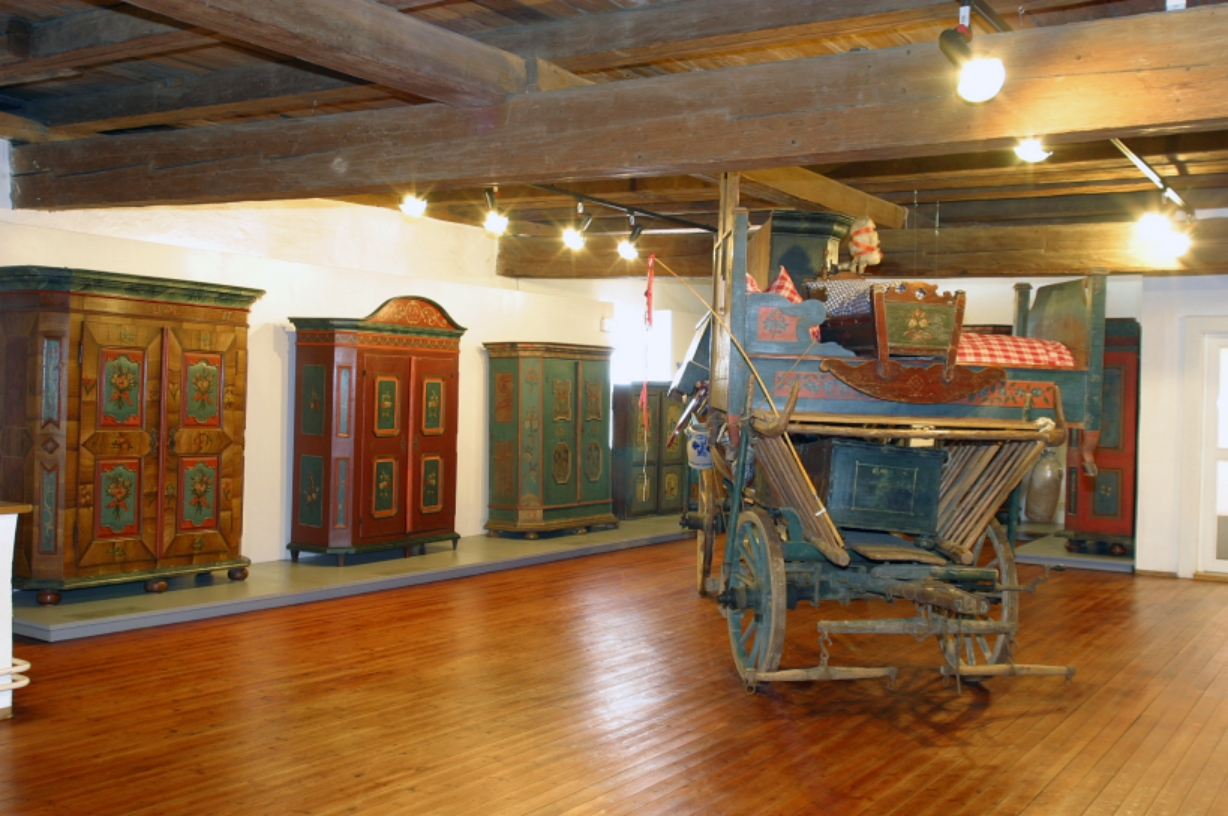
Wedding coach

== Sources ==
- Oswald A. Erich: Die deutschen Museen mit besonderer Berücksichtigung der Heimatmuseen. Bd. 1: Die Museen in Bayern. Berlin 1939
- Josef Maria Ritz: Das Fichtelgebirgsmuseum in Wunsiedel, in: Der Siebenstern 2 (1928), S. 1-12
- Zweckverband Fichtelgebirgsmuseum (Hrsg.): Begleitbuch zu den Abteilungen. Wunsiedel 1998
- Dietmar Herrmann: Aus der 100-jährigen Geschichte des Fichtelgebirgsmuseums; in: Der Siebensteern 2008, S. 3

== Films ==
Documentary "Schatztruhe Spital" about the Fichtelgebirge Museum, 15 min., 3sat (in German)
