= Wunsiedel =

- Town
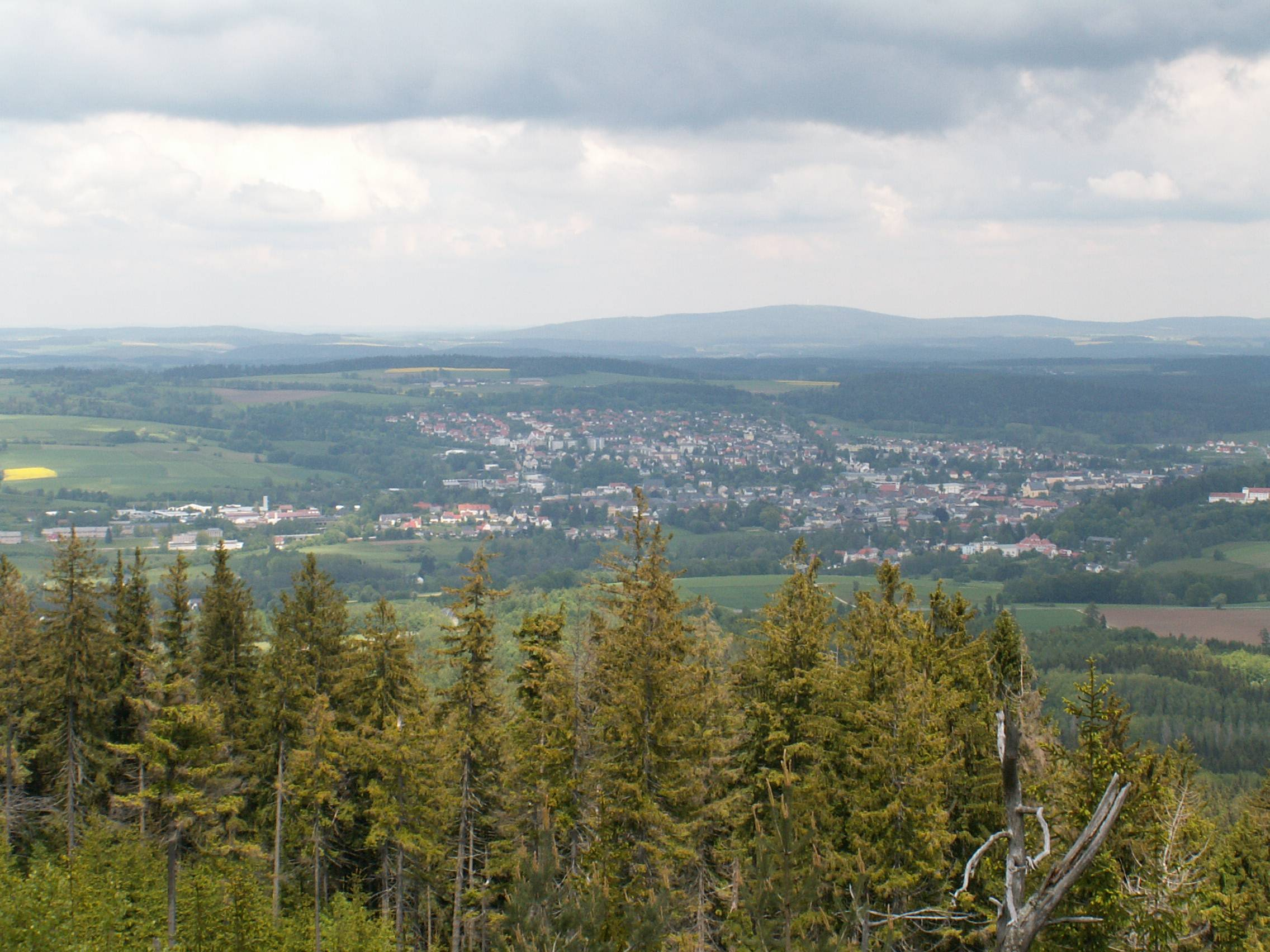
- View on the town

- Coat of arms

- Location of Wunsiedel within Wunsiedel im Fichtelgebirge district
- Interactive map of Wunsiedel
- Location within Germany Location within Bavaria
- Coordinates: 50°1′N 12°1′E
- Country: Germany
- State: Bavaria
- Admin. region: Upper Franconia
- District: Wunsiedel im Fichtelgebirge

Government
  - Mayor (2020–26): Nicolas Lahovnik (CSU)

Area
  - Total: 54.91 km^{2} (21.20 sq mi)
- Elevation: 525 m (1,722 ft)

Population (2025-12-31)
  - Total: 8,936
  - Density: 162.7/km^{2} (421.5/sq mi)
- Time zone: UTC+01:00 (CET)
  - Summer (DST): UTC+02:00 (CEST)
- Postal codes: 95632
- Dialling codes: 09232
- Vehicle registration: WUN
- Website: wunsiedel.de

Wunsiedel (German pronunciation: [ˈvʊnˌziːdl̩]; Northern Bavarian: Wåuṉsieḏl or Wousigl) is the seat of the Upper Franconian district of Wunsiedel in northeast Bavaria, Germany. The town is the birthplace of poet Jean Paul. It also became known for its annual Luisenburg Festival and the Rudolf Hess Memorial March held there by Neo-Nazis until 2005.

== Geography ==
Wunsiedel lies in the Fichtel Mountains in the valley of the Röslau at the foot of the Kösseine Plateau.

== History ==
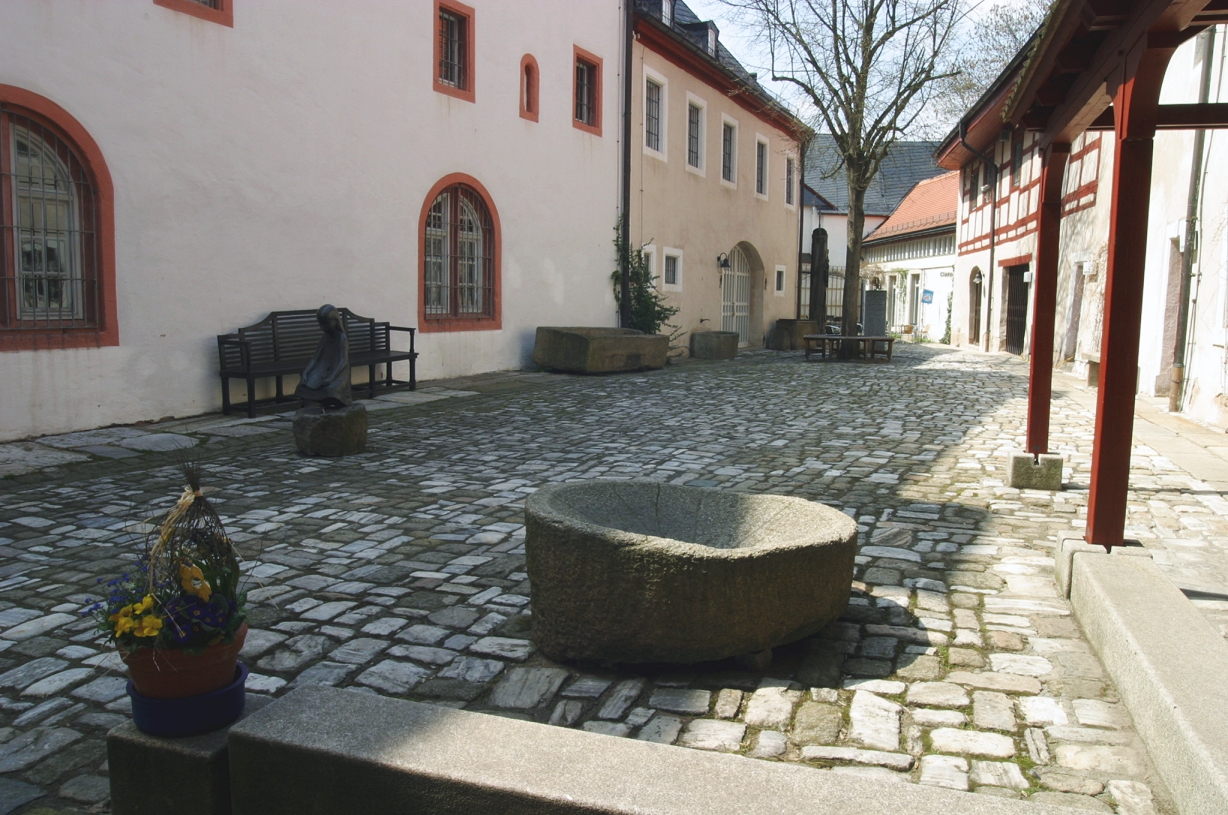
Museum in Wunsiedel

Wunsiedel was first mentioned in 1163 as the seat of a ministerialis, Adelbertus or Albert. The name probably originates from Wunne ('glades') and Sedel ('noble seat'). In 1285, Burgrave Friedrich III of Nuremberg received the fiefdom of the town from King Rudolph I of Habsburg. In 1326, Wunsiedel was given town rights by Burgrave Friedrich IV and this was confirmed in 1328 by Emperor Louis the Bavarian. In 1430 Hans of Kotzau defeated the Hussites in the Battle of Katharinenberg, a low mountain immediately south of Wunsiedel, and in 1652 Jobst of Schirnding beat the Bohemians also on the Katharinenberg.

In the Middle Ages, Wunsiedel was a centre of tin mining and achieved great economic importance through the manufacture of tin plate. In 1613, it became capital of the Sechsämterland — an area comparable in size to the modern district Wunsiedel im Fichtelgebirge. The bailiffs (Amtmänner) in Hohenberg, Weißenstadt, Kirchenlamitz, Selb and Thierstein were all subordinated to the high bailiff (Amtshauptmann) in Wunsiedel.

Wunsiedel was a part of the Hohenzollern Principality of Bayreuth until 1791/92 when the last margrave, Karl Alexander, abdicated and the region was placed under Prussian administration. It was occupied for four years by Napoleon's troops and, in 1810, became part of the Kingdom of Bavaria.

Fires in 1476, 1547, 1607, 1636, 1644, 1646, 1657 and 1731 destroyed various parts of the town. After the last major fire in 1834, which razed two-thirds of Wunsiedel, the town was rebuilt in a classicist style.

Wunsiedel Is the birthplace of the nationalist student Karl Ludwig Sand (October 5, 1795), who later went on to assassinate August von Kotzebue, a famous conservative German playwright. Kotzebue's death was a direct result of his published ridicule of the student associations in general, however focusing harshest comments on the newly formed Burschenschaften, student organizations that supported free institutions, a national German state, uncensored press. In addition, the affluent writer was appointed as Russia's "ambassador" (by Russia) making his death a certainty. In his role as ambassador, Kotzebue was accused as being a "spy" while his role as editor of a literature review magazine brought him accusation of outright plagiarism. In 1817 at the Wartburg Castle, during a gathering of students, the burning of his published works with those of other "enemies" brought him to the attention of the young Karl Sand. In retrospect, a case for post traumatic stress syndrome, as a complicating factor, could probably be made as Karl Sand witnessed, helplessly, the drowning of his good friend just months prior to the murder.

After World War II, Wunsiedel was part of the American Zone and a Fluchtlingssuchstelle was installed at the Landratsamt at the Bezirksamtstrasse 8.

=== Wunsiedel and Rudolf Hess ===
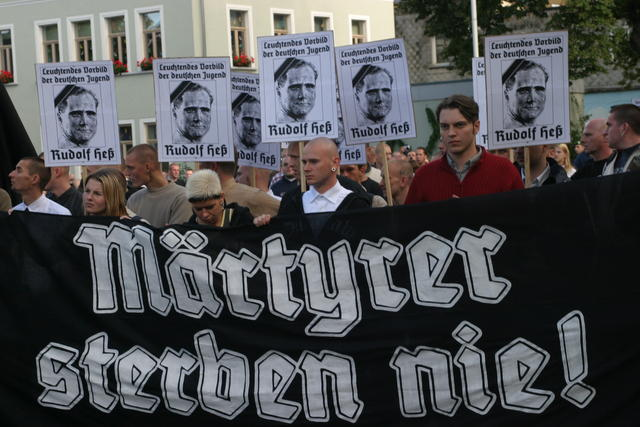
A march to commemorate Rudolf Hess, organized by Neo-Nazis, Wunsiedel, 2004. The banner Märtyrer sterben nie translates to 'Martyrs never die'.

In the late 1980s, the cemetery of Wunsiedel became rather infamous after Adolf Hitler's deputy Rudolf Hess, who had died in a Berlin prison on 17 August 1987, was buried there. In the years that followed, neo-nazi groups organized memorial marches on each 17 August. The number of participants rose from 120 in 1988 to more than 1,100 in 1990. The gatherings faced protests from anti-fascist groups. Neo-Nazi marches were banned in 1991.

Under the impression that the situation had "cooled down", the Bavarian Administrative Court permitted the gatherings again in 2001. The result was unexpected: neo-Nazi groups managed to amass more and more people, the peak being reached in 2004, when over 4,500 participants from all over Europe assembled in Wunsiedel. The anti-fascist initiative "Wunsiedel ist bunt, nicht braun" ('Wunsiedel is colourful, not brown') organised a counter-demonstration with about 800 participants, decorating the city with rainbow flags and spraying the marchers with confetti. The initiative later received the Bündnispreis for commitment and bravery awarded by the German federal ministers Otto Schily and Brigitte Zypries.

In 2005, the memorial march was banned for the first time on the basis of article 130 of the German criminal code, which outlaws incitement of the people. A complaint against the ban was rejected by the Federal Constitutional Court. Nevertheless, more than 2,500 people met on 20 August 2005, to celebrate a Day of Democracy in Wunsiedel.

The town decided to have the Hess grave removed in 2011. The family of Rudolf Hess arranged with the cemetery to have Hess’s remains exhumed, cremated and scattered at sea to deter any further pilgrimages to his grave. The gravestone with the words "Ich hab's gewagt" ('I have dared') was removed and destroyed. Smaller neo-Nazi marches continued afterward, leading the human-rights group Rechts gegen Rechts to organise a charity drive whereby a certain sum of money would be donated to the organisation Exit Deutschland, which helps neo-Nazis leave the movement, for each metre marched.

== Main sights ==
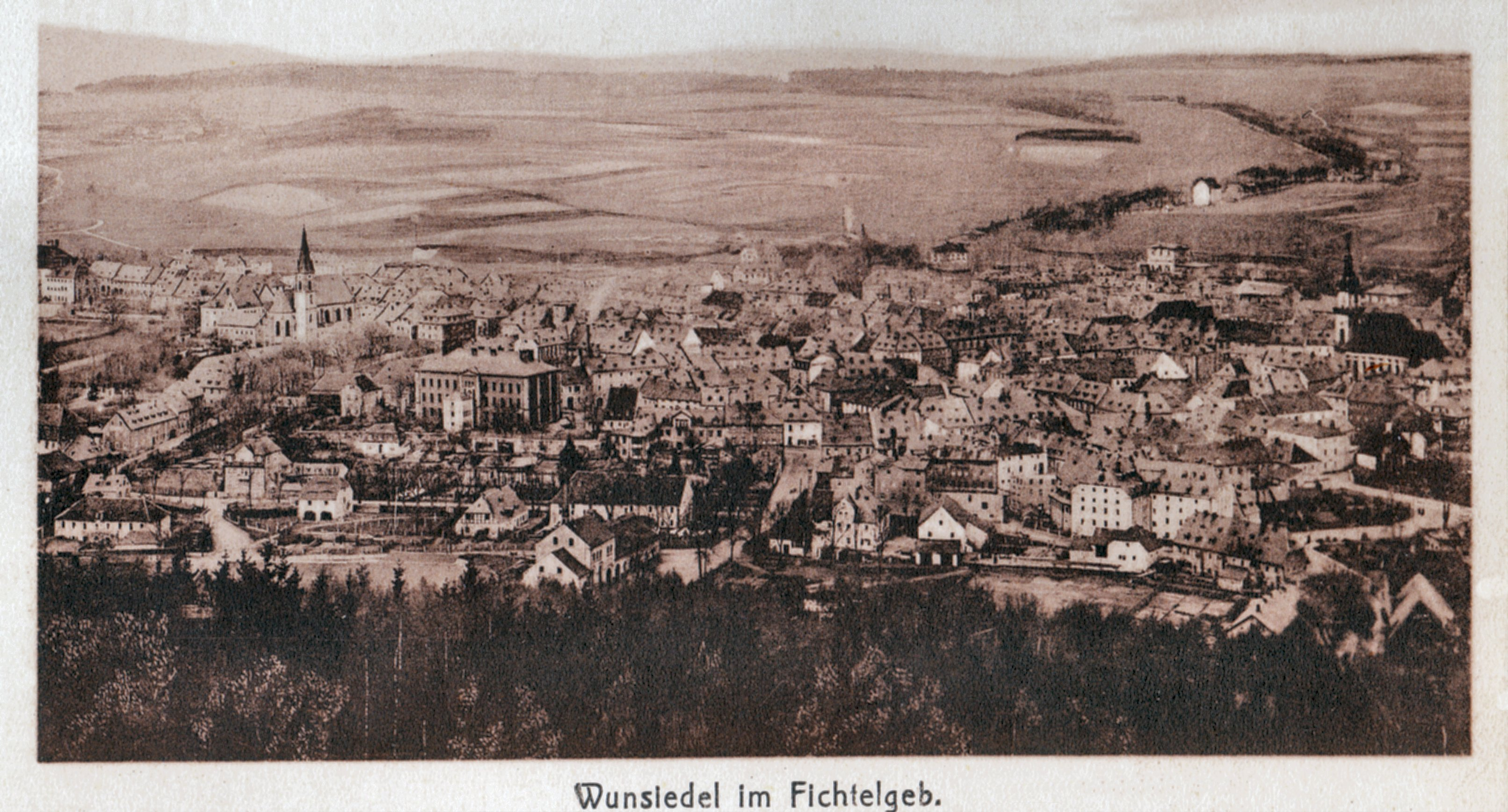
Wunsiedel (1911)

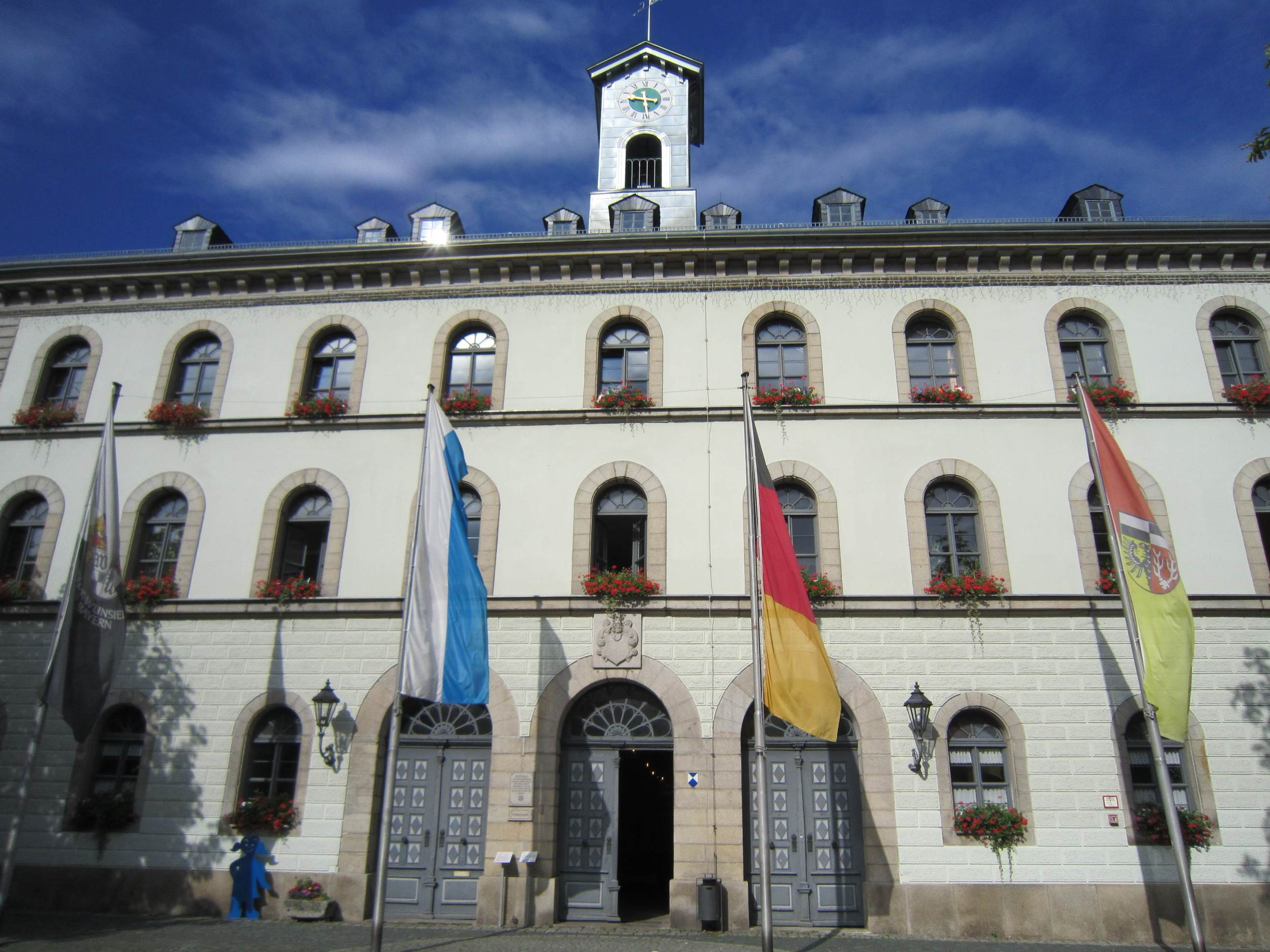
Wunsiedel Town hall

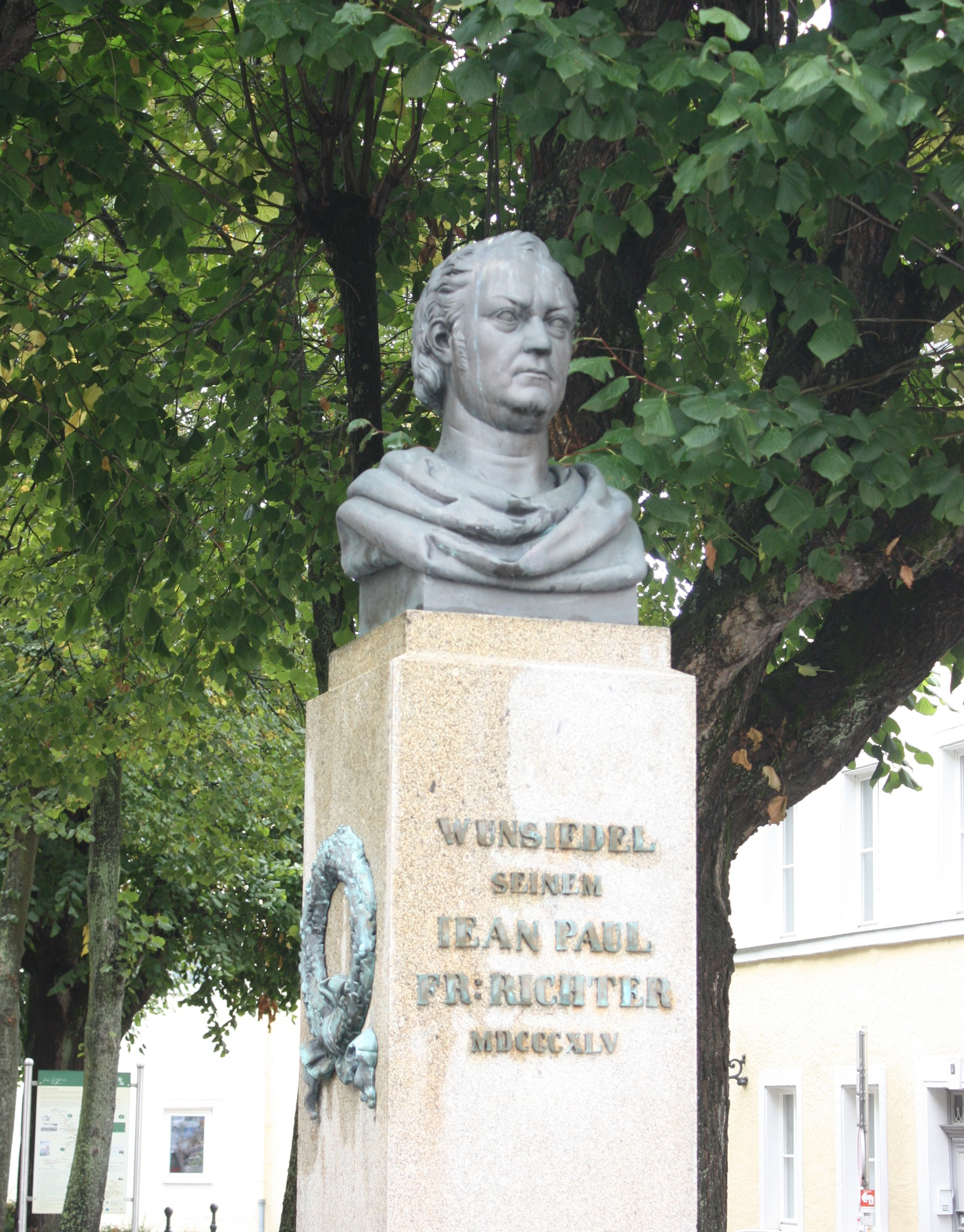
Wunsiedel, Jean Paul bust

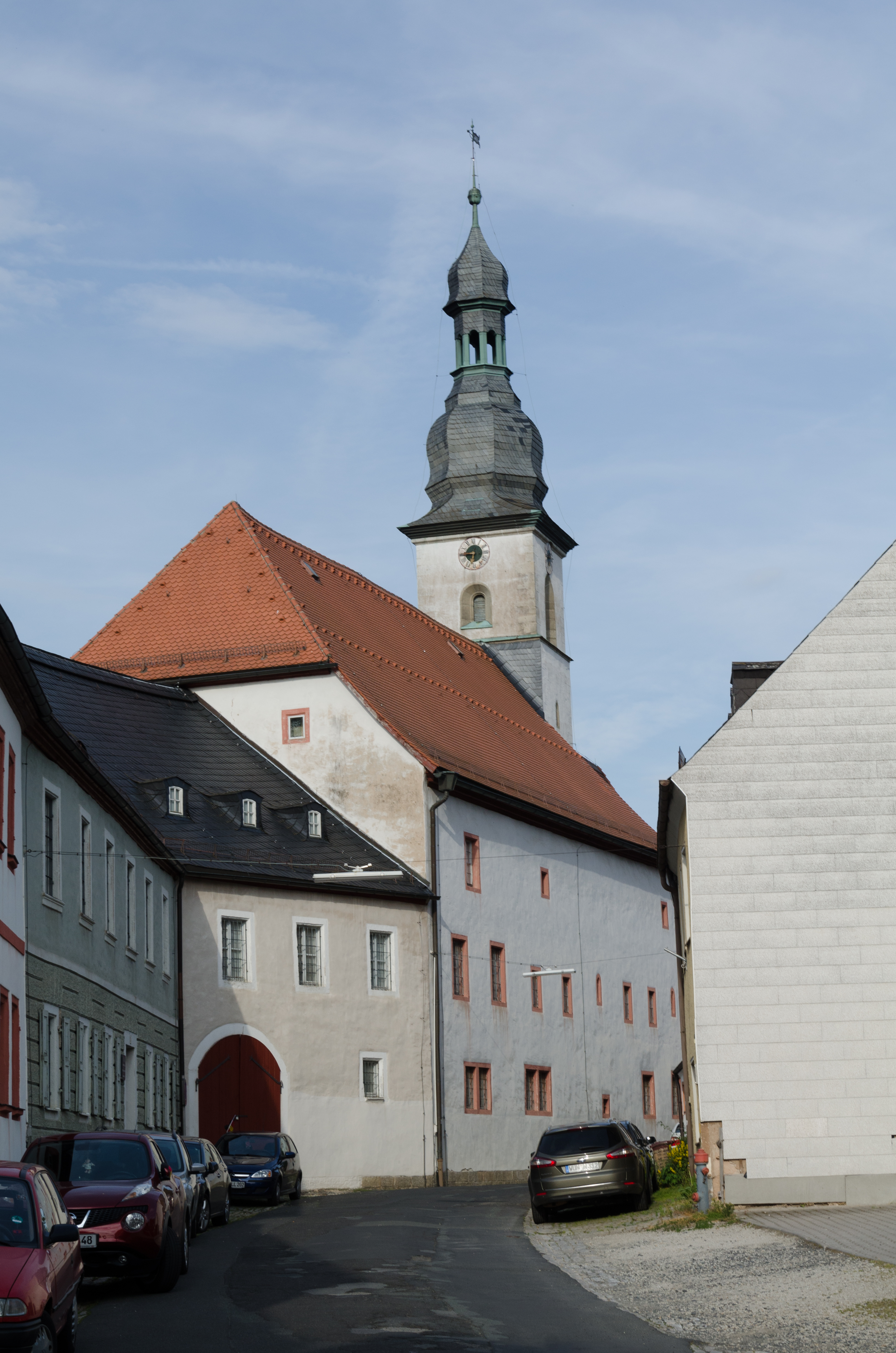
Wunsiedel Spitalkirche (spital church)

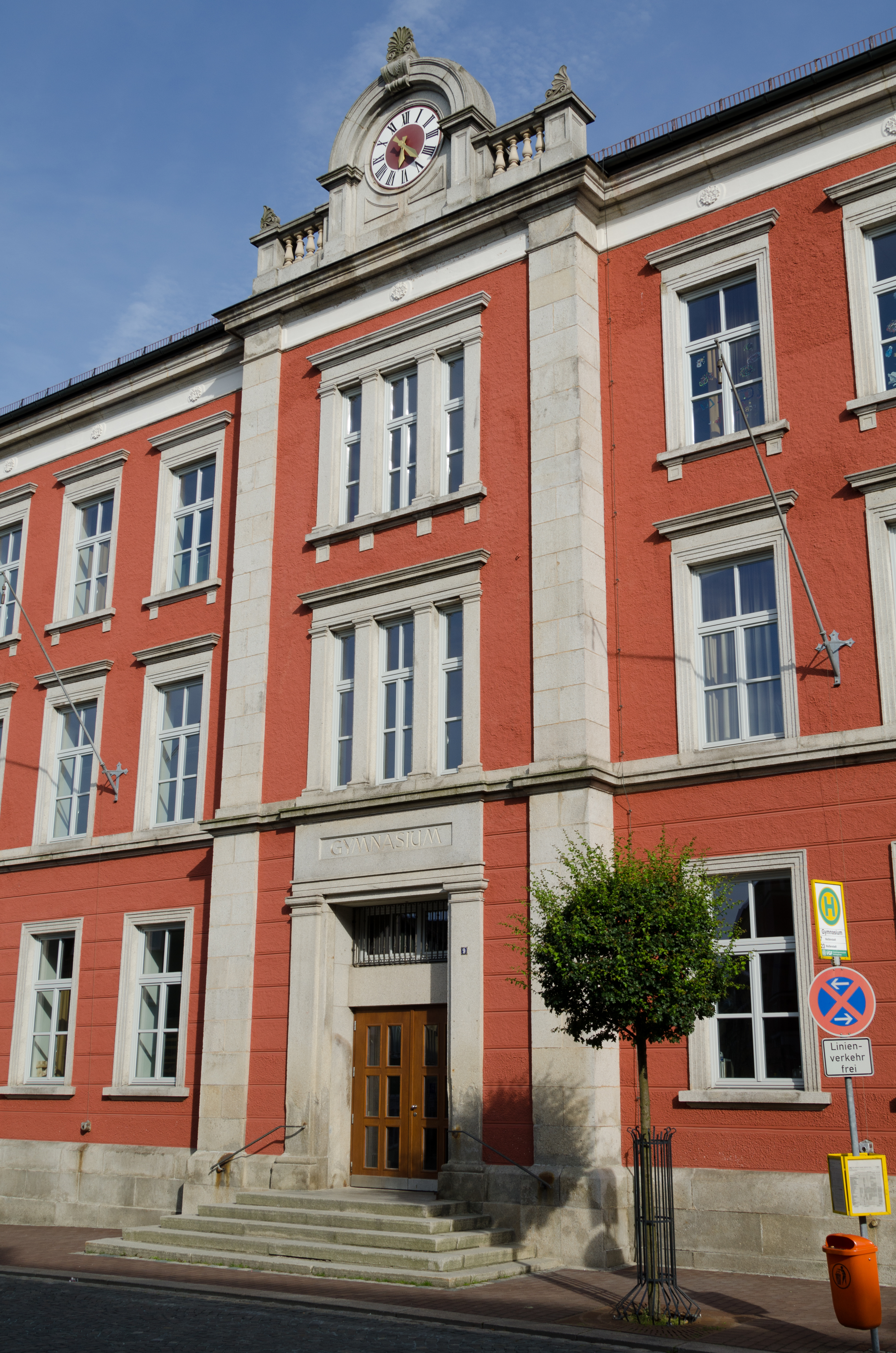
Wunsiedel

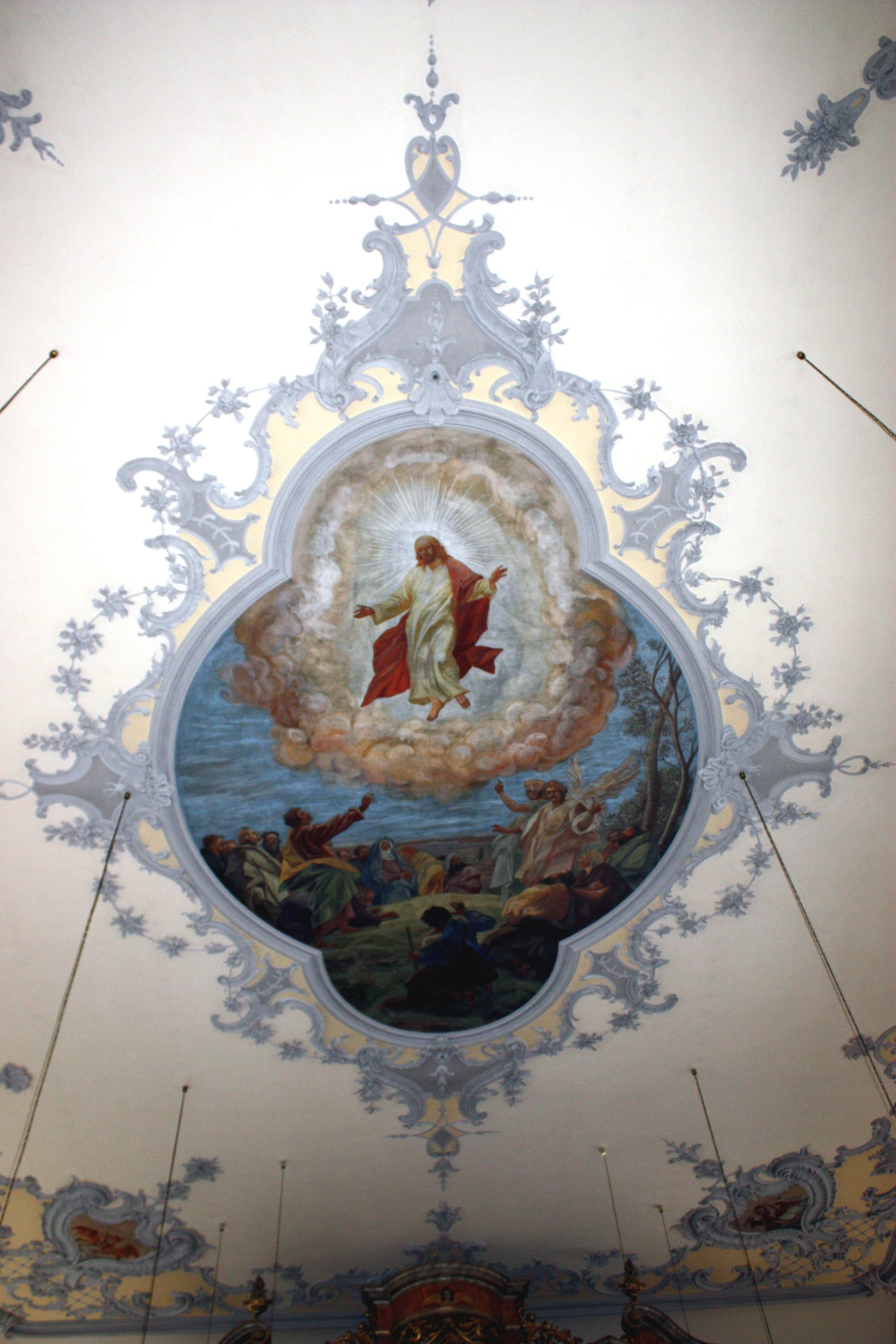
Wunsiedel, Church of St. Veit and St. Martin, Ceiling fresco

- Luisenburg Rock Labyrinth, municipal landscape garden and national geotope
- Luisenburg Festival stage on the Luisenburg (oldest natural stage in Germany)
- Katharinenberg Municipal Park
- The now empty grave of Rudolf Hess in the cemetery, major Nazi war criminal, sentenced in the Nuremberg trials.
- In the same cemetery are the individual and multiple graves of 30 Jewish concentration camp victims, who died during a death march in the last days of the Second World War in 1945
- Wunsiedel Birds of Prey Park and falconry at the Katharinenberg Municipal Park
- Lernort Natur Deer Park
- Historic town walk through the classicist old town (Altstadt)
- Jean-Paul circular walk in North Wunsiedel
- The Markus-Zahn-Allee and St. Joseph's Chapel
- Fichtelgebirge Museum, the largest Bavarian regional museum with an extensive stone and mineral collection
- German Natural Stone Archive, the largest collection of its kind in the world with 5,500 templates (Musterplatten) of natural stones from across the world
- St. Veit's Parish Church
- St. Maria Spitalkirche
- Parish Church of the Twelve Apostles
- Peace Church of the Holy Trinity
- Ruined church of St. Katharine's on the Katharinenberg, the oldest building in the town
- The Town Hall of 1835/1837
- The Koppete Gate (Koppetentor), the only surviving gate of the old town defences (erected in 1471)
- Jean Paul's birthplace (a former schoolhouse) with a bust of Jean Paul by Ludwig Schwanthaler
- Schloss Bernstein

== Government ==
=== Town council ===
Wunsiedel is governed by a mayor (Bürgermeister), currently Nicolas Lahovnik and a town council (Stadtrat) with 20 seats.

Recent results for the current city council are:

	2002	2008	2014	2020
CSU	13	11	7	8
SPD	7	5	4	3
Greens	1	1	1	2
Free Voters	–	3	2	2
Active Citizens	–	3	4	3
Coloured List	–	1	2	1
Voters Union/Free Citizens	3	–	–	–
AfD	–	–	–	1
Total	24	24	20	20

=== Incorporated villages ===
The town's borough includes the following villages (year of incorporation in brackets):

Bernstein (1978), Breitenbrunn, Furthammer, Göpfersgrün, Göringsreuth, Hauenreuth, Hildenbach (1978), Hildenmühle, Holenbrunn (1978), Johanneszeche, Juliushammer, Klause, Kösseinehaus, Krohenhammer, Luisenburg, Schneckenhammer, Schneckenmühle, Schönbrunn (1975), Sinatengrün, Stemmasgrün, Stollenmühle, Valetsberg, Walkmühle, Wiesenmühle, Wintersberg, Wintersreuth.

== Economy ==
The economy of the town of Wunsiedel is dominated by the chemical (paint works, Dronco), clothing, porcelain, glass, stonemasonry and construction industries. In addition several car dealerships have their headquarters in the town, of which Autowelt König has the most employees. Two breweries and various craft enterprises are based in Wunsiedel. One popular export product is the herb-flavoured spirit Sechsämtertropfen. Unemployment at 7.6% is well above the Bavarian average. Wunsiedel Marble is quarried locally.

== Public institutions ==
=== State institutions ===
The state institutions in Wunsiedel are the district administrative office (Landratsamt), the finance office (Finanzamt), the survey office (Vermessungsamt), the magistrate's court (Amtsgericht), the office of agriculture and forests (Amt für Landwirtschaft und Forsten), the health insurance office (AOK-Direktion), the education office (Schulamt) and a police station.

=== Educational establishments ===
- Town singing and music school
- Jean Paul School (primary and secondary modern school)
- Luisenburg Grammar School
- Sigmund Wann Middle School
- State School of Economics
- State Technical College for Stonemasonry and German Natural Stone Archive
- European Training Centre for Masonry and Stone Sculpture
- Marktredwitz-Wunsiedel State Vocational College
- State Hunting School of the Bavarian Hunting Conservation and Hunters' Association (BJV)
- Town Archive
- Town Library
- Hous of the Fichtelgebirge Club
- Wunsiedel i. Fichtelgebirge District Adult Education Centre

=== Leisure and sports facilities ===
In addition to the Fichtelgebirge Hall and Fichtelgebirge Stadium there is the town open-air swimming pool and sauna and the indoor pool. On the Katharinenberg there is a youth hostel and a youth centre, recently renovated by the town. For recreation there is the area around the Wunsiedler Eisweiher (mini-golf. ninepins, rowing boats, tennis). As well as the sports facilities belonging to clubs there are also various children's play parks. On 21 December 2009 the largest climbing wall in North Bavaria was opened in the premises of the old sugar factory (Zuckerhut).

== International relations ==
Wunsiedel is twinned with:

- Torbalı, Turkey, since 1980
- Mende, France, since 1980
- Schwarzenberg, Germany, since 1990
- Volterra, Italy, since 2006
- Ostrov, Czech Republic, since 2009

== Culture ==
Regular events held in Wunsiedel include:

- Luisenburg Festival from June to August on the oldest open-air and natural stage in Germany
- Well festival (Wunsiedler Brunnenfest) on Saturday before the 24 June (St. John's)
- Funfair on the municipal festival square from Friday to Tuesday in the first week of July
- Wunsiedel Culture Evening on the second Saturday in May
- Museum Festival in the Fichtelgebirge Museum on the second Sunday in September
- Wunsiedel Pub Night (Kneipennacht) beginning of November
- Wunsiedel Wood Days (Holztage; biannual) in September 2011
- Toyota Meet on the Luisenburg car park. Every first weekend in September

== Transport ==
The B 303 federal road runs two kilometres to the south of Wunsiedel, which joins the A 9 motorway from Munich to Berlin near Bad Berneck (the B 303 is the east-west link between the Czech Republic and the A 9). The new A 93 from Hof to Regensburg runs in a north-south direction, with exits at the Wunsiedel junction or state road S 2177 Hof–Wunsiedel

The nearest train station, Wunsiedel–Holenbrunn, is located in the nearby village of Holenbrunn (about three kilometres away). The nearest regional station is in Marktredwitz (on the main line from Munich via Regensburg, Hof and Nuremberg to Prague). There used to be branch lines from Holenbrunn via Wunsiedel and Tröstau to Leupoldsdorf and from Holenbrunn to Selb. These lines have now been closed and the trackbeds used as cycle paths in places.

Bus connections go from Wunsiedel Bus Station in all directions (Hof–Marktredwitz–Selb–Arzberg).

There is a regional airport at Hof-Plauen (ca. 40 km (25 mi) from Wunsiedel).

== Notable residents ==
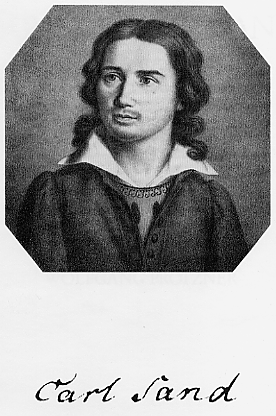
Karl Ludwig Sand

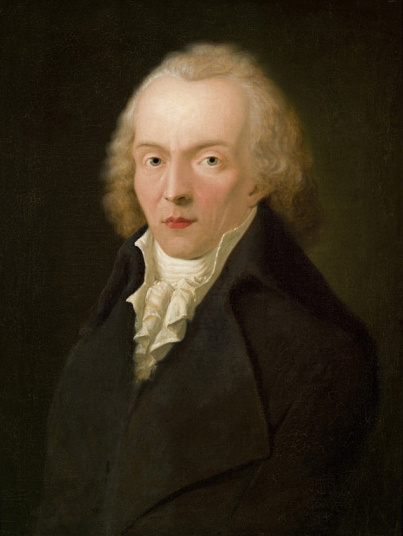
Jean Paul

- Eugen Johann Christoph Esper (1742-1810), entomologist, botanist and pathologist
- Johann David Schoepff (1752–1800), botanist, zoologist, and physician
- Jean Paul (1763–1825), author
- Karl Ludwig Sand (1795-1820), Burschenschafter, murderer of August von Kotzebue
- Heinrich Hohenner (1874-1966), professor of geodesy
- Wilhelm Wirth (1876-1952), psychologist
- Hannsheinz Bauer (1909–2005), politician (SPD), one of the "fathers" of the Basic Law,
- Friedrich Müller (1923-2003), teacher and expert for natural stone, founder of the Naturstein Archive of the State Technical College for Stone Processing in Wunsiedel
- Siegfried Roch (born 1959), handball national goalkeeper, silver medal winner
- Wolfgang Haffner (born 1965), jazz drummer

== Sources ==
- Die Kunstdenkmäler von Oberfranken, Bd. 1: Landkreis Wunsiedel und Stadtkreis Marktredwitz. 1954. ISBN 978-3-486-41941-2
