= Höchstädt =

Höchstädt may refer to:

- Höchstädt an der Donau
- Höchstädt im Fichtelgebirge
