= Gravenreuth =

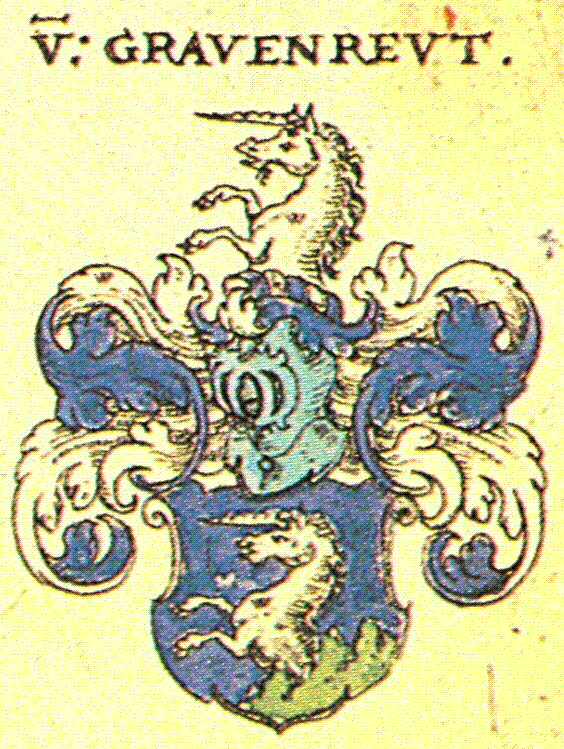
Coat of arms of the Gravenreuth family

The Gravenreuth family was an old German noble family, originally from Franconia, whose members held significant positions in Prussia and later in the German Empire.

== History ==
The family's origin seat was located in Grafenreuth, now part of Thiersheim in the District of Wunsiedel in Upper Franconia, first mentioned in 1180. Up to the 18th century, the family, awarded with the title Baron, was the owner of nearby land and villages, e.g. in the area of Marktredwitz. Lines of the family moved to Upper Palatinate, e.g. in Schlammersdorf. The family is directly related with the House of Sparneck.

In the fellowship of the Margraves of Brandenburg-Bayreuth, members of the family were part of the Order of the Red Eagle and engaged in St Georgen under that with the foundation of the Gravenreuther Stift by Georg Christoph of Gravenreuth (1667–1736), offering a home and a religious life-style for poor unmarried older men. In 1825 the Guttenthau line of family was awarded with the title of Count (German: Grafen). This line of the family went extinct in 1919. In 1816 the Hofmark Affing was bought, members of the family are still living there.

== Notable members ==
- Sigmund-Ulrich Freiherr von Gravenreuth, a German officer in the World War II
