= Sechsämtertropfen =

Liqueur

- Type: Liqueur
- Manufacturer: Schwarze & Schlichte
- Origin: Fichtel Mountains, Bavaria, Germany
- Introduced: 1895
- Alcohol by volume: 33% vol
- Flavour: Herbal, berry, root
- Ingredients: Extracts of medicinal plants, berries, roots, rowan berry
- Variants: Wild berry, hazelnut, plum
- Website: www.sechsaemtertropfen.de

Sechsämtertropfen is a liqueur produced in Germany.

The liqueur has an alcohol content of 33% vol. It gets its taste from extracts of medicinal plants, berries and roots. The rowan berry, the fruit of the rowan, plays a special role in this. Sechsämtertropfen is also produced in other flavours such as wild berry, hazelnut and plum.

The liqueur comes from the Bavarian Fichtel Mountains and was invented by the pharmacist Gottlieb Vetter and first sold in 1895. The name of the drink refers to the six historical administrative districts around the town of Wunsiedel, the Sechsämterland. Since 2001, the spirits have been sold by Schwarze & Schlichte in Oelde.

The coats of arms of these six offices adorn the bottles of the Sechsämtertropfen:

Kirchenlamitz

Weißenstadt

Thierstein

Wunsiedel

Selb

Hohenberg an der Eger
