= Thierstein =

Thierstein may refer to:

- Thierstein District, in the canton of Solothurn, Switzerland
- Thierstein, Bavaria, a municipality in the district of Wunsiedel, Germany
- the House of Thierstein, a noble family in medieval Switzerland
