= Wilhelm Wirth =

German psychologist (1876–1952)

Wilhelm Wirth (26 July 1876, Wunsiedel - 13 July 1952, Amberg) was a German psychologist. He was taught by Wilhelm Wundt.
