= Reinhard Schulz =

German musicologist (1950–2009)

- Born: 7 March 1950; Schirnding, Upper Franconia
- Died: 24 July 2009 (aged 59); Ebersberg, Germany
- Occupations: musicologist and music critic

Reinhard Schulz (7 March 1950 – 24 July 2009) was a German musicologist and music critic.

== Early life ==
Schulz was born as the son of a gatekeeper in Schirnding, Upper Franconia. He was educated in musicology, philosophy, theatre studies, sociology and psychology and received his doctorate in 1979 by Anton Webern.

== Career ==
Schulz settled in Munich as a freelance journalist and music critic and published mainly in the feuilleton of the regional and national press (including die Frankfurter Allgemeine Zeitung, the Süddeutsche Zeitung, the Frankfurter Rundschau, the Tagesspiegel), in music journals and in well over 100 of the ARD institutions' own music programmes. In 1980, he began teaching and music aesthetics of the 20th century at LMU Munich. In 1986, he became senior editor at the Neue Musikzeitung. In 1993, he received the Critics' Prize of the City of Graz. From 1994, he worked as a juror for the Preis der deutschen Schallplattenkritik and in 1997, he was co-founder of the Munich Society for Neue Musik, which is a member of the International Society for Contemporary Music. From 2000 on, he was also actively involved in the Klangspuren music festival in Schwaz/Tyrol.

Since 2012, the Reinhard-Schulz-Preis für zeitgenössische Musikpublizistik is awarded every two years.

Schulz died in Ebersberg at the age of 59.

== Publications ==
- Über das Verhältnis von Konstruktion und Ausdruck in den Werken Anton Weberns. Munich1982.
- (ed.): Habe die Ehre! – ein halbes Jahrhundert Kultur in München. Munich 2008.
