= Tröstau (Verwaltungsgemeinschaft) =

- Verwaltungsgemeinschaft
- Location of Tröstau within Wunsiedel district
- Interactive map of Tröstau
- Location within Germany Location within Bavaria
- Coordinates: 50°01′N 11°57′E
- Country: Germany
- State: Bavaria
- Admin. region: Upper Franconia
- District: Wunsiedel
- Seat: Tröstau
- Subdivisions: 3 municipalities

Area
  - Total: 36.33 km^{2} (14.03 sq mi)

Population (2025-12-31)
  - Total: 4,627
  - Density: 127.4/km^{2} (329.9/sq mi)
- Time zone: UTC+01:00 (CET)
  - Summer (DST): UTC+02:00 (CEST)
- Website: www.vg-troestau.de

Tröstau is a Verwaltungsgemeinschaft (municipal association) in the district of Wunsiedel in Bavaria, Germany. Its seat is in Tröstau.

It consists of the following municipalities:

1. Bad Alexandersbad
2. Nagel
3. Tröstau
