= Wunsiedel decision =

2009 Federal Constitutional Court case

- Court: Federal Constitutional Court
- Full case name: Order of the First Senate of 4 November 2009
- Decided: 4 November 2009
- Citation: 1 BvR 2150/08
- ECLI: ECLI:DE:BVerfG:2009:rs20091104.1bvr215008
- Transcript

The Wunsiedel decision (German: Wunsiedel-Entscheidung) is an order issued by the First Senate of the Federal Constitutional Court of Germany on 4 November 2009.

== Facts ==
Starting in 2001 an event in the honor of a prominent Nazi political figure was created and to be celebrated annually. This event was a gathering of neo-Nazi organizations and right-wing members of Germany's Democratic Party to pay tribute to Rudolf Hess, a prominent political figure in the Nazi Regime. The gathering took place in the city in which Hess is buried (Wunsiedel) and brought together upwards of 5000 people. In 2004 an amendment to the German Criminal Code took place that was used to prohibit the further advancement of this gathering. The amendment itself prohibits the disturbing of peace through the approving, glorifying, justifying of the National Socialist rule whether publicly or in an assembly. Thus in 2005 the gathering for this event was banned on the grounds that it was a significant disturbance to the peace and provided a danger to public security.

Law(s) in Question:

Article 5 of the Basic Law

1. Every person shall have the right freely to express and disseminate his opinions in speech, writing and pictures and to inform himself without hindrance from generally accessible sources. Freedom of the press and freedom of reporting by means of broadcasts and films shall be guaranteed. There shall be no censorship.

2. These rights shall find their limits in the provisions of general laws, in provisions for the protection of young persons and in the right to personal honour.

3. Arts and sciences, research and teaching shall be free. The freedom of teaching shall not release any person from

allegiance to the constitution.

Section 130(4) of the German Criminal Code: Any person who, publicly or in an assembly, disturbs the public peace by approving, glorifying or justifying the National Socialist rule of violence and arbitrariness in a manner violating the dignity of the victims shall be punished with imprisonment for up to three years or a fine.

The focus of this case reflects upon the restriction of rights through the means of the provision of general law, as the law provided through Section 130(4) of the Criminal Code would fall under the category of a general law, as opposed to a protection of the youth or the right to personal honor.

== Judicial background ==
Multiple courts dismissed lawsuits of behalf of the complainant, including: the Administrative Court of Bayreuth, the Bavarian Administrative Court and the Federal Administrative Court of Germany. On August 6, 2008 Rieger filed suit with the Federal Constitutional Court on the grounds that his constitutional right of freedom of expression was violated. While the Court rejected multiple files for injunction, it gave a decision on November 4, 2009.

== Arguments ==
Jürgen Rieger brought this constitutional complaint to the Court. He is a lawyer, a neo-Nazi, and the main organizer behind these events in honor of Hess. Riegers's main argument was that his free speech was violated in a way that was not constitutional. The amendment to the criminal code could not be categorized as any of the possible avenues laid out in the Basic Law for a limitation on free speech. The main process he seeks to eliminate, as it is the most probable category the law would fall under, is the classification of a general law. He argues that the specificity of this law targeting only the National Socialist Party immediately disqualifies it as a general law. Rieger cites communism as another threat to German Democracy but the law does not ban material on that matter. He even goes further to say that even if the new law is deemed constitutional it does not even apply in this case. Honoring a martyr does not constitute approving, glorifying, or justifying the National Socialist Party. Events celebrating Hess have already occurred without the mentioning of the persecution carried out by the Nazis, and he ensured further events would also stray away from making comments on that subject matter.

== Decision ==
It is important to make note that Rieger (the complainant) died a week before the Court delivered the decision. In normal circumstances a constitutional complaint dies with its complainant, but there are exceptions to that rule and this case fell under one. Amongst several principles, the most important was that the implications of the decision of this case were significant to a large portion of German citizens. The specific rally cited in this case brought together anywhere from 1000 to 5000 supporters (4), thus the ruling would minimally effect all of those people.

The Court did find that the section of the Criminal Code provided did in fact hinder one's freedom of expression. As the right guarantees even the most "worthless" or "dangerous" opinions. However, they found that this specific limitation was justified. They determined that the law itself fails to qualify as general law as its scope and aim are specific to the National Socialist party. Compared to a law that limits political expression regardless one's opinions or where they fall on the ideological scale. However, the Court states that the protection of the public peace is solid grounds for justifying a limit on the freedom of expression. And while this section of the Criminal Code does not qualify as a general law, the historical significance of injustice provided during the reign of the Third Reich provided an exception to this rule.

== Reaction ==
Within the small town itself there was a wave of relief. Many people would leave town during that August week or board up their homes if they chose to stay. Thus this decision was a welcome one within their community.

Politically there were opinions on both sides of the matter. While figures did not go as far as to align themselves with the Nationalist party, some saw this as an unnecessary restriction to free speech. A left wing journalist stated that enough time had passed not only since the events surrounding the matter, but since Germany had set up a democracy for this material to be banned. Also stated was that this created a minority of people within the country whose speech was being suppressed therefore creating an unequal distribution of freedom of expression.

However, others like Bavarian Interior Minister Joachim Herrmann welcomed the decision as another successful move to end the Nationalist movement.

== Subsequent development in Germany ==
While the National Socialist Party associated with the Third Reich was banned from political participation in 1952, the National Democratic Party of Germany has developed in the past decade and represents similar far-right anti-semantic ideals. However, in early 2017 the Federal Constitutional Court of Germany ruled against banning the political party. Citing its waning popularity, and virtually non-existent political power, as a lack of necessity to ban the party. Effectively stating the party lacks the means to achieve its anti-constitutional goals, and is thus not a threat to German democracy.
