= Schirnding (Verwaltungsgemeinschaft) =

- Verwaltungsgemeinschaft
- Location of Schirnding within Wunsiedel district
- Interactive map of Schirnding
- Location within Germany Location within Bavaria
- Coordinates: 50°05′N 12°14′E
- Country: Germany
- State: Bavaria
- Admin. region: Upper Franconia
- District: Wunsiedel
- Seat: Schirnding
- Subdivisions: 2 municipalities

Area
  - Total: 32.17 km^{2} (12.42 sq mi)

Population (2025-12-31)
  - Total: 2,464
  - Density: 76.59/km^{2} (198.4/sq mi)
- Time zone: UTC+01:00 (CET)
  - Summer (DST): UTC+02:00 (CEST)
- Website: www.vg-schirnding.de

Schirnding is a Verwaltungsgemeinschaft (municipal association) in the district of Wunsiedel in Bavaria, Germany. Its seat is in Schirnding.

It consists of the following municipalities:

1. Hohenberg an der Eger
2. Schirnding
