= Kohlberg (Fichtel Mountains) =

- Location within Bavaria

Highest point
- Elevation: 632 m above sea level (NN) (2,073 ft)
- Coordinates: 50°02′34″N 12°11′18″E

Geography
- Location: Bavaria, Germany
- Parent range: Fichtel Mountains

Geology
- Mountain type: Quartz phyllite

The Kohlberg (German pronunciation: [ˈkoːlbɛʁk]) is a forested mountain made of quartz phyllite in northeast Bavaria, south of Arzberg (Upper Franconia). Its summit is 632 m above sea level (NN) high and it is one of the highest mountains in the Fichtel Mountains.

== History ==
Its name comes from the old Kohlenmeilern (wood piles) used to produce charcoal for iron smelters in the Arzberg. The mountain was jocularly called the Zuckerhut (sugar hat), due to the smuggling of sugar over the old border between Bavaria and Prussia.

== Structures ==
On the summit is the Waldenfelswarte observation post and a refuge hut belonging to the Fichtelgebirge Club (not manned). At its southwestern foot lies the Feisnitz Reservoir and, to the northwest, the Röslau flows around the mountain.

== Maps ==
- Fritsch Wanderkarte 1:50.000 Fichtel Mountains-Steinwald - walking map.
