= Katharinenberg bei Wunsiedel =

Mountain in Germany

Coordinates: 50°02′01″N 12°00′41″E

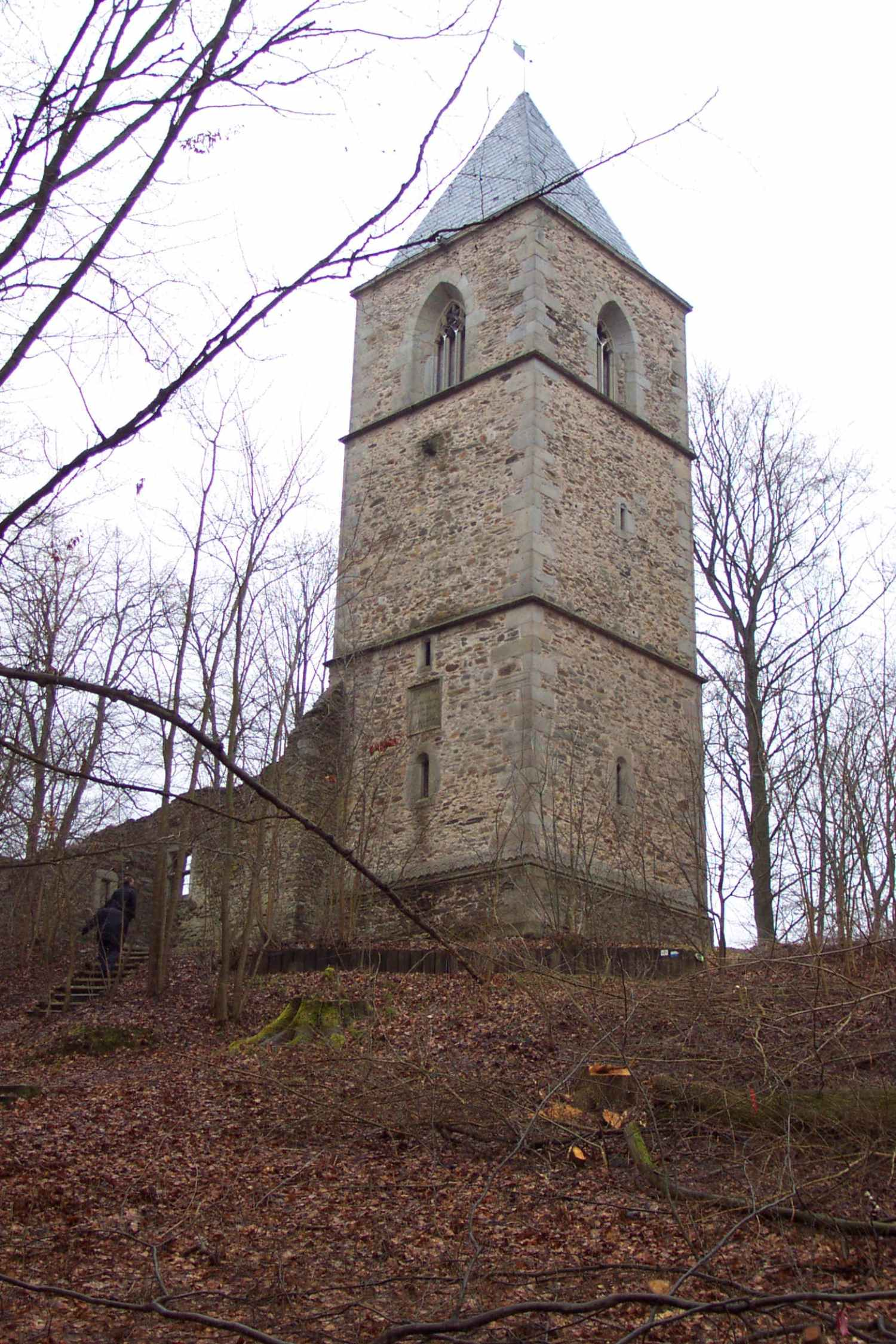
- The church ruins on the Katharinenberg

Highest point
- Elevation: 618 m (2,028 ft)

Geography
- Location: Bavaria, Germany

Katharinenberg bei Wunsiedel is a mountain close to the town of Wunsiedel in Bavaria, Germany.
