= Thiersheim (Verwaltungsgemeinschaft) =

- Verwaltungsgemeinschaft
- Location of Thiersheim within Wunsiedel district
- Interactive map of Thiersheim
- Location within Germany Location within Bavaria
- Coordinates: 50°05′N 12°08′E
- Country: Germany
- State: Bavaria
- Admin. region: Upper Franconia
- District: Wunsiedel
- Seat: Thiersheim
- Subdivisions: 3 municipalities

Area
  - Total: 52.3 km^{2} (20.2 sq mi)

Population (2025-12-31)
  - Total: 3,764
  - Density: 72.0/km^{2} (186/sq mi)
- Time zone: UTC+01:00 (CET)
  - Summer (DST): UTC+02:00 (CEST)
- Website: www.vg-thiersheim.de

Thiersheim is a Verwaltungsgemeinschaft (municipal association) in the district of Wunsiedel in Bavaria, Germany. Its seat is in Thiersheim.

It consists of the following municipalities:

1. Höchstädt im Fichtelgebirge
2. Thiersheim
3. Thierstein
