= Tröstau =

- Municipality
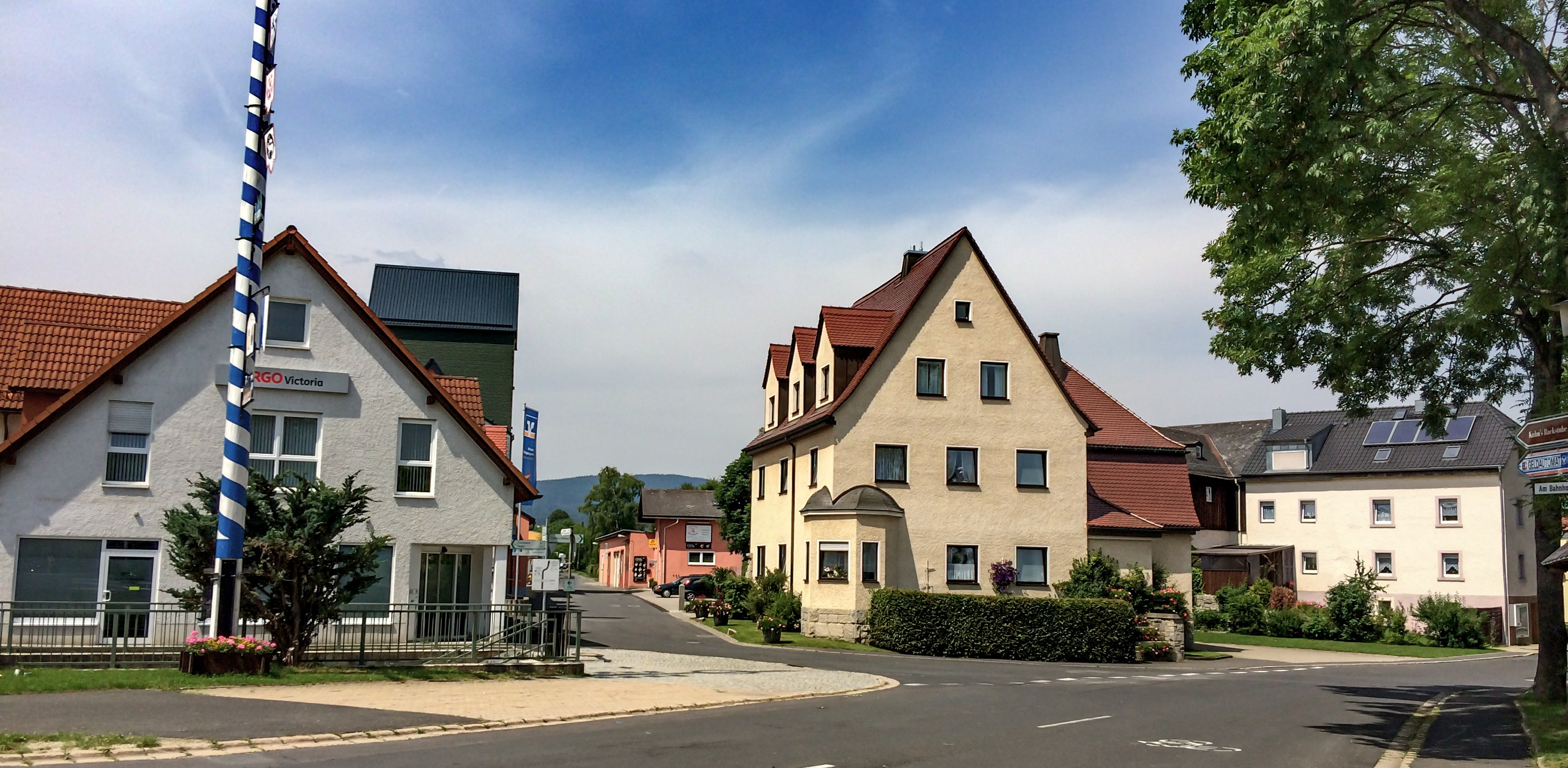
- View from the center of the village

- Coat of arms

- Location of Tröstau within Wunsiedel im Fichtelgebirge district
- Interactive map of Tröstau
- Location within Germany Location within Bavaria
- Coordinates: 50°1′N 11°57′E
- Country: Germany
- State: Bavaria
- Admin. region: Oberfranken
- District: Wunsiedel im Fichtelgebirge
- Municipal assoc.: Tröstau

Government
  - Mayor (2020–26): Rainer Klein

Area
  - Total: 19.28 km^{2} (7.44 sq mi)
- Elevation: 550 m (1,800 ft)

Population (2025-12-31)
  - Total: 2,068
  - Density: 107.3/km^{2} (277.8/sq mi)
- Time zone: UTC+01:00 (CET)
  - Summer (DST): UTC+02:00 (CEST)
- Postal codes: 95709
- Dialling codes: 09232
- Vehicle registration: WUN
- Website: www.troestau.de

Tröstau (German pronunciation: [ˈtʁøːstaʊ]) is a municipality in the district of Wunsiedel in Bavaria in Germany.
