= Schönwald, Bavaria =

Schönwald
- Town
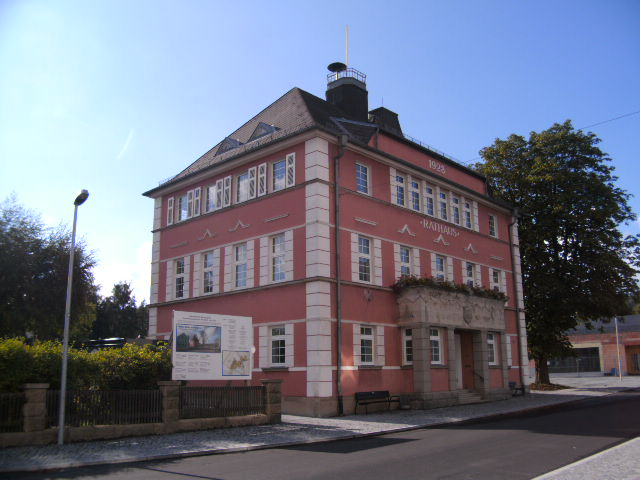
- Town hall

- Coat of arms

- Location of Schönwald within Wunsiedel im Fichtelgebirge district
- Interactive map of Schönwald
- Location within Germany Location within Bavaria
- Coordinates: 50°12′N 12°5′E
- Country: Germany
- State: Bavaria
- Admin. region: Oberfranken
- District: Wunsiedel im Fichtelgebirge

Government
  - Mayor (2020–26): Klaus Jaschke (SPD)

Area
  - Total: 19.19 km^{2} (7.41 sq mi)
- Elevation: 610–718 m (2,001–2,356 ft)

Population (2025-12-31)
  - Total: 3,066
  - Density: 159.8/km^{2} (413.8/sq mi)
- Time zone: UTC+01:00 (CET)
  - Summer (DST): UTC+02:00 (CEST)
- Postal codes: 95173
- Dialling codes: 09287
- Vehicle registration: WUN, SEL, REH, MAK
- Website: www.stadtschoenwald.de

Schönwald (German pronunciation: [ˈʃøːnvalt]) is a town in the district of Wunsiedel, in Bavaria, Germany. It is situated near the border with the Czech Republic, five km northwest of Selb and 18 km southeast of Hof.

Schönwald is famous for its porcelain industry.
