= Bad Alexandersbad =

Place in Bavaria, Germany

- Municipality
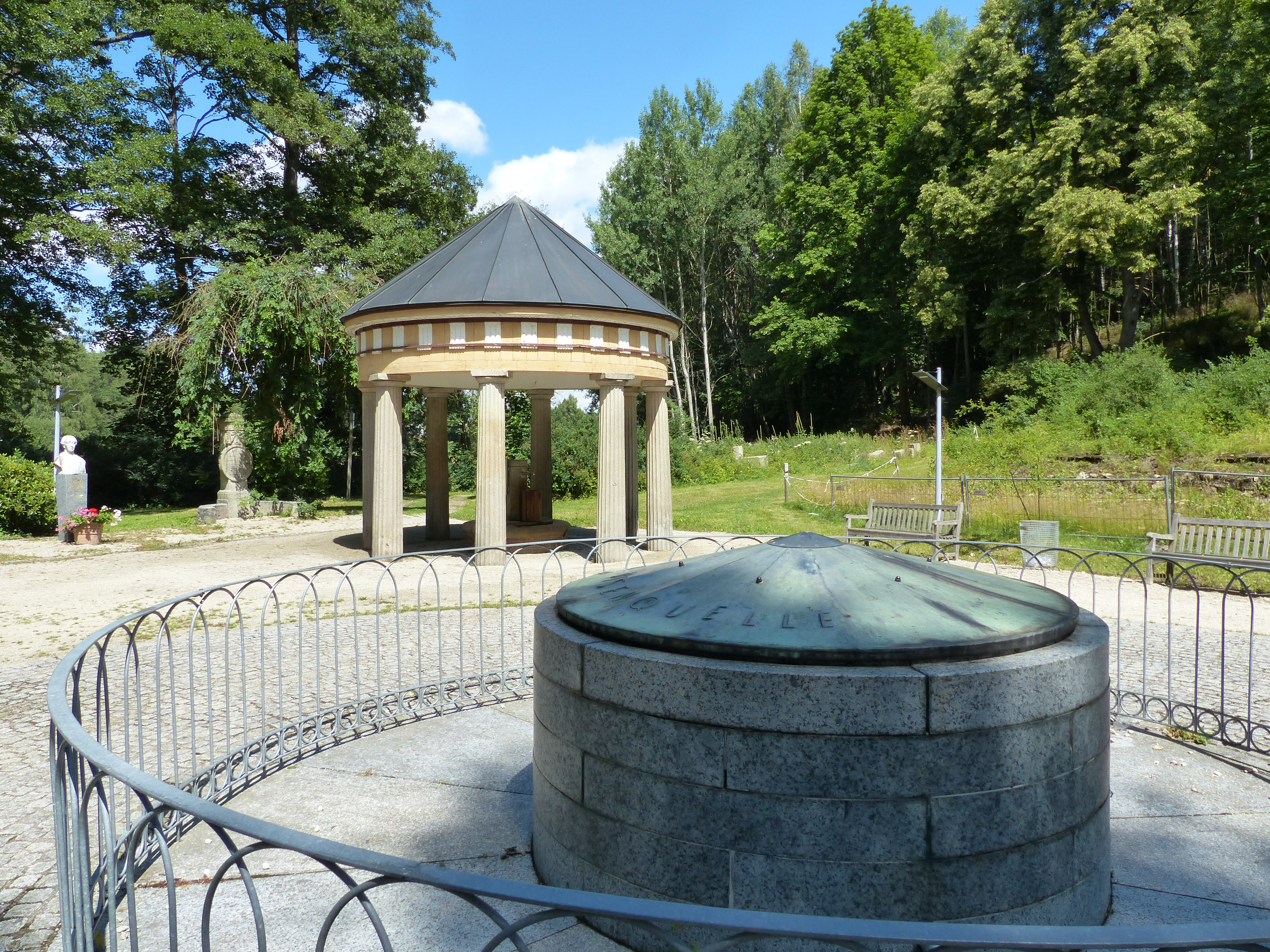
- Spa in Bad Alexandersbad

- Coat of arms

- Location of Bad Alexandersbad within Wunsiedel im Fichtelgebirge district
- Interactive map of Bad Alexandersbad
- Location within Germany Location within Bavaria
- Coordinates: 50°1′N 12°1′E
- Country: Germany
- State: Bavaria
- Admin. region: Oberfranken
- District: Wunsiedel im Fichtelgebirge
- Municipal assoc.: Tröstau
- Subdivisions: 4 Ortsteile

Government
  - Mayor (2026–32): Ronald Ledermüller (CSU)

Area
  - Total: 8.94 km^{2} (3.45 sq mi)
- Elevation: 578 m (1,896 ft)

Population (2025-12-31)
  - Total: 930
  - Density: 100/km^{2} (270/sq mi)
- Time zone: UTC+01:00 (CET)
  - Summer (DST): UTC+02:00 (CEST)
- Postal codes: 95680
- Dialling codes: 09232
- Vehicle registration: WUN
- Website: www.badalexandersbad.de

Bad Alexandersbad (German pronunciation: [baːt ʔalɛˈksandɐsˌbaːt]) is a municipality of Germany in Oberfranken (Bavaria), in the district of Wunsiedel. Population (2020): 977. The municipality consists of the villages Dünkelhammer, Kleinwendern, Sichersreuth and Tiefenbach.
