= Thiersheim =

- Municipality
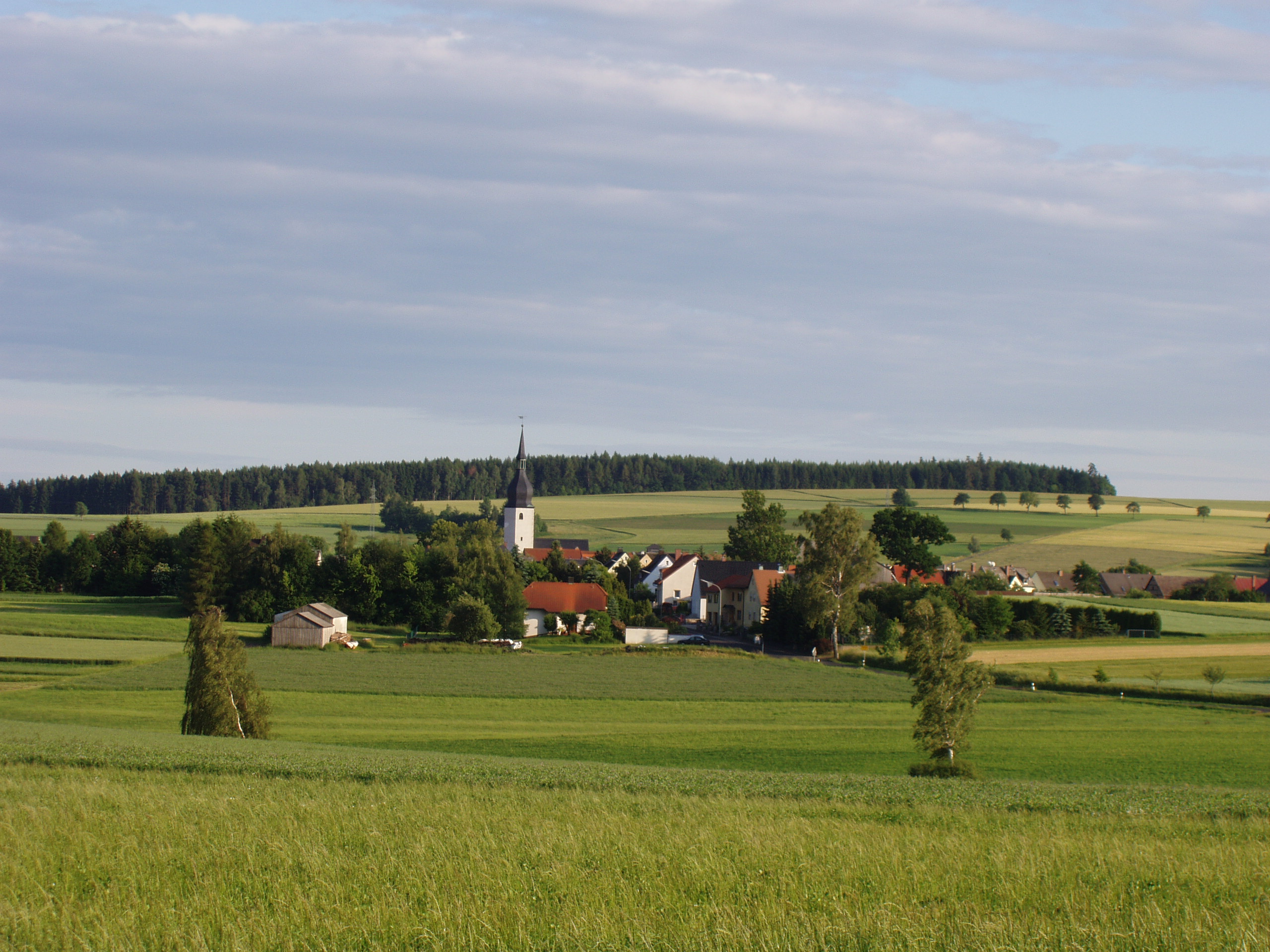
- Thiersheim seen from the north

- Coat of arms

- Location of Thiersheim within Wunsiedel im Fichtelgebirge district
- Interactive map of Thiersheim
- Location within Germany Location within Bavaria
- Coordinates: 50°4′N 12°7′E
- Country: Germany
- State: Bavaria
- Admin. region: Oberfranken
- District: Wunsiedel im Fichtelgebirge
- Municipal assoc.: Thiersheim
- Subdivisions: 9 Ortschaften

Government
  - Mayor (2020–26): Werner Frohmader

Area
  - Total: 23.69 km^{2} (9.15 sq mi)
- Elevation: 551 m (1,808 ft)

Population (2025-12-31)
  - Total: 1,706
  - Density: 72.01/km^{2} (186.5/sq mi)
- Time zone: UTC+01:00 (CET)
  - Summer (DST): UTC+02:00 (CEST)
- Postal codes: 95707
- Dialling codes: 09233
- Vehicle registration: WUN
- Website: www.thiersheim.de

Thiersheim is a municipality in the district of Wunsiedel in Bavaria in Germany.

Grafenreuth, now a part of Thiersheim, was the seat of the noble family Gravenreuth for centuries.

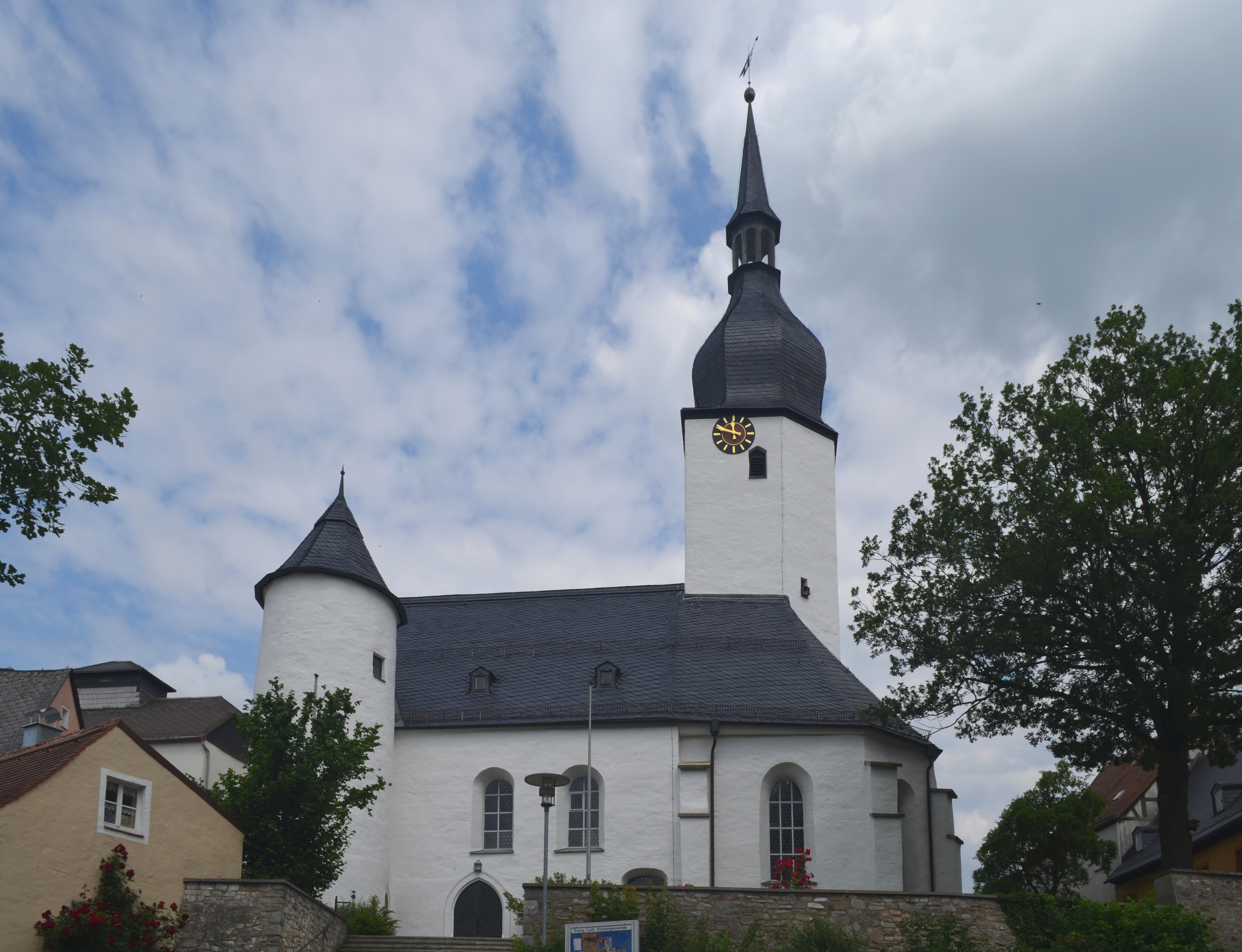
Evangelical Lutheran Church Sankt Ägidien (Saint Giles).

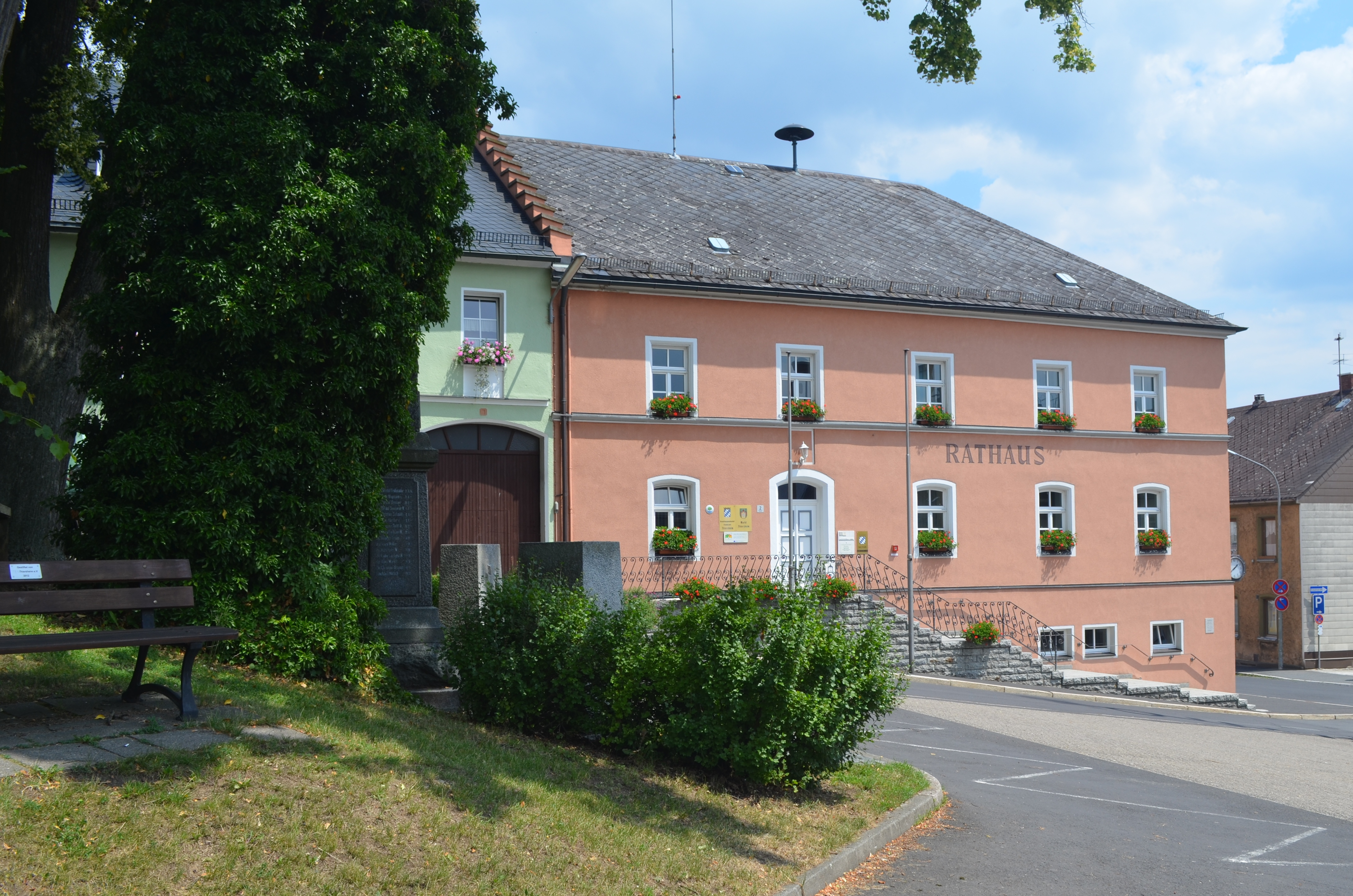
Rathaus.

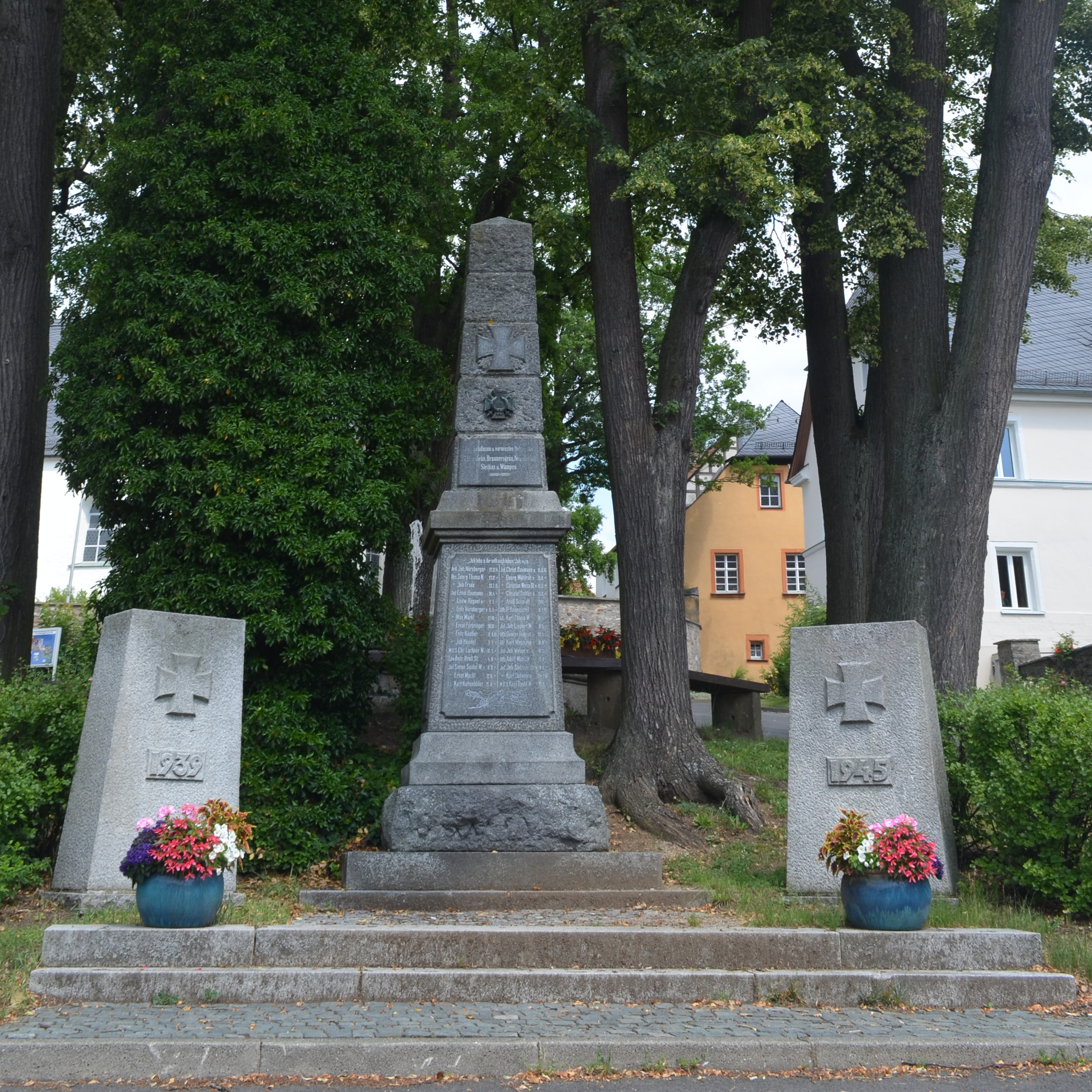
War memorial.

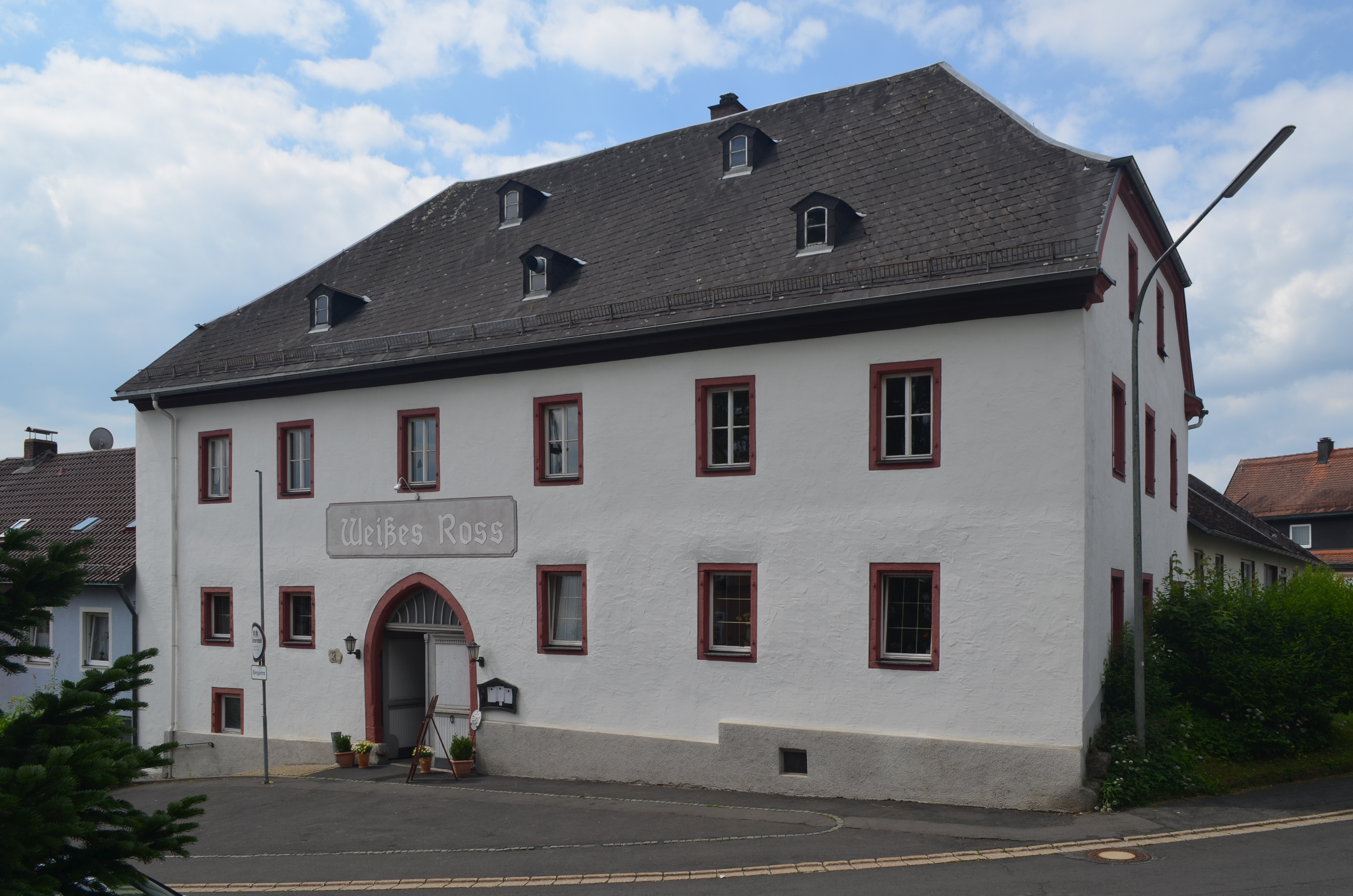
Gasthaus Weisses Ross.
