= Wunsiedel Marble =

Marble type

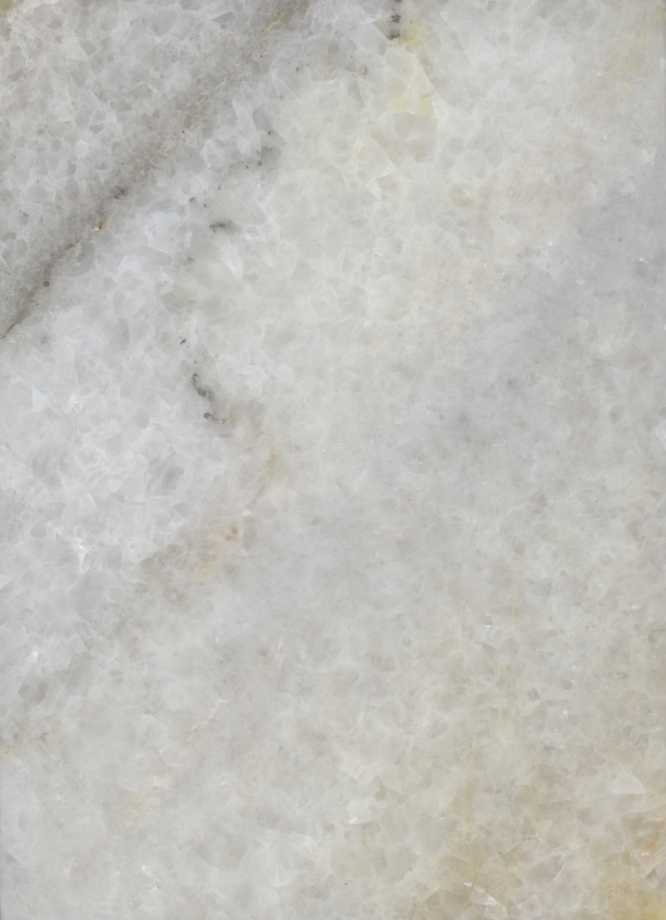
Wunsiedel Marble from the quarry in Holenbrunn

Wunsiedel Marble (German: Wunsiedler Marmor) is a group of metamorphic carbonate rocks, which were, and are, mainly extracted in the German town Wunsiedel at several quarries. This Upper Franconian calcite marble occurs both in this region and beyond, particularly in Bavaria. It is found in a northern band (around Wunsiedel) and southern band (at Marktredwitz and Arzberg).

== Examples of use ==
Wunsiedel

- Cemetery, grave slabs
- Town hall, flooring
- Courtyard design of the primary and secondary school (extension)

Fuchsmühl

- Mariahilf pilgrimage church, flooring

== See also ==
- List of types of marble

== Sources ==
- F. Eder / U. Emmert / G. v. Horstig / G. Stettner: Geologische Übersichtskarte 1:200.000, CC 6334 Bayreuth. Hannover (Bundesanstalt für Geowissenschaften und Rohstoffe) 1981
- C. Gäbert / A. Steuer / Karl Weiss: Die nutzbaren Gesteinsvorkommen Deutschlands. Berlin (Union Dt. Verlagsgesellschaft) 1915
- Dietmar Herrmann: Vom Bergbau im Fichtelgebirge (Teil 2). Beiträge zur Geschichts- und Landeskunde des Fichtelgebirges 12 (1990), Wunsiedel (Buchhandlung Kohler) 1990
- Arndt / Henrich / Laubmann et al.: Die nutzbaren Mineralien, Gesteine und Erden Bayerns. I. Bd. Frankenwald, Fichtelgebirge und Bayerischer Wald. München (Oldenbourg und Piloty&Loehle) 1924
- Friedrich Müller: Bayerns steinreiche Ecke. Hof (Ackermann Verlag) 1990 ISBN 3-8112-0845-4
- Otto M. Reis: Die Gesteine der Münchner Bauten und Denkmäler. Veröffentlichungen der Gesellschaft für Bayerische Landeskunde, e.V. München. München 1935

== See also ==
- List of types of marble
