= Luisenburg Rock Labyrinth =

Coordinates: 50°00′43″N 11°59′32″E

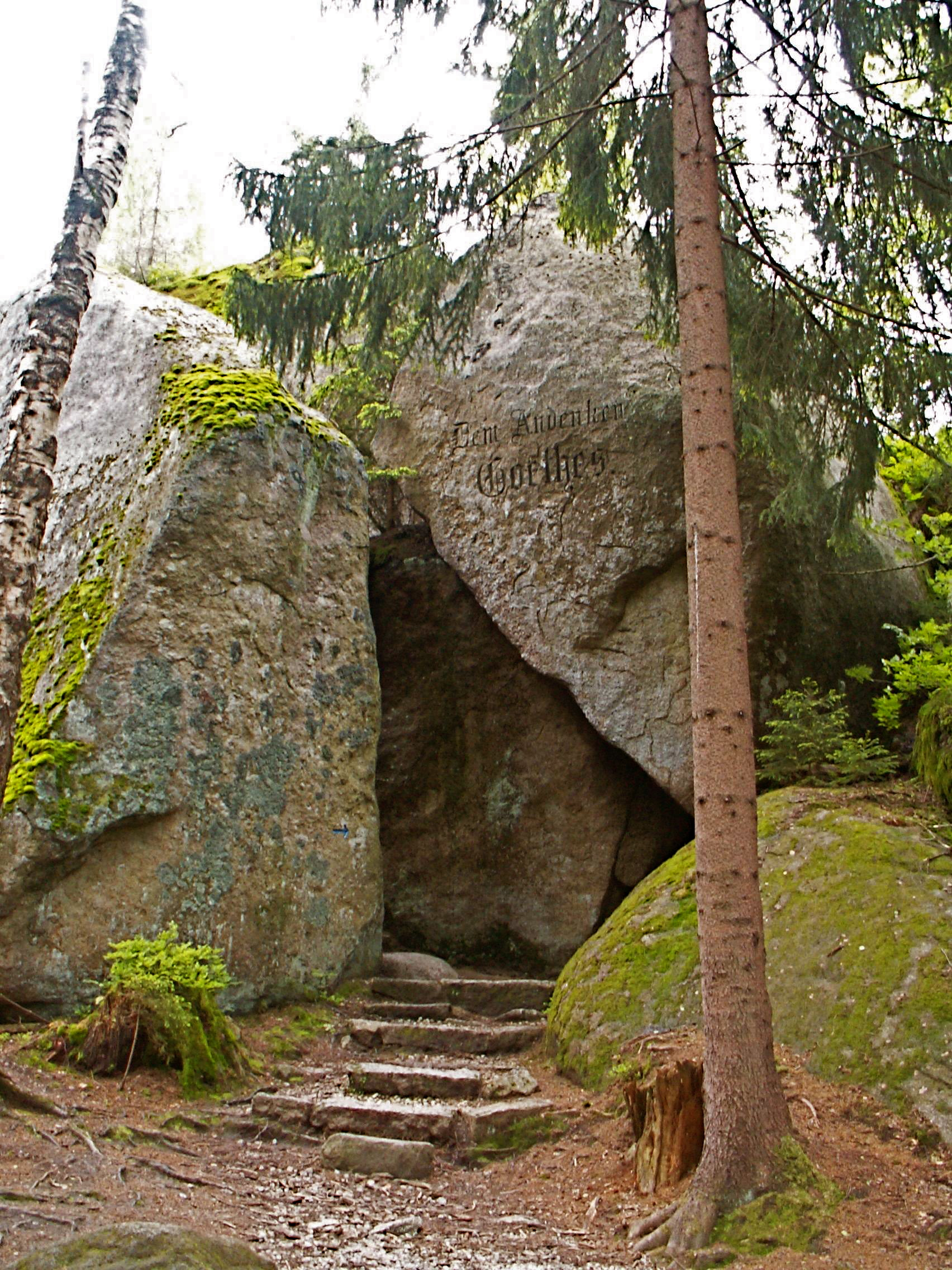
Goethe Rocks

The Luisenburg Rock Labyrinth (German: Luisenburg-Felsenlabyrinth) is a felsenmeer made of granite blocks several metres across and is part of the Großes Labyrinth Nature Reserve near Wunsiedel in Germany. For a long time its formation was believed to have been caused by natural disasters such as earthquakes. Today it is known that processes such as weathering and erosion over a long period are much more likely to have been responsible for the formation of the rock labyrinth.

Goethe wrote in 1820

The enormous size of the granite blocks, piled on one another without rhyme or reason gives an impression the like of which I have never come across on all my walks and no-one can be blamed for explaining this chaotic state of affairs that excites astonishment, fear and dread, by calling on the help of floods and cloudbursts, storms and earthquakes, volcanoes and whatever else nature may violently conjure up. However on closer inspection, and with a detailed knowledge of that which nature, acting quietly and patiently, is able to do in a most extraordinary way, another solution to this puzzle offers itself to us (...)

The well-rounded shapes of the individual blocks were formed by spheroidal weathering (Wollsackverwitterung) in the tropical, humid climate of the Cenozoic era. Over the course of time they were left behind as the ground around was eroded; they became unstable and began to shift. This resulted in the jumble of rocks with wild, romantic paths through the narrow clefts and steep steps.

== Tourism ==
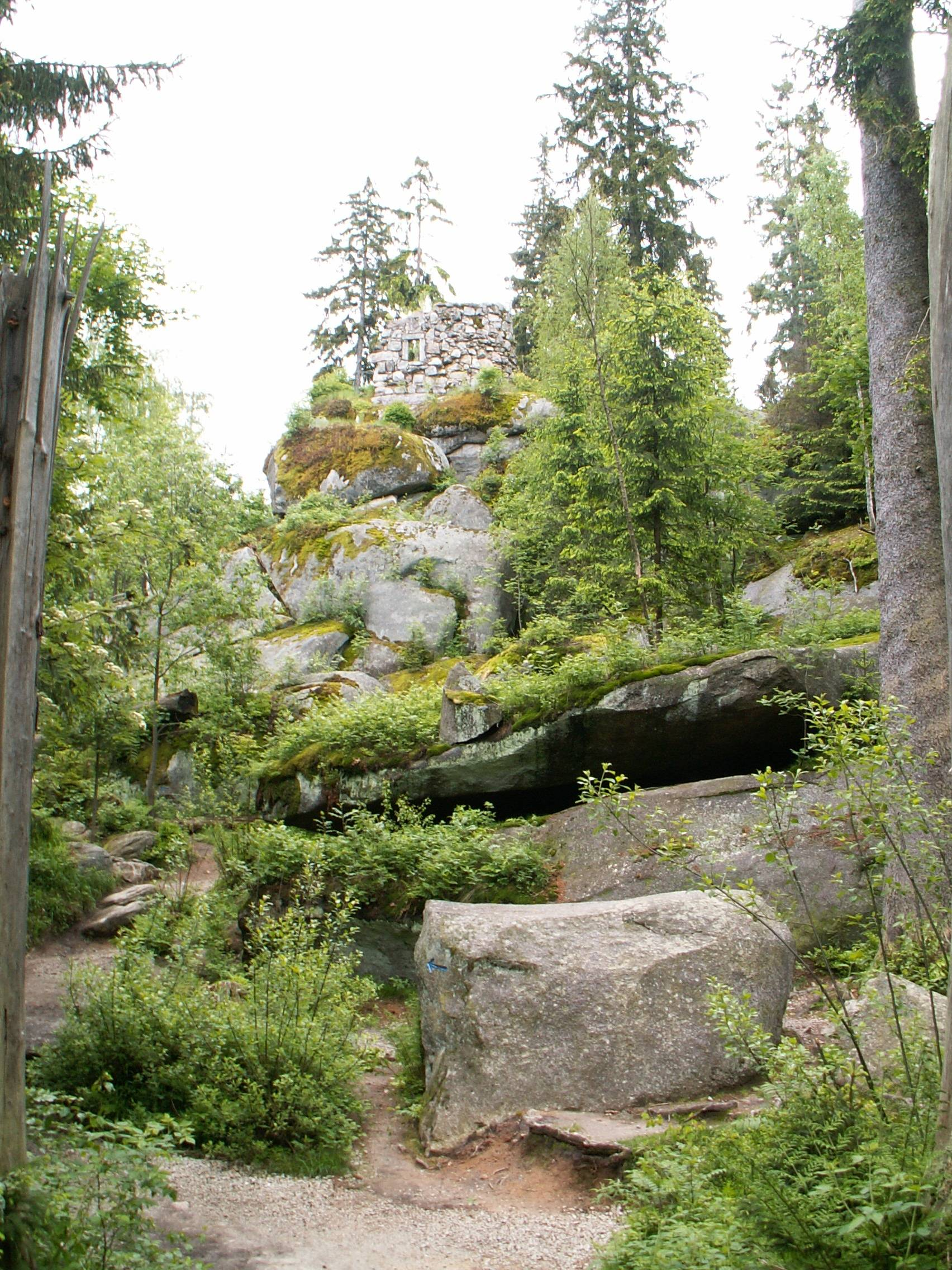
False ruins above Prinz Ludwig Platz

The jumble of rocks (a blockfield) named after Queen Louise was already being exploited for tourism in the 18th century and it is also well-known today as a result of the natural amphitheatre surrounded by rocks as well as the annual Luisenburg Pageant that take place there.

The concept of opening it up and exploiting it was heavily influenced by the Society for the Portrayal of the History, Customs and Rights of the Fatherland (Gesellschaft zur Aufklärung vaterländischer Geschichte, Sitte und Rechte) established in Wunsiedel in 1784. The local townsfolk began around 1790 to turn the rocky area into a landscape garden. The first construction phase lasted until about 1800 and, referring to remnants of an ancient motte nearby, resulted in the name Luxburg, which was changed in 1805 to Luisenburg. Visitors to the site had to stoop or even crawl if they wanted to explore its natural beauty. For the nobility of the time this was a rare posture that for many of them gave it an additional charm. In 1805 the Prussian queen visited the prehistoric, natural wonder with her husband, Frederick William III and, totally spellbound, told her son about the experience. A second construction phase took place between 1811 and 1815. The Luisenburg developed into a jewel of civic culture and landscape architecture.

The terrain was used in 1794 for the singspiel Die kleine Ährenleserin by Johann Adam Hiller and Christian Felix Weiße.

== Today ==
Today the rock labyrinth is a popular destination and can be appreciated by anyone with stout footwear. Children also enjoy climbing and crawling over the rocks. In 2006 the rock labyrinth was awarded the status of a national geotope.

The site is owned and maintained by Wunsiedel town council (forestry department). They charge an entry price of EUR 7.00 for adults (as of September 2023) (with reductions for children, etc.), which is used for the care and preservation of this natural monument.

== Sources ==
- Karl Braun: Luisenburg. Ein vergessener Landschaftsgarten der Frühromantik. Jonas, Marburg 2005, ISBN 3-89445-349-4 (in German)
- Dr. Hans Vollet und Kathrin Heckel: Die Ruinenzeichnungen des Plassenburgkartographen Johann Christoph Stierlein. 1987. (in German)
