= Wunsiedel (district) =

Coordinates: 50°05′N 12°05′E

- District
- Flag Coat of arms
- Country: Germany
- State: Bavaria
- Adm. region: Upper Franconia
- Capital: Wunsiedel

Government
  - District admin. (2026–32): Peter Berek (CSU)

Area
  - Total: 606.40 km^{2} (234.13 sq mi)

Population (31 December 2025)
  - Total: 69,990
  - Density: 115.4/km^{2} (298.9/sq mi)
- Time zone: UTC+01:00 (CET)
  - Summer (DST): UTC+02:00 (CEST)
- Vehicle registration: WUN, MAK, REH, SEL
- Website: landkreis-wunsiedel.de

Wunsiedel (German: Landkreis Wunsiedel i. Fichtelgebirge) is a Landkreis (district) in the northeastern part of Bavaria, Germany. Neighbouring districts are (from the south clockwise) Tirschenreuth, Bayreuth, Hof, and to the east the Czech Republic.

== Geography ==
The district is located in the Fichtel Mountains, with the highest elevation being the 1,051 m high Schneeberg. The river Ohře originates in the district.

== History ==
In the Bavarian communal reforms of 1972 the district was merged with the previously district-free cities Marktredwitz and Selb, as well as parts of the dissolved district of Rehau.

== Coat of arms ==
The coat of arms shows an eagle in the bottom left as the symbol of the city Marktredwitz, and a deer antler to the right as the symbol of the city Selb. In the top are the black-and-white symbol of the Zollern dynasty. The coat of arms was granted in 1974.

== Towns and municipalities ==
Clickable map of towns and municipalities in the district

Towns
1. Arzberg
2. Bad Weißenstadt
3. Kirchenlamitz
4. Marktleuthen
5. Marktredwitz
6. Schönwald
7. Selb
8. Wunsiedel
Municipalities
1. Röslau

Verwaltungsgemeinschaften
1. Schirnding; 1. Hohenberg an der Eger^{2}; 2. Schirnding^{1,3}	2. Thiersheim; 1. Höchstädt im Fichtelgebirge; 2. Thiersheim^{1,3}; 3. Thierstein^{3}	3. Tröstau; 1. Bad Alexandersbad; 2. Nagel; 3. Tröstau^{1}
^{1}seat of the Verwaltungsgemeinschaft; ^{2}town; ^{3}Markt
