= Höchstädt im Fichtelgebirge =

Höchstädt i.Fichtelgebirge
- Municipality
- Coat of arms

- Location of Höchstädt i.Fichtelgebirge within Wunsiedel im Fichtelgebirge district
- Interactive map of Höchstädt i.Fichtelgebirge
- Location within Germany Location within Bavaria
- Coordinates: 50°06′N 12°05′E
- Country: Germany
- State: Bavaria
- Admin. region: Oberfranken
- District: Wunsiedel im Fichtelgebirge
- Municipal assoc.: Thiersheim

Government
  - Mayor (2020–26): Gerald Bauer (CSU)

Area
  - Total: 14.95 km^{2} (5.77 sq mi)
- Elevation: 565 m (1,854 ft)

Population (2025-12-31)
  - Total: 1,007
  - Density: 67.36/km^{2} (174.5/sq mi)
- Time zone: UTC+01:00 (CET)
  - Summer (DST): UTC+02:00 (CEST)
- Postal codes: 95186
- Dialling codes: 09235
- Vehicle registration: WUN
- Website: www.95186-hoechstaedt.de

Höchstädt im Fichtelgebirge (German pronunciation: [ˈhøːçˌʃtɛt ʔɪm ˈfɪçtl̩ɡəˌbɪʁɡə], lit. 'Höchstädt in the Fichtel Mountains') is a municipality in the district of Wunsiedel in Bavaria in Germany.
