= Schirnding =

- Municipality
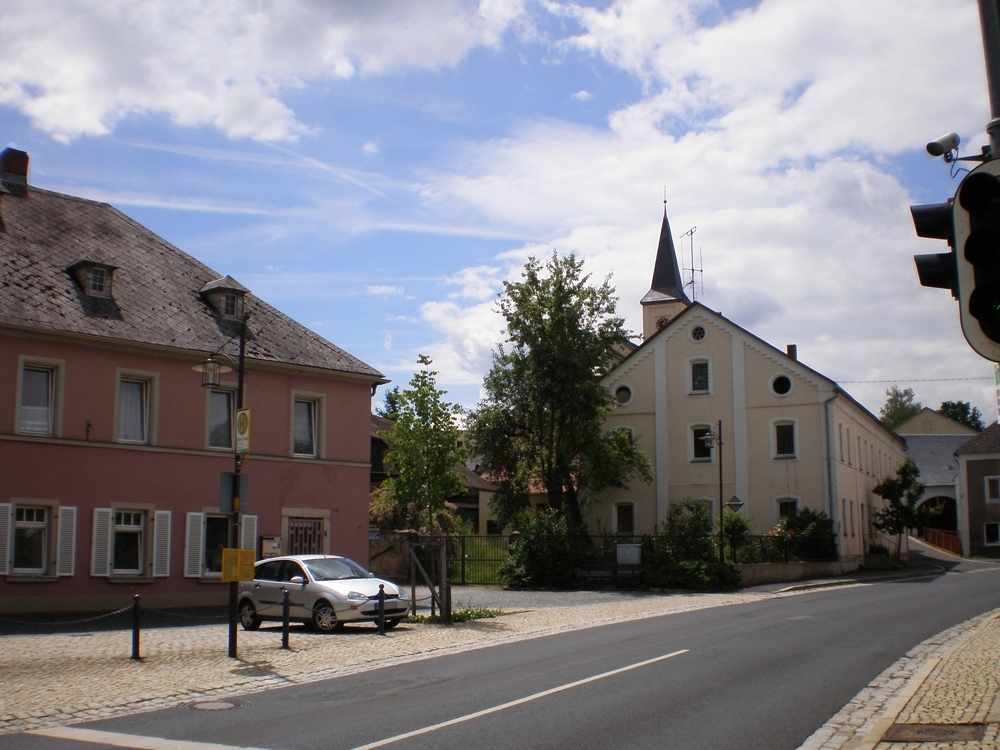
- Market square

- Coat of arms

- Location of Schirnding within Wunsiedel im Fichtelgebirge district
- Interactive map of Schirnding
- Location within Germany Location within Bavaria
- Coordinates: 50°4′N 12°13′E
- Country: Germany
- State: Bavaria
- Admin. region: Oberfranken
- District: Wunsiedel im Fichtelgebirge
- Municipal assoc.: Schirnding
- Subdivisions: 7 Ortsteile

Government
  - Mayor (2020–26): Karin Fleischer (CSU)

Area
  - Total: 16.51 km^{2} (6.37 sq mi)
- Elevation: 459 m (1,506 ft)

Population (2025-12-31)
  - Total: 1,102
  - Density: 66.75/km^{2} (172.9/sq mi)
- Time zone: UTC+01:00 (CET)
  - Summer (DST): UTC+02:00 (CEST)
- Postal codes: 95706
- Dialling codes: 09233
- Vehicle registration: WUN
- Website: www.markt-schirnding.de

Schirnding (German pronunciation: [ˈʃɪʁndɪŋ]) is a municipality in the district of Wunsiedel in Bavaria in Germany. Schirnding station is a border station on the Nuremberg–Cheb railway.

Musicologist Reinhard Schulz (1950–2009) was born in the place.
