= Thierstein, Bavaria =

Thierstein
- Municipality
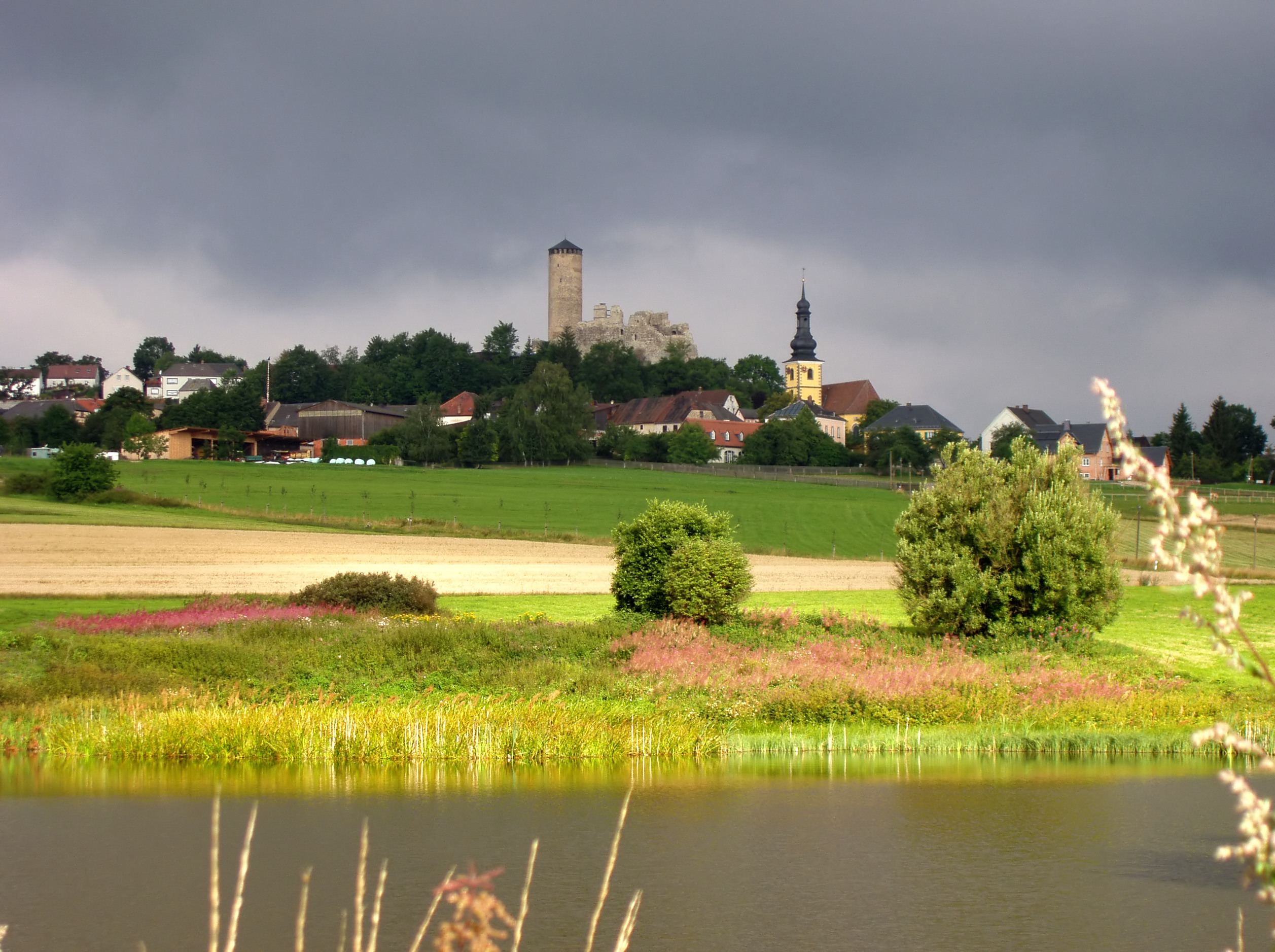
- Thierstein seen from the south

- Coat of arms

- Location of Thierstein within Wunsiedel im Fichtelgebirge district
- Interactive map of Thierstein
- Location within Germany Location within Bavaria
- Coordinates: 50°6′N 12°5′E
- Country: Germany
- State: Bavaria
- Admin. region: Oberfranken
- District: Wunsiedel im Fichtelgebirge
- Municipal assoc.: Thiersheim

Government
  - Mayor (2020–26): Thomas Schobert (FW)

Area
  - Total: 12.93 km^{2} (4.99 sq mi)
- Elevation: 600 m (2,000 ft)

Population (2025-12-31)
  - Total: 1,051
  - Density: 81.28/km^{2} (210.5/sq mi)
- Time zone: UTC+01:00 (CET)
  - Summer (DST): UTC+02:00 (CEST)
- Postal codes: 95199
- Dialling codes: 09235
- Vehicle registration: WUN
- Website: www.thierstein.de

Thierstein is a municipality in the district of Wunsiedel in Bavaria in Germany.
