= Langenau (disambiguation) =

Langenau is a town in the county of Alb-Donau-Kreis, Baden-Württemberg, Germany.

Langenau may also refer to:

== Places ==
=== Germany ===
- Langenau (Brand-Erbisdorf), village in the borough of Brand-Erbisdorf, county of Mittelsachsen, Saxony
- Langenau (Flieden), village in the borough of Langenau der Gemeinde Flieden, county of Fulda, Hesse
- Langenau (Geroldsgrün), village in the municipality of Geroldsgrün, county of Hof, Bavaria
- Langenau (Hartha), village in the borough of Hartha, county of Mittelsachsen, Saxony
- Langenau (Kreuztal), village in the borough of Kreuztal in the county of Siegen-Wittgenstein, North Rhine-Westphalia, see Buschhütten#Langenau
- Langenau (Schopfheim), village in the borough of Schopfheim, county of Lörrach, Baden-Württemberg
- Langenau (Tettau), village in the borough of Tettau, county of Kronach, Bavaria, see Tettau (Oberfranken)
- Langenau (island) (Nonnenaue), an island in the Rhine south of Ginsheim

=== Poland ===
- Czernica (Langenau über Hirschberg and Schloss Langenau), in the voivodeship of Lower Silesia
- Dłużyna Dolna (Nieder Langenau), village in the borough of Pieńsk (Penzig) in the voivodeship of Lower Silesia
- Dłużyna Górna (Ober Langenau), village in the borough of Pieńsk (Penzig) in the voivodeship of Lower Silesia
- Długopole Dolne (Niederlangenau)
- Długopole-Zdrój (Bad Langenau)
- Długopole Górne (Oberlangenau)
- Langenau near Danzig (Gdańsk), West Prussia
- Langenau near Rosenberg (Susz), West Prussia

=== Romania ===
- Câmpulung, town in the county of Argeș in Wallachia

=== Czech Republic ===
- Lánov, municipality in Trutnov district
- Skalice u České Lípy, municipality in Česká Lípa district
- Dolní Lánov (Nieder Langenau), municipality in Trutnov district
- Dlouhé, village in the borough of Nový Hrádek in Náchod district
- Dlouhý Luh, abandoned village on the Hradiště Training Area in Karlovy Vary district
- Horní Lánov (Ober Langenau), village in the borough of Lánov in Trutnov district
- Prostřední Lánov (Mittel Langenau), village in the borough of Lánov in Trutnov district
- Malý Lánov (Klein Langenau), village of Dolní Lánov in Trutnov district

== People ==
- Amelie von Langenau (1830/33–1902), Baroness, Austrian Methodist, women's rights campaigner
- Ferdinand von Langenau (1817–1881), Austrian diplomat
- Jutta Langenau (1933–1982), German swimmer, MdV
- Ute Langenau (born 1966), German volleyball player

== See also ==
- Langenau Castle (in Obernhof, Rhein-Lahn-Kreis, Rhineland-Palatinate)
- Langenau Stadium (Stadium of SC Eltersdorf)
- Langau
- Langnau (disambiguation)
- Längenau
- Clydau, the present name of the Welsh town previously known as Llangeneu
