= Epprechtstein Castle =

- Burg Epprechtstein
- Kirchenlamitz-"Epprechtstein"
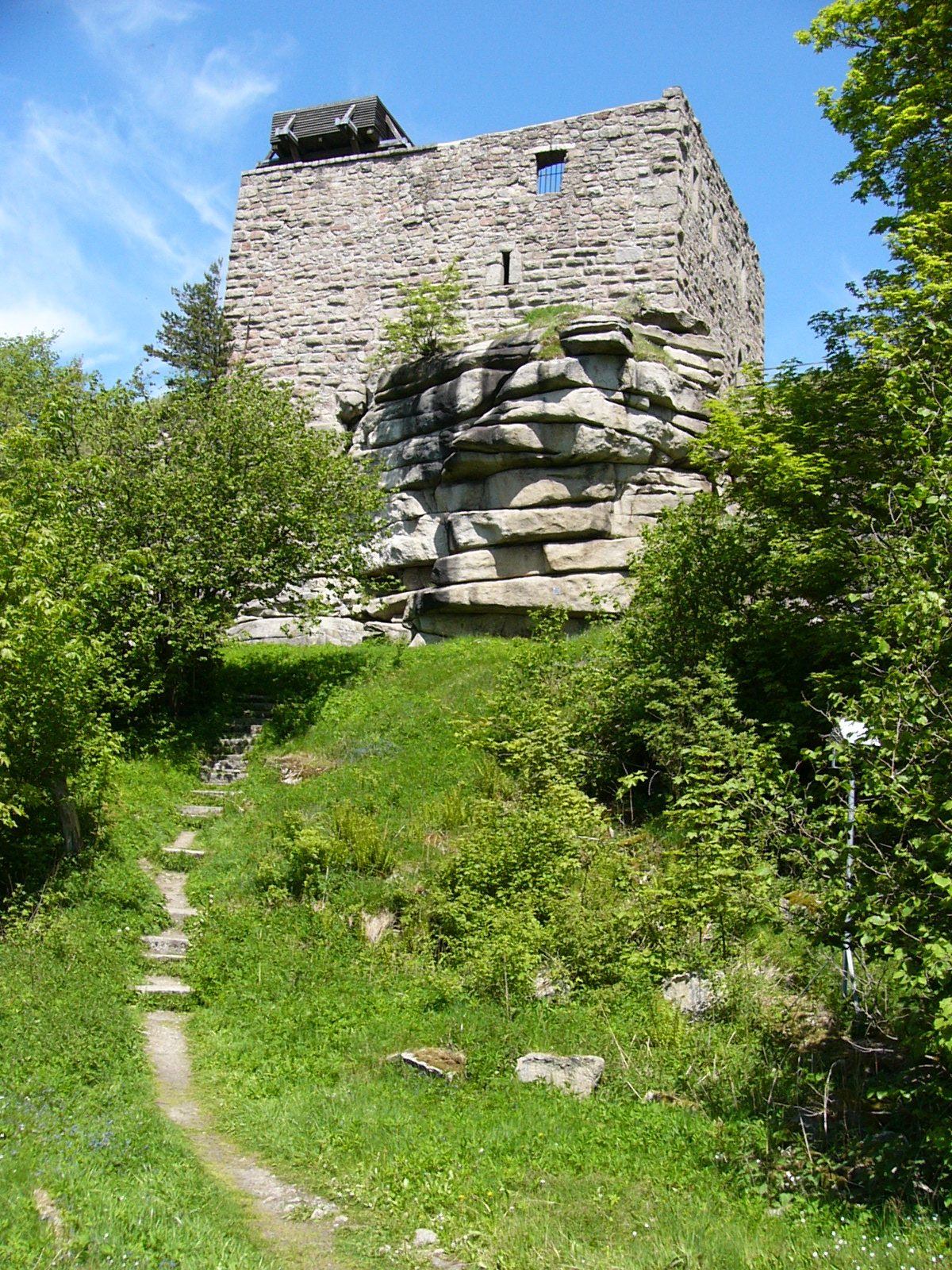
- Epprechtstein Castle: ruins of the tower house with an observation platform on the top

Site information
- Type: hill castle, summit site
- Code: DE-BY
- Condition: ruin

Location
- Coordinates: 50°08′45″N 11°55′02″E
- Height: 782.1 m above sea level (NN)

Site history
- Built: Probably between 1150 and 1180
- Materials: Ashlar and rusticated masonry

Epprechtstein Castle (German: Burg Epprechtstein) is a former hill castle on the mountain of the same name, the Epprechtstein, which rises above the village of Kirchenlamitz.

== History ==
An Eberhardus de Eckebretsteine was first mentioned in the records in a deed of gift by Duke Otto II of Merania in 1248. In 1308, King Henry VII of Germany enfeoffed the brothers Ulrich, Henry and Nickel, of the House of Sack, with the fortress of Epprechtstein; the Wilds were co-owners. In 1337 Emperor Louis IV enfeoffed Vogt Henry of Plauen with a small part of the castle. In 1352, the burgraves of Nuremberg stormed the robber baron castle and were given it as a fief. Amongst the attackers was Henry of Kotzau with his two brothers. In 1355/1356 they purchased the castle, the office and the parish of Kirchenlamitz outright, whereupon Epprechtstein and Kirchenlamitz became part of Sechsämterland ("Six District Land") and the seat of its officials, the Amtmänner. The castle tower was part of the defensive system of the "Wartordnung" of 1498. In the 16th century, the castle was destroyed by troops of Vogt Henry of Plauen and fell into ruin.

The ruins were researched in the 18th century by local historian, Johann Theodor Benjamin Helfrecht, and cartographer, Johann Christoph Stierlein. The artist, Georg Könitzer, sketched a lithograph of the ruins as part of his field of interest around the Fichtel Mountains.

== Description ==
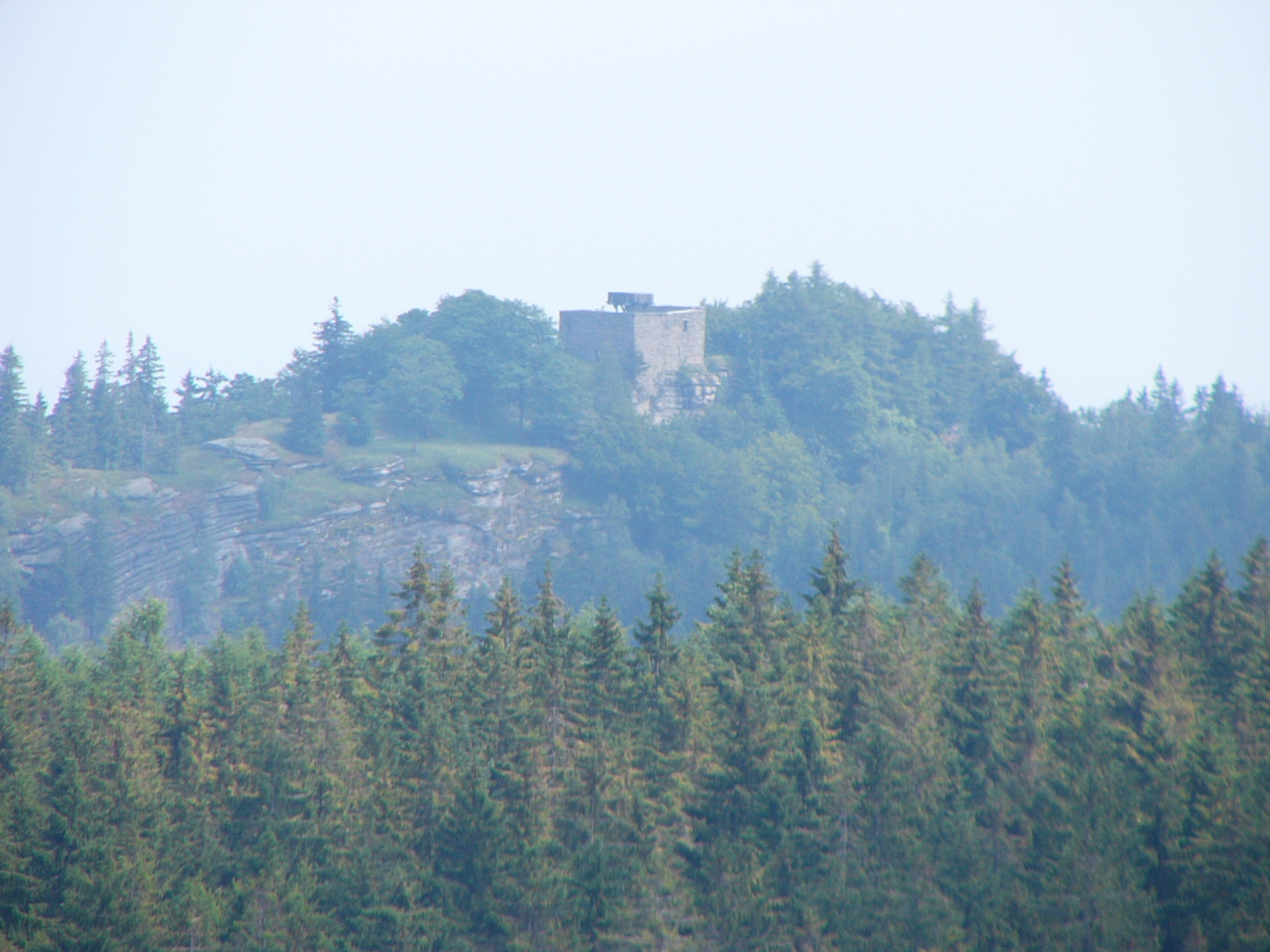
View of the Epprechtstein from the Hoher Stein

The ruins of Epprechtstein Castle stand on the treeless summit on an elongated granite ledge the sides of which drop away steeply. The ruins comprise the old tower house on which a staircase leads to a viewing platform. From the lookout is an all-round view of the Waldstein ridge, to the Großer Kornberg, to Schwarzenbach an der Saale and Oberkotzau as far as Hof, south over the interior Fichtel Mountains to Kösseine. 250 metres southeast is the service hut of the Kirchenlamitz mountain rescue organization.

== Literature ==
- Werner Bergmann: 750 Jahre Burg Epprechtstein - Die Geschichte von Burg und Amt Epprechtstein/Kirchenlamitz. Verlag der Stadt Kirchenlamitz, 1998.
- Werner Bergmann: Aussichtspunkt Epprechtstein. In: Der Siebenstern. Vol. 5/2010. pp. 223–226.
- Bernhard Hermann Röttger: Landkreis Wunsiedel und Stadtkreis Marktredtwitz. Die Kunstdenkmäler von Bayern, VIII. Regierungsbezirk Oberfranken, Band 1. Munich, 1954, ISBN 3-486-41941-2, pp. 104–107.
- Hans Vollet und Kathrin Heckel: Die Ruinenzeichnungen des Plassenburgkartographen Johann Christoph Stierlein. 1987.
