= Epprechtstein =

Mountain in Bavaria, Germany

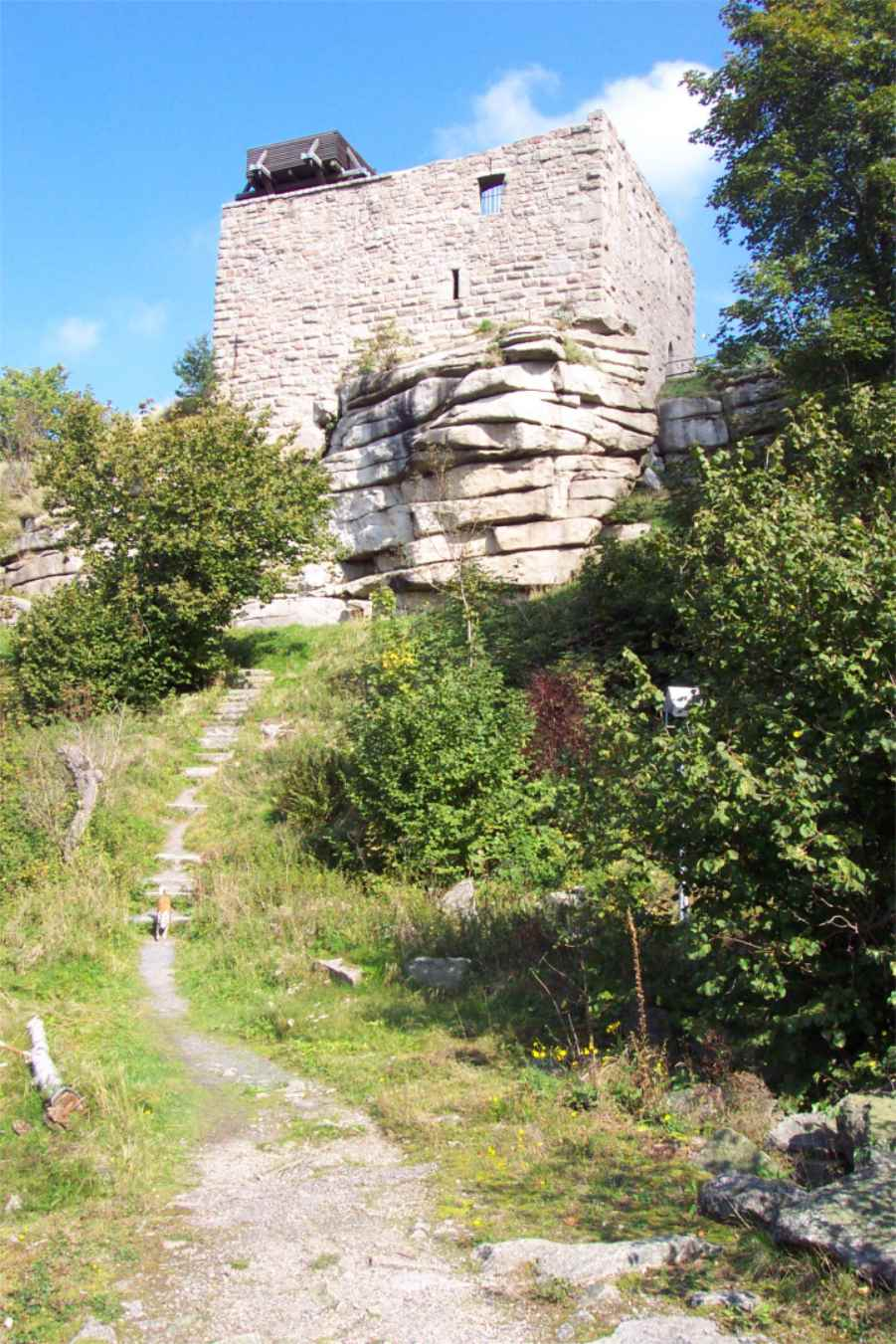

Highest point
- Elevation: 798 m above sea level (NN) (2,618 ft)
- Coordinates: 50°08′45″N 11°55′01″E

Geography
- Location within Bavaria
- Location: Bavaria, Germany
- Parent range: northern Fichtel Mountains

The Epprechtstein is a mountain in the northern Fichtel Mountains in northeast Bavaria, Germany, 798 m above sea level (NN). It is mineralogically the most interesting mountain in the entire Fichtel range. Around the summit there are about 20 quarries, in three of which Epprechtstein granite is quarried. The others are closed and partially overgrown.

== Climb ==
The mountain may be climbed from Buchhaus to the north on one of the Fichtelgebirge Club's main hiking trails.

== Ruins of Epprechtstein Castle ==
On the treeless summit on a long, steep-sided, granite slab stands the ruined castle of Epprechtstein. This is the old tower-like main residence on which a staircase has been built leading to an observation platform. From here there is a panoramic view of the Waldstein ridge, the Großer Kornberg, to Schwarzenbach an der Saale and Oberkotzau as far as Hof, and south to the inner Fichtel Mountains and Kösseine. Two hundred and fifty metres southeast is a service hut belonging to the Kirchenlamitz Mountain Rescue service.

=== History of the castle ===
In a deed of gift by Duke Otto II of Merania a certain Eberhardus de Eckebretsteine was mentioned for the first time in 1248. In 1308 King Henry VII enfeoffed the brothers Ulrich, Henry and Nickel, known as the Sacks, with Epprechtstein fortress; the Wilds being co-owners. In 1337 Emperor Louis of Bavaria enfeoffed the bailiff (Vogt) Henry of Plauen with a small part of the fortress. In 1352 the burgraves of Nuremberg stormed the 'robber castle', and were then granted it as a fief. In 1355/1356, they bought the castle and took full possession of both the fortress and the Office (Amt) of Kirchenlamitz. Two hundred years later the castle was destroyed by troops of Vogt Henry of Plauen and fell into ruin.

== Royal visit of 1805 ==
After Prussia had acquired the Margraviate of Bayreuth, its new rulers, King Frederick William III and Queen Louise visited Epprechtstein on 21 June 1805 with a large entourage. The stone table and stone benches, poetically called the Devil's Table (Teufelstisch), were specially built for the royal party to take luncheon. William III is said to have received the message that Napoleon I and his troops had crossed the Rhine whilst on the Epprechtstein.

== Epprechtstein granite labyrinth ==
In 2009 the town of Kirchenlamitz built a labyrinth of huge granite blocks at the foot of the mountain, near the village of Buchhaus.

== Sources ==
- Dietmar Herrmann: Lexikon Fichtelgebirge. Ackermann Verlag Hof/Saale.
- Werner Bergmann: 750 Jahre Burg Epprechtstein. Verlag der Stadt Kirchenlamitz/Ofr.
- Dr. Hans Vollet und Kathrin Heckel: Die Ruinenzeichnungen des Plassenburgkartographen Johann Christoph Stierlein. 1987.
- Dietmar Herrmann: Granitlabyrinth Epprechtstein, in: Der Siebenstern 2009, p. 344
