= Spielberg (Selb) =

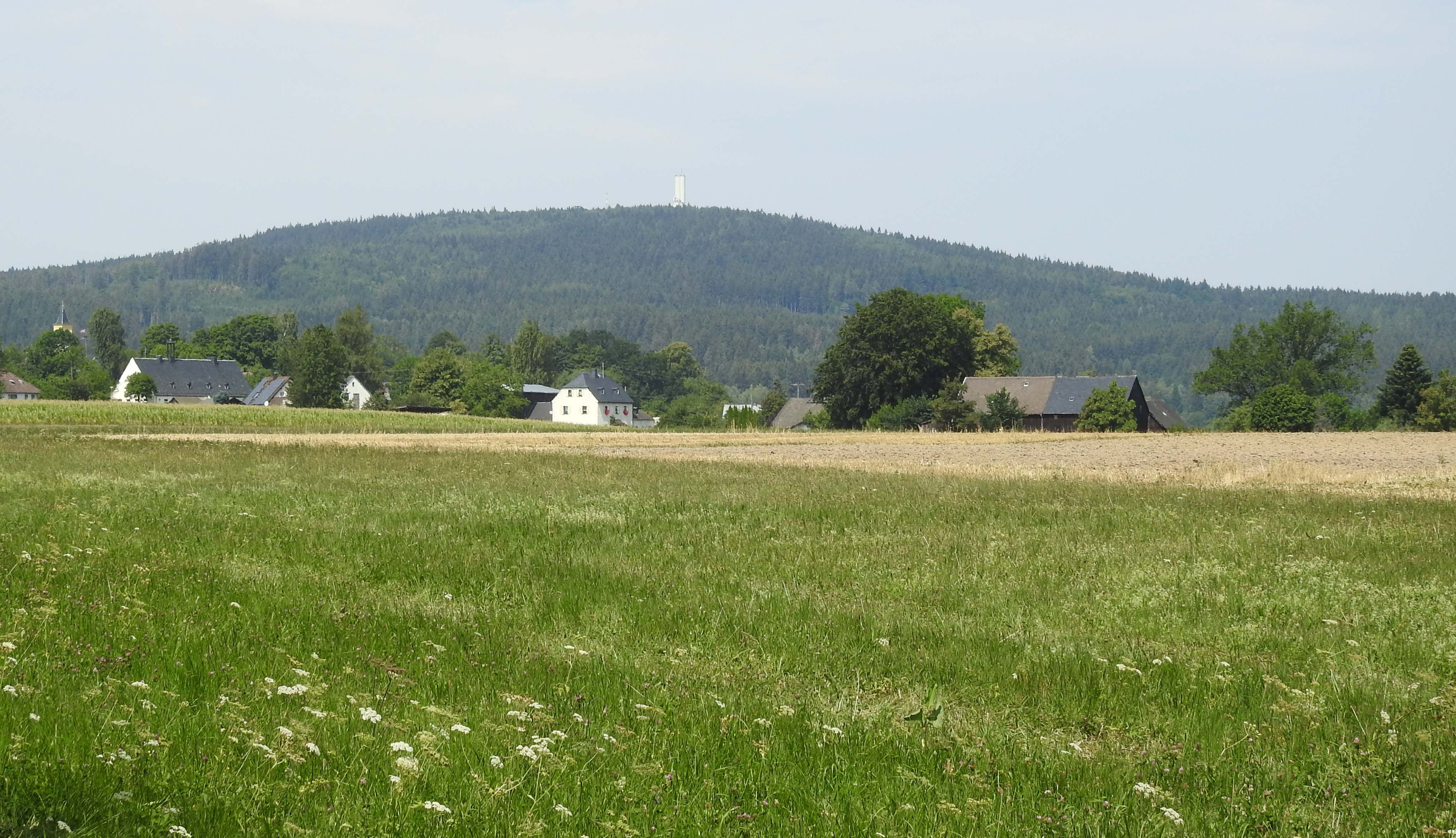
Spielberg from the southeast

Spielberg is a part of the town of Selb in the district of Wunsiedel in the Fichtel Mountains. Spielberg is located about seven kilometres west of the center of Selb at the foot of the Großer Kornberg. The border with the Czech Republic is about 15 kilometres to the east.

== History ==
The village was first mentioned in 1230 with the name "Spiegilberg", in 1275 it was mentioned under its present name. In 1618 and 1682 the village was ravaged by village fires. This also occurred in 1836. 21 houses, 35 outbuildings and the church fell victim to it. Until the ecclesiastical independence in 1846, Spielberg was an ecclesiastically divided village. One part belonged to the parish of Selb, another to Kirchenlamitz.

On 19 April 1945, three houses in Spielberg and the Selb train station were set on fire. The Americans advanced as far as Selb that day.

Spielberg belonged to the district of Rehau until 1972. After its dissolution, it became part of the district of Wunsiedel. On 1 January 1978, the hitherto independent municipality was incorporated into Selb.

== Transport ==
The state road 2179 from Selb to Marktleuthen passes directly past the village. Spielberg is connected to bus line 5 of the Verkehrsgemeinschaft Fichtelgebirge from Selb to Wunsiedel by two bus stops. The nearest train station is about five kilometres away in Marktleuthen on the railway line from Hof to Pegnitz.
