= Peter Schiller =

Peter Schiller may refer to:

- Peter Schiller (ice hockey) (1957–2020), German ice hockey player
- Peter Schiller (neuroscientist) (1931–2023), American neuroscientist
