= Dürrewiesen =

- Ortsteil of Selb
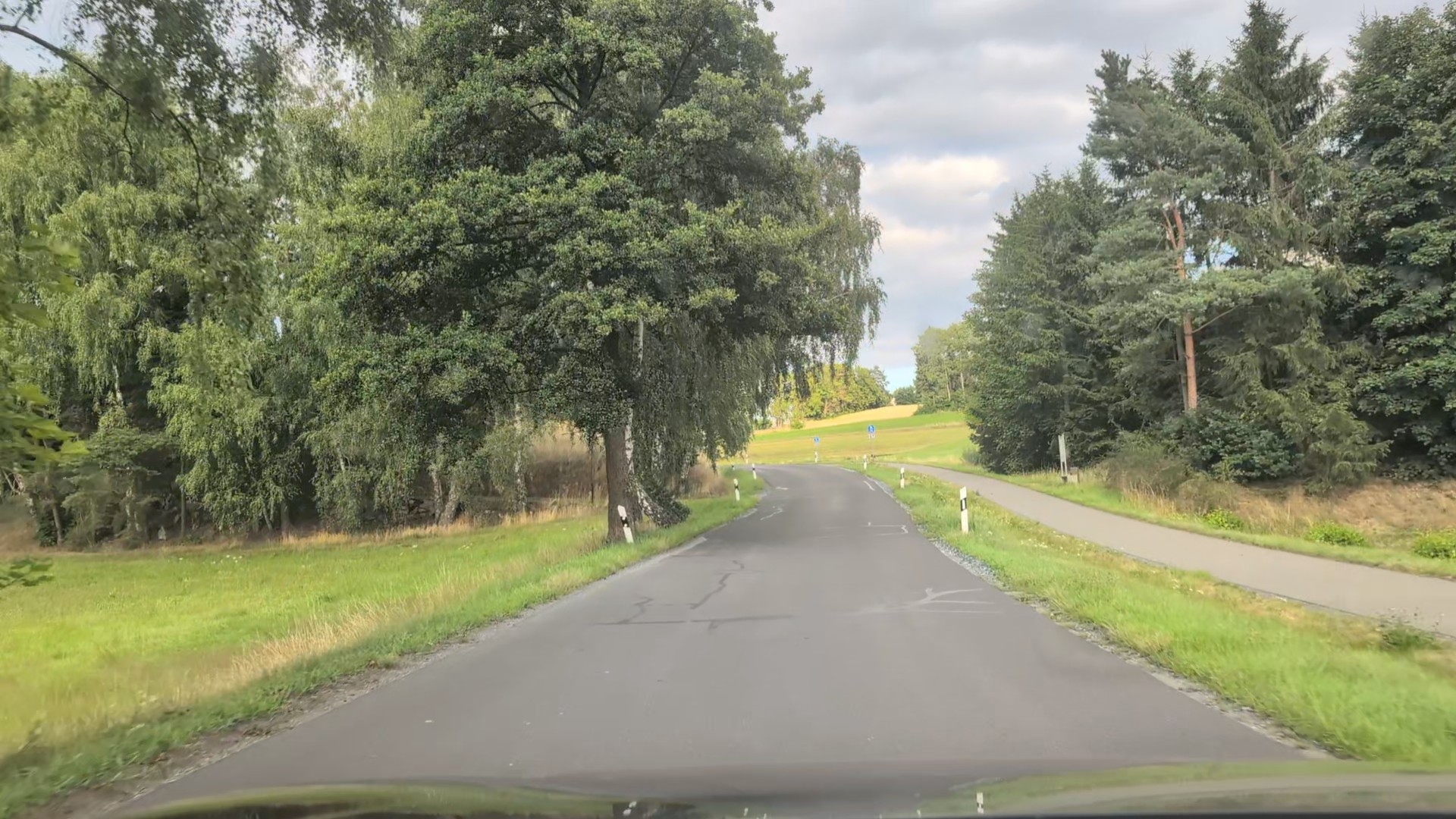
- Entering Dürrewiesen from the west on the Längenauer Straße
- Interactive map of Dürrewiesen
- Location within Germany Location within Bavaria
- Coordinates: 50.1759629°N 12.1783391°E
- Country: Germany
- State: Bavaria
- Admin. region: Upper Franconia
- District: Wunsiedel
- Town: Selb
- Elevation: 592 m (1,942 ft)
- Time zone: UTC+01:00 (CET)
  - Summer (DST): UTC+02:00 (CEST)
- Postal codes: 95100
- Dialling codes: 09287

Dürrewiesen lit. 'dry meadows' is a village in the large district city of Selb, in the Wunsiedel im Fichtelgebirge district of Bavaria, Germany.

== Geography ==
The village is located in the Eger valley, about 4 kilometres (2.5 mi) from the center of Selb, with which it is connected by the Längenauerstraße and Am Schreinersteich. The Bundesstraße 93 runs west of the village. Dürrewiesen near the German-Czech border, which is located 2 kilometres (1.2 mi) to the east.

== Infrastructure ==
The outdated sewage pumping station in the Dürrwiesen/Längenau area was renovated in 2007 at the cost of 111,000 EUR. Among other things, the switchgear was updated to meet the new explosion protection standards.
