= Waldstein (mountain range) =

Mountain range in Bavaria, Germany

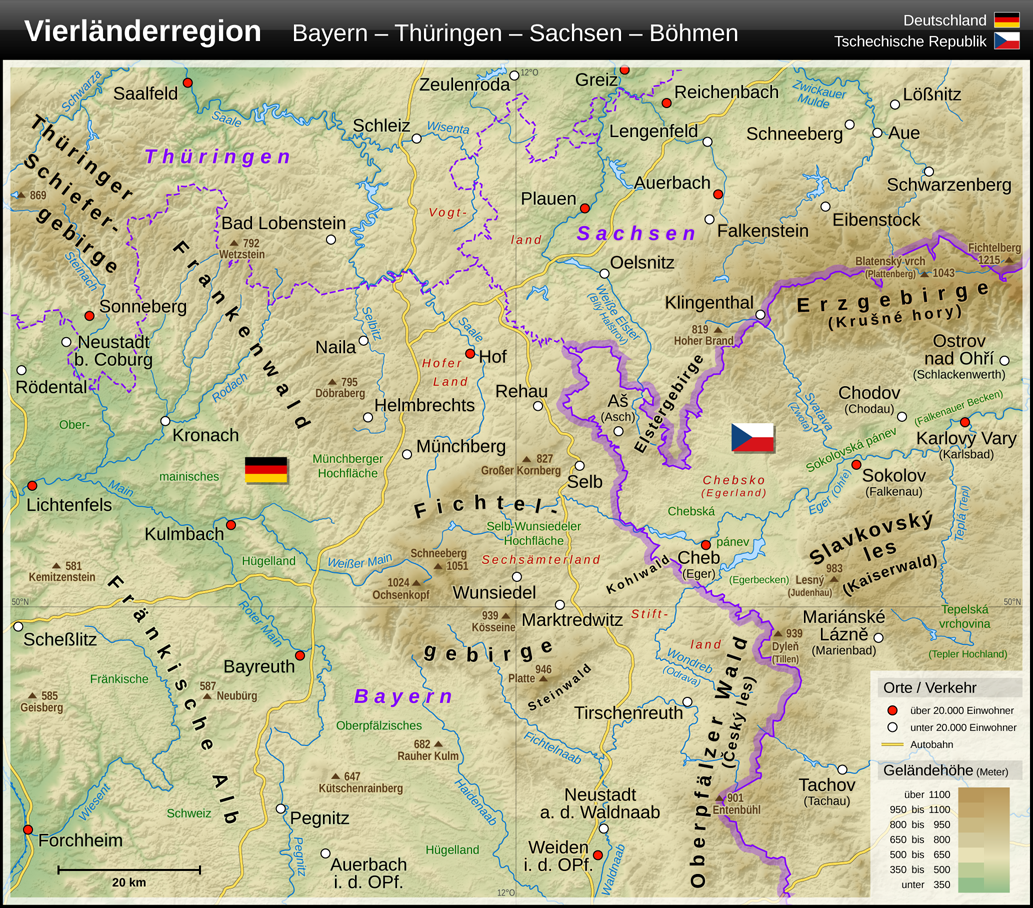
- The Fichtel mountains (Fichtelgebirge) in northeast Bavaria

Highest point
- Peak: Großer Waldstein
- Elevation: 877 m above NN

Geography
- State(s): Bavaria, Germany
- Range coordinates: 50°07′44″N 11°51′18″E

The Waldstein is a mountain range in the northern part of the Fichtel Mountains in Upper Franconia, Bavaria, in southern Germany.

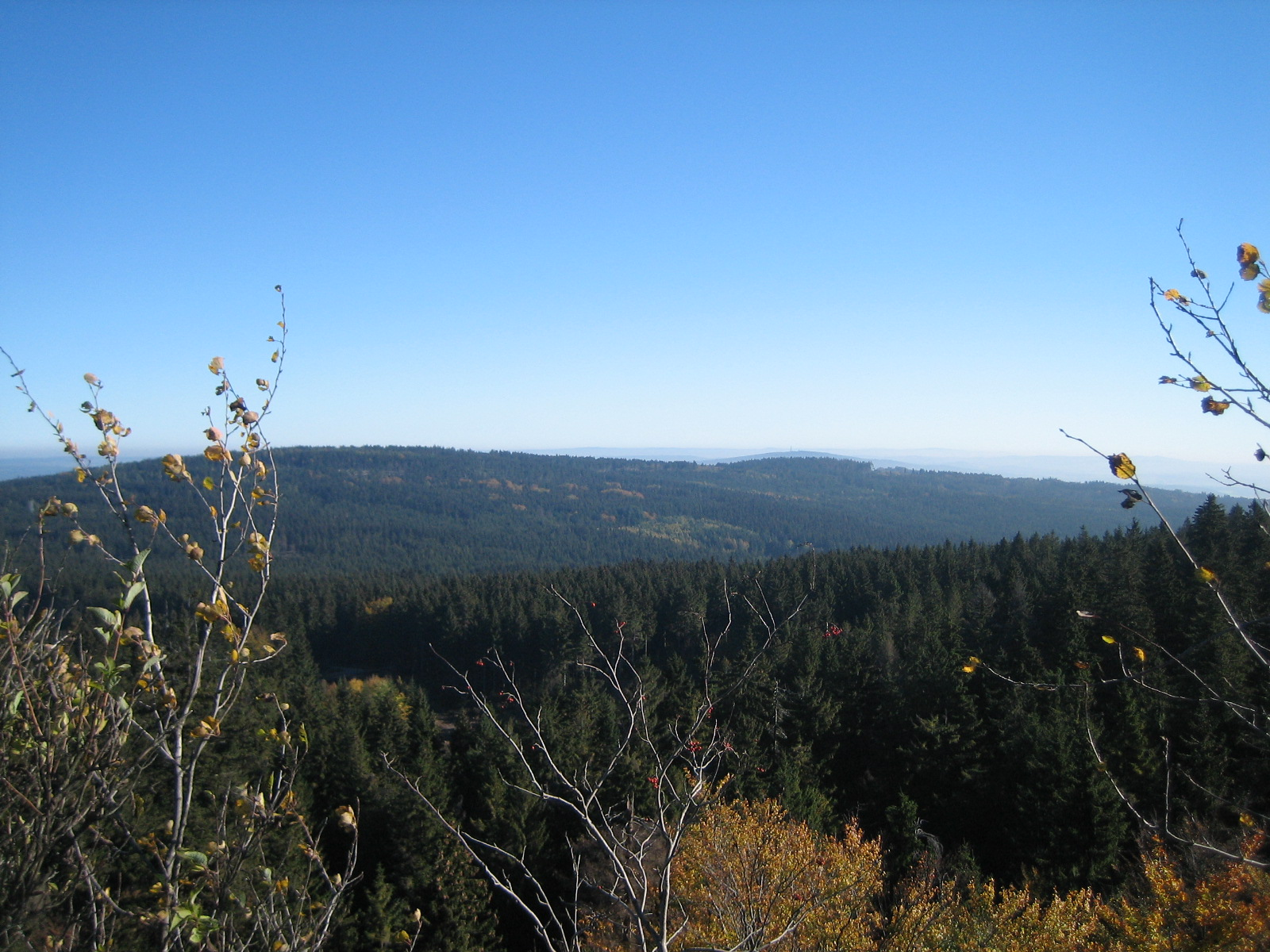
The Waldstein (looking northeast)

== Geography ==
Its highest elevation is the Großer Waldstein which is 877 metres (2,877 ft) high. In addition, the Epprechtstein, the Kleiner Waldstein and the ridge of the Hallerstein Forest, south of the town Hallerstein are all located in this mountain range. To the east the Großer Kornberg is the end of the mountain chain, while in the west it falls gently away at Gefrees.

== Geology ==
Geologically the massif consists mainly of granite. The history of its orogeny begins in the Precambrian about 750–800 million years ago – almost 20% of the earth's history. Only a few of these mountain stump ranges (Rumpfgebirge) remain today.

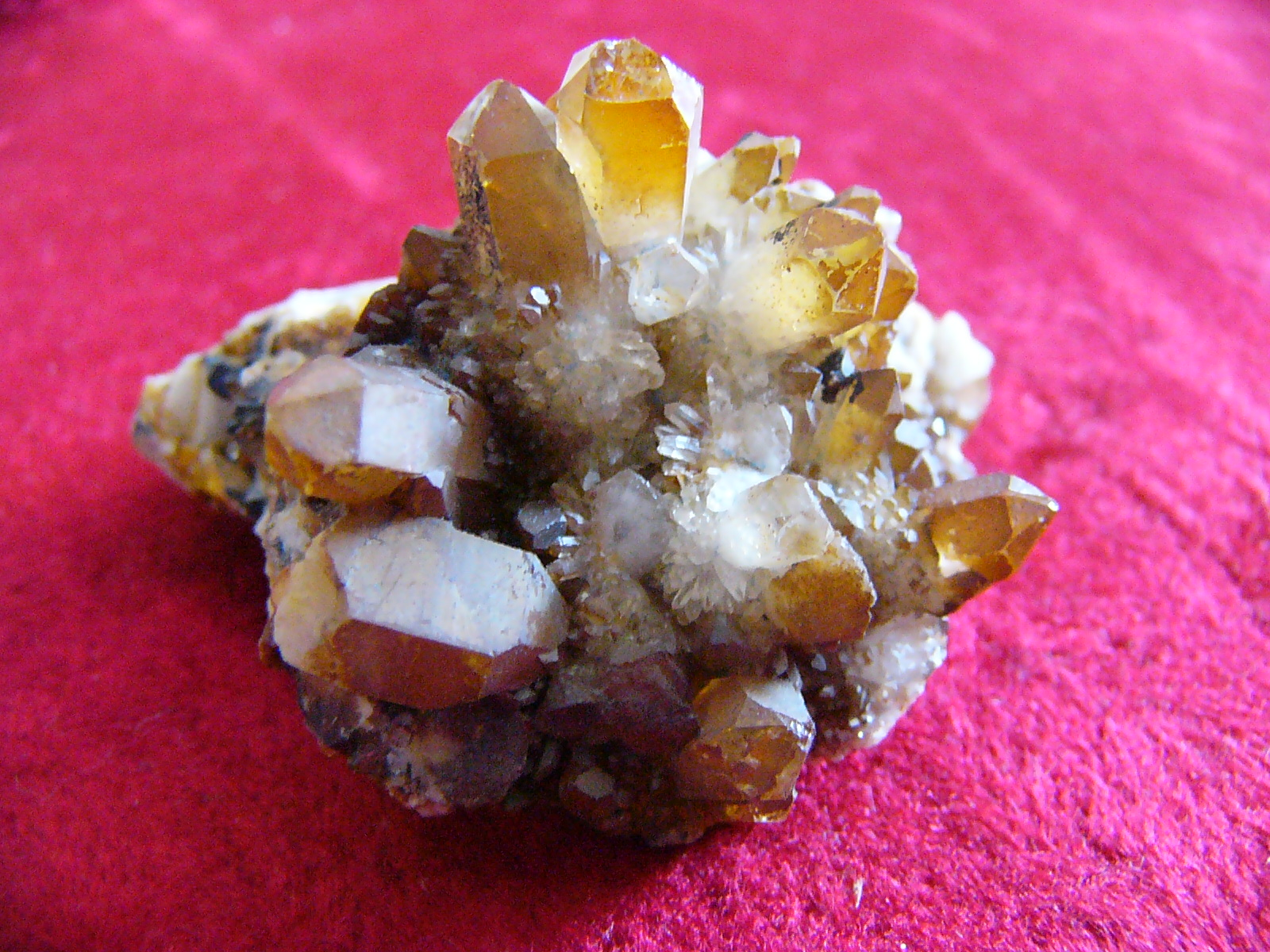
Crystal from the Waldstein

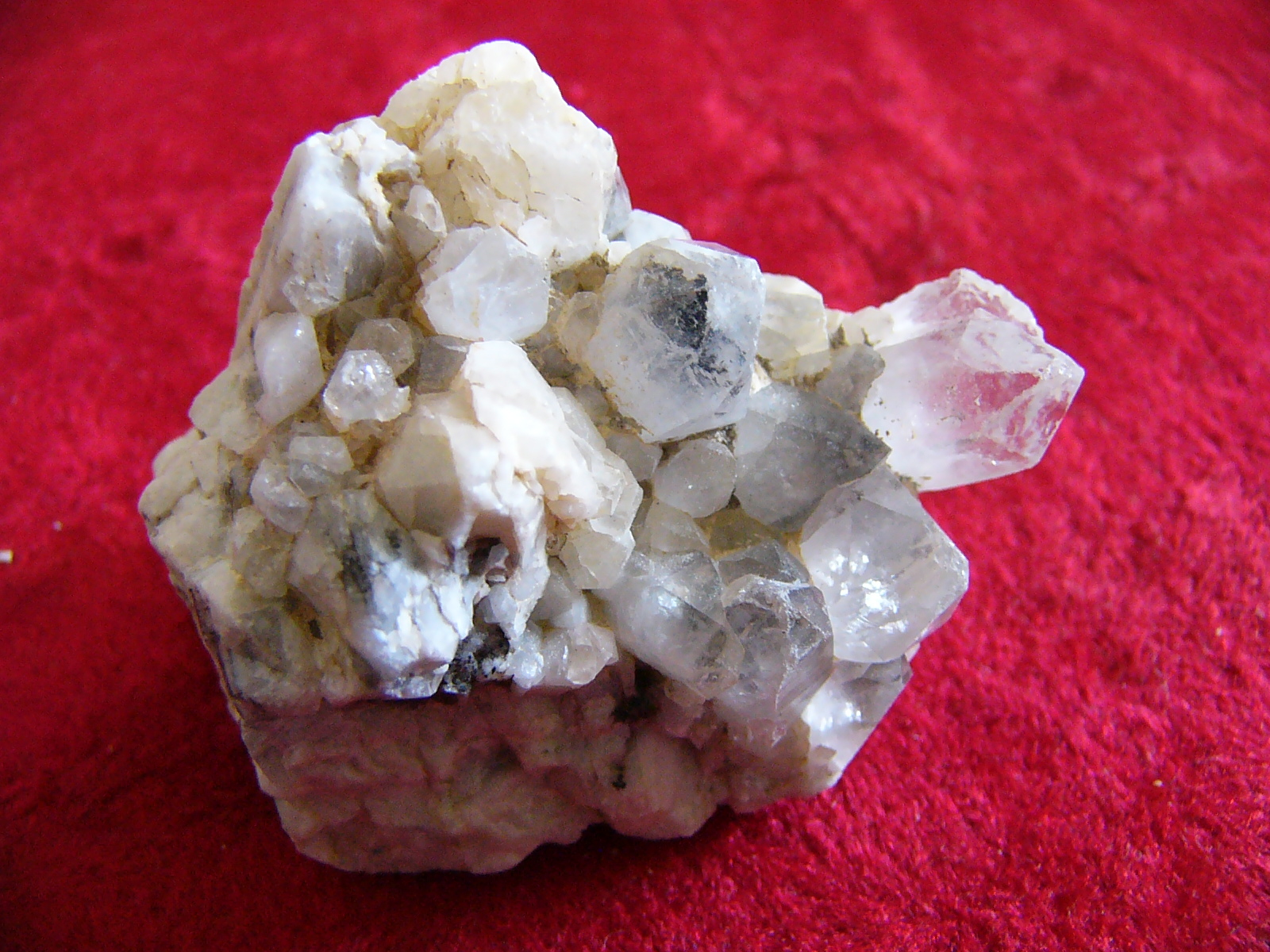
Mountain crystal or berg-crystal

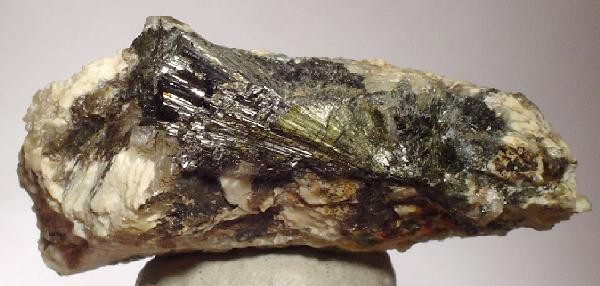
Tourmaline

== Language and settlement ==
The eastern part of the Waldstein ridge forms an approximate linguistic boundary between the East Franconian and Bavarian dialects, because settlement developed along the rivers rising in the Fichtel Mountains: the Saale, White Main Ohře and Fichtelnaab.

== Structures ==
On the Großen Waldstein is the Großer Waldstein transmitter. On the Epprechtstein are the ruins of Epprechtstein Castle.

== Maps ==
- Fritsch Wanderkarte 1:50,000 scale - Fichtelgebirge-Steinwald

== Gallery ==
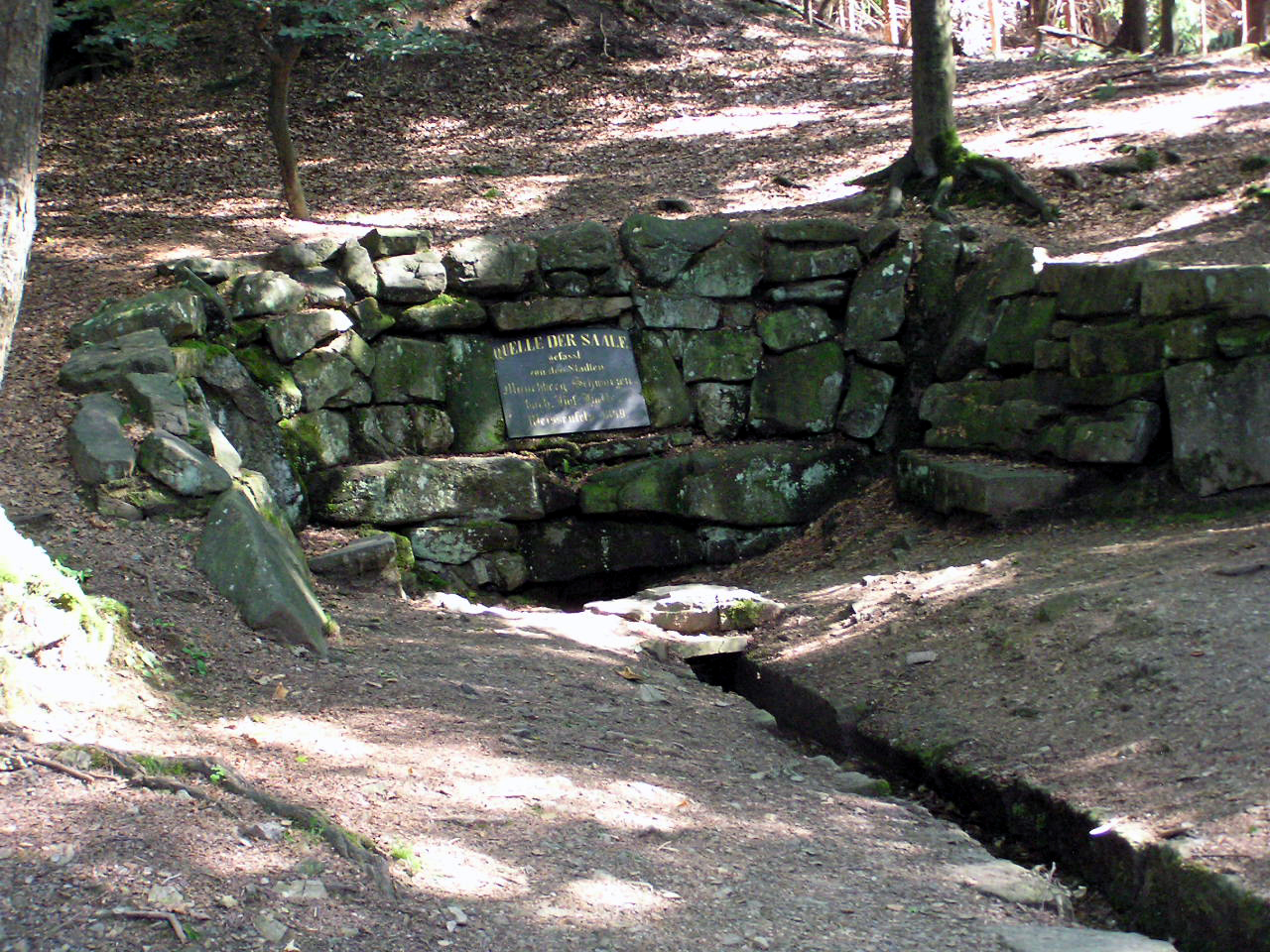
Source of the River Saale

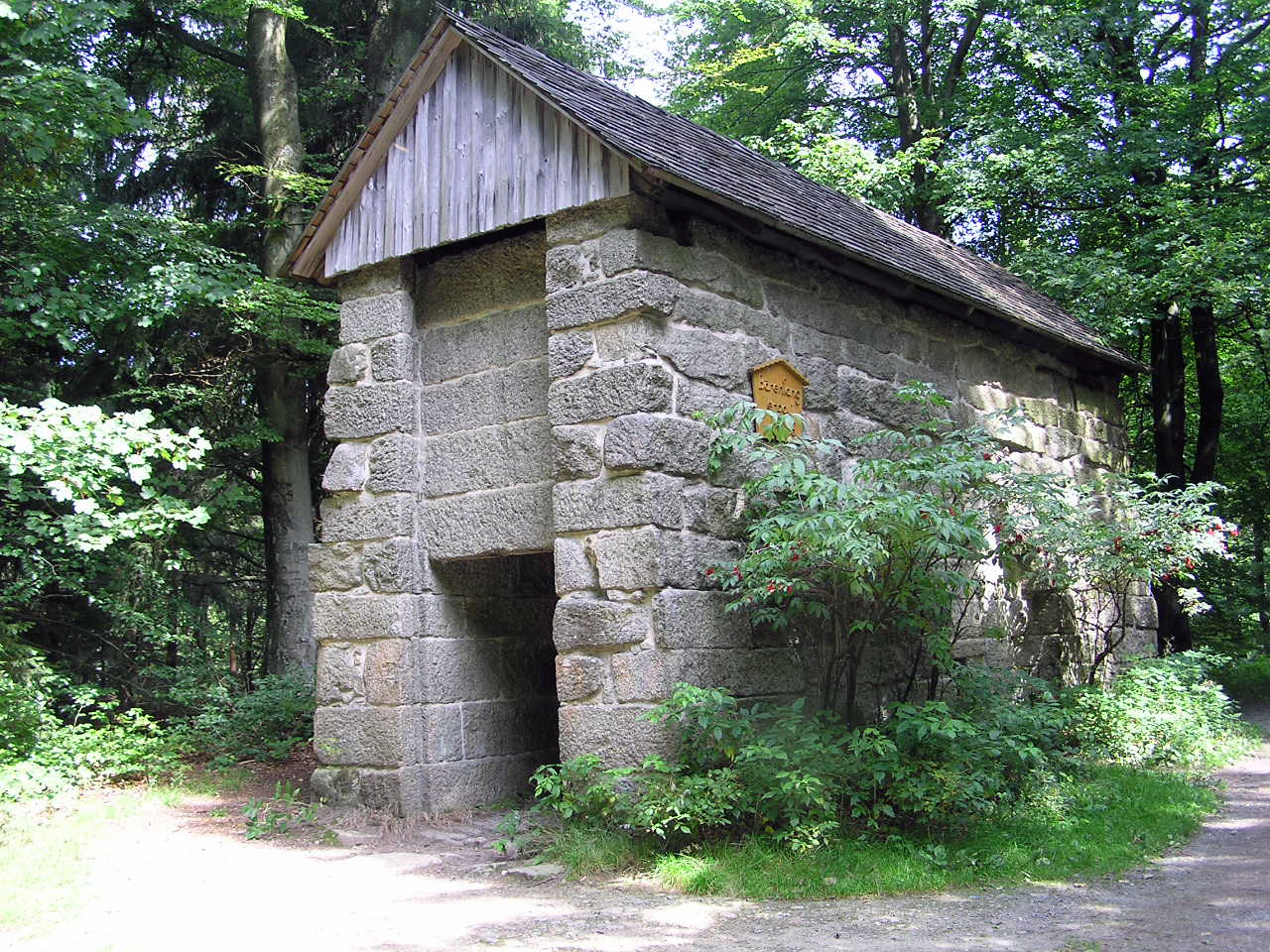
Bear trap in the Waldstein

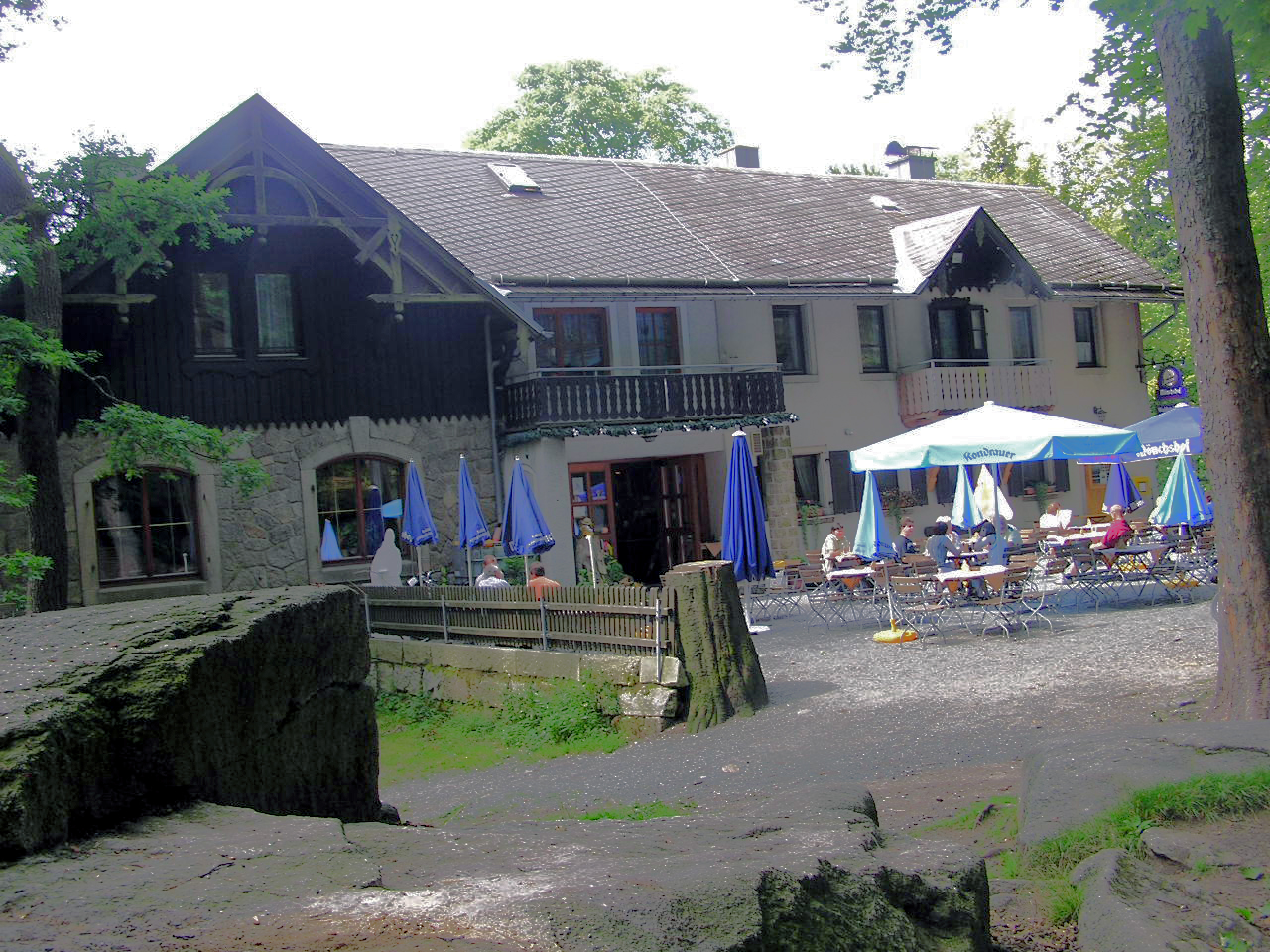
The Waldsteinhaus
