= Florian Ondruschka =

German ice hockey player and coach

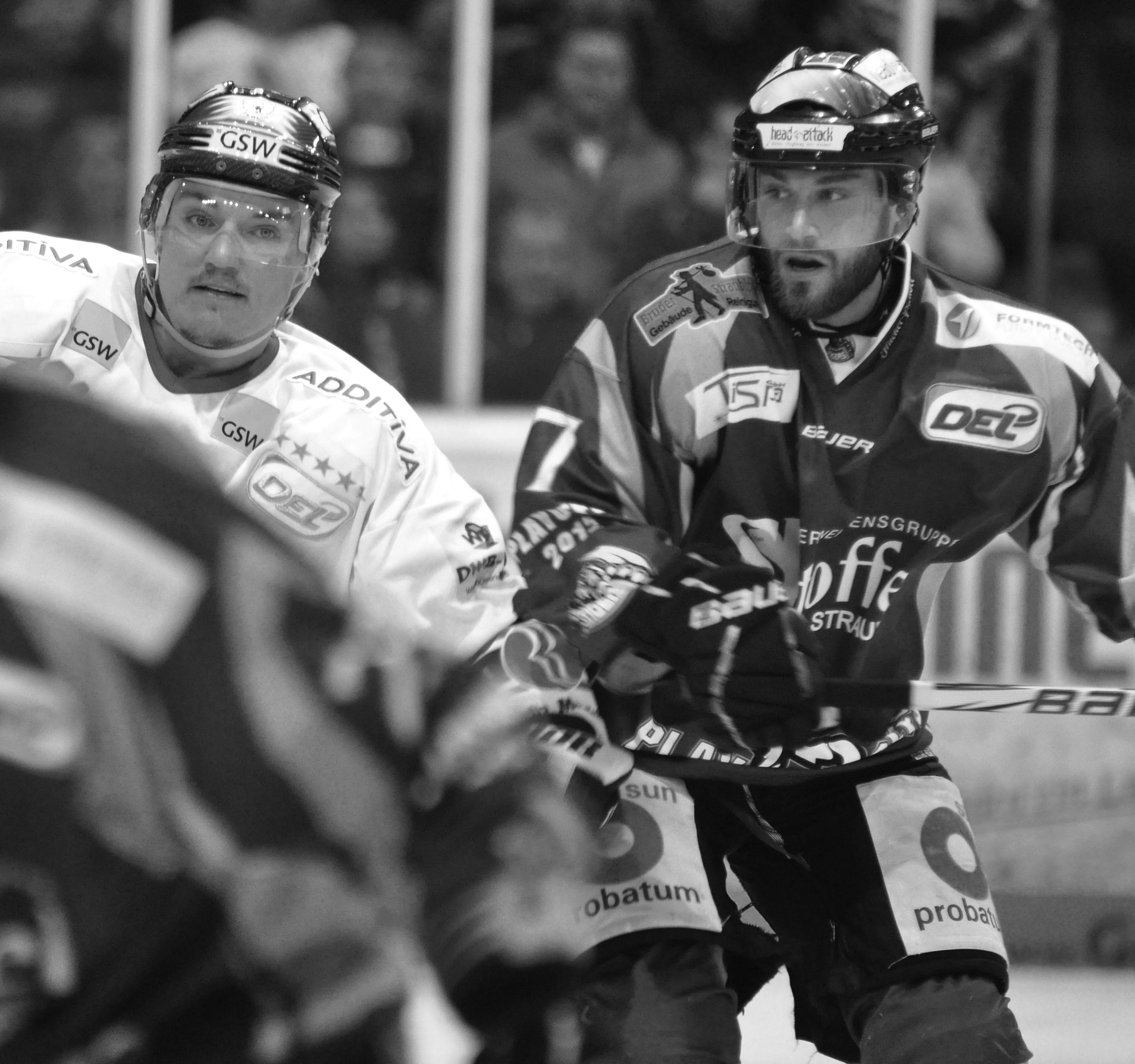
- Born: 24 June 1987 (age 37); Selb, West Germany
- Height: 185 cm (6 ft 1 in)
- Weight: 88 kg (194 lb; 13 st 12 lb)
- Position: Defence
- Shot: Left
- Played for: Blue Devils Weiden; Nürnberg Ice Tigers; Straubing Tigers; Selber Wölfe
- Current coach: Germany
- National team: Germany
- Playing career: 2005–2022
- Coaching career: 2022–present

Florian Ondruschka (born 24 June 1987) is a German ice hockey coach and former professional ice hockey defenceman, currently an assistant coach to the German women's national ice hockey team.

== Playing career ==
Ondruschka developed with the youth teams of ERC Selb in his hometown of Selb, in northeastern Bavaria, Germany. At age seventeen, he made his senior league debut with ERC Selb in the North-East (Nord-Ost) conference of the Oberliga.

He spent the 2004–05 season in Weiden in der Oberpfalz with 1. EV Weiden, playing with the club's team in the 2. Bundesliga, the Blue Devils Weiden. He also played one game with 1. EV Weiden U20 in the German Youth League (DNL).

Ahead of the 2005–06 season, he signed with the Nürnberg Ice Tigers in the Deutsche Eishockey Liga (DEL). He did not record a point across fourteen games with the Ice Tigers and played most of the season with the Weiden Blue Devils.

The following three seasons were played entirely with the Nurnbürg Ice Tigers. His first DEL goal was scored during the 2008–09 season.

Ondruschka signed with the Straubing Tigers ahead of the 2010–11 season. He played six seasons with the Straubing Tigers and recorded his most offensively productive DEL season in 2013–14, during which he notched 3 goals and 9 assists for 12 points in 52 games.

The Straubing Tigers did not offer a contract extension after the 2015–16 season and Ondruschka chose to return to his hometown. His youth club, ERC Selb, had been replaced by VER Selb in 2004 and he joined the VER Selb team in the Oberliga, called the Selber Wölfe (lit. 'Wolves of Selb').

Named captain of the Selber Wölfe in 2016, he led the team to an Oberliga championship title and promotion to the DEL2 in 2021. Ondruschka announced his retirement from playing after the 2021–22 DEL2 season, in which the Wölfe successfully retained their place in the league.

=== International play ===
Ondruschka represented Germany at the 2004 tournament of Hockey Canada's World Under-17 Hockey Challenge, recording 3 assists in five games.

As a member of the German men's national under-18 ice hockey team, he participated in the 2004 IIHF World U18 Championship Division I and the 2005 IIHF World U18 Championship.

With the German men's national under-20 ice hockey team, he played in the 2006 World Junior Ice Hockey Championship Division I and served as team captain in the 2000 World Junior Ice Hockey Championship.

Ondruschka made his senior national team debut in a friendly against Switzerland in December 2007. He was a member of the national team during 2007 to 2013 and played in the 2012 IIHF World Championship in Sweden.

== Coaching career ==
Ondruschka was announced as an assistant coach to Thomas Schädler, head coach of the German women's national ice hockey team, in August 2022. He has served in role for the 2022 IIHF Women's World Championship, the 2022–23 Women's Euro Hockey Tour, and the 2023 IIHF Women's World Championship, as of April 2023.

== Personal life ==
Ondruschka was born on 24 June 1987 in Selb, West Germany.

He and his wife, Julia, were married in 2017 and have one child.
