= House of Wild =

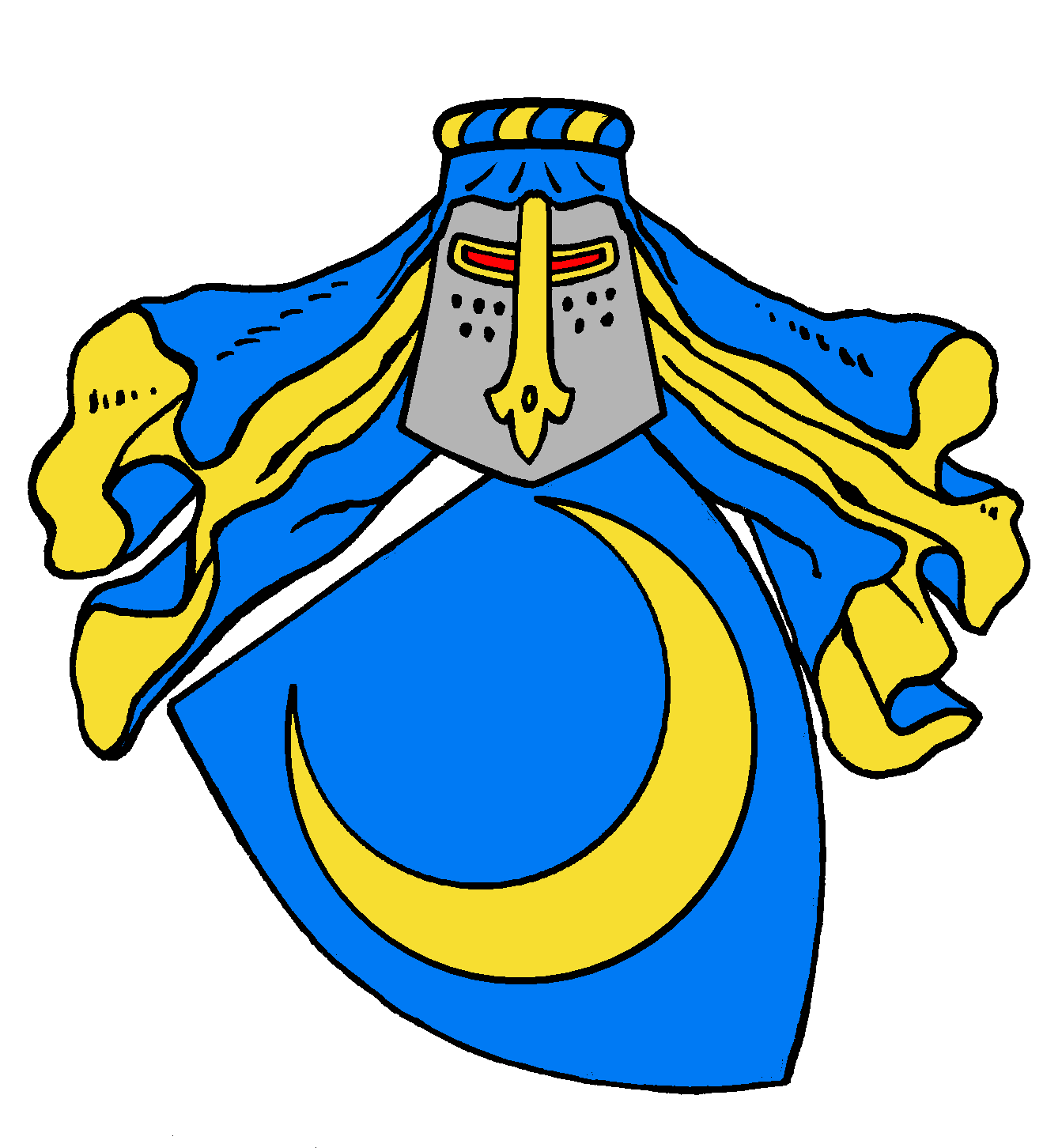
Wild family coat of arms

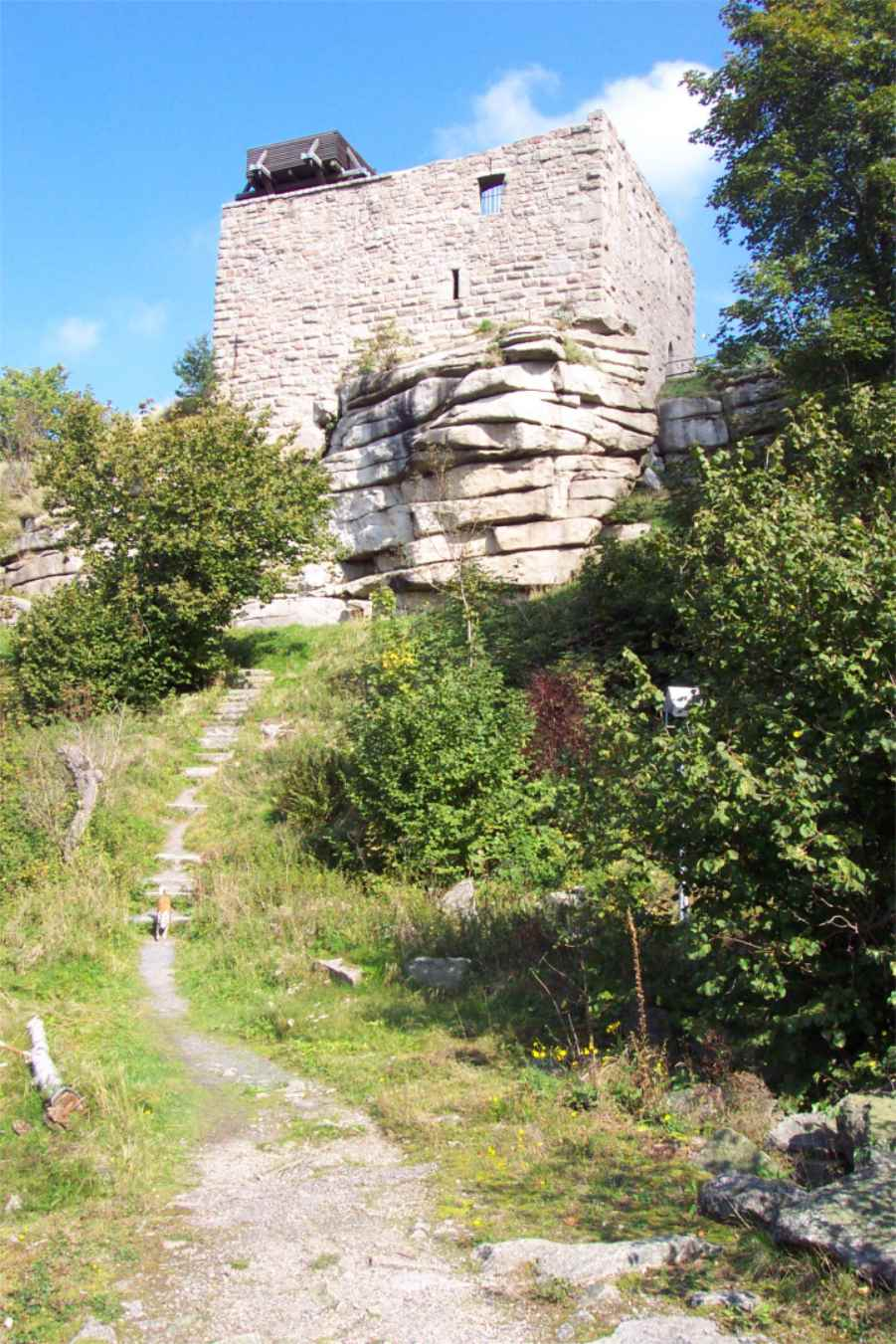
The ruins of Epprechtstein Castle near Kirchenlamitz

The House of Wild was a Saxon noble family that also lived in parts of Franconia, southern Germany.

== History ==
The Sack and Wild nobility were enfeoffed with Epprechtstein Castle in the 14th century.

The two families became vagabonds and robber knights, taking merchants hostage, mainly from Eger, and would only release them for a ransom. As a result, they attracted the attention of the burgraves of Nuremberg who attacked them because their raids were affecting their territorial politics. In 1352, they stormed the castle in order to seize it and hold it as a fief. In 1355/1356 the burgraves purchased the entire estate of the castle, the Amt and the parish of Kirchenlamitz.

The coat of arms of the House of Wild is a gold crescent on a blue field.

== Literature ==
- Archiv für die Geschichte von Oberfranken, Vol. 9, Issue 3, 1863.
- Werner Bergmann: 750 Jahre Burg Epprechtstein. Weißenstadt, 1998. pp. 46–59.
