= Sebastian Bösel =

German footballer

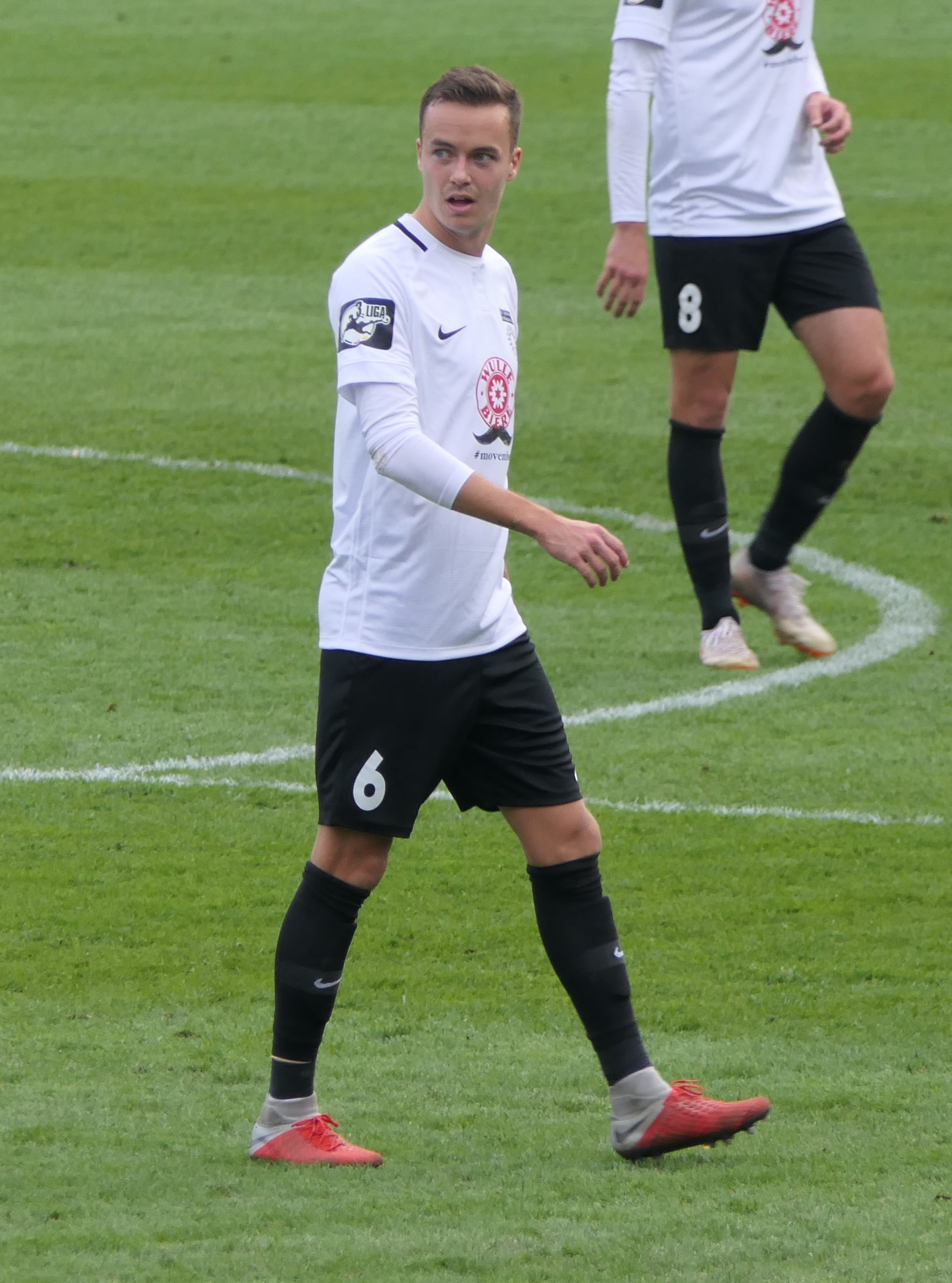
- Bösel in 2018

Personal information
- Date of birth: 24 October 1994 (age 32)
- Place of birth: Selb, Germany
- Height: 1.80 m (5 ft 11 in)
- Position: Midfielder

Youth career
- 1. FC Marktleuthen
- Greuther Fürth
- –2012: Bayern Hof

Senior career*
Years	Team	Apps	(Gls)
2012–2014	Bayern Hof	64	(4)
2014–2017	Bayern Munich II	65	(0)
2017–2020	Sonnenhof Großaspach	95	(1)
2020–2022	1. FC Saarbrücken	12	(0)
2022	Hallescher FC	7	(0)
- * Club domestic league appearances and goals

Sebastian Bösel (born 24 October 1994) is a German former professional footballer who played as a midfielder.
