= Manfred Ahne =

German ice hockey player

Personal information
- Nationality: West Germany
- Born: 2 June 1961 (age 63); Selb, West Germany
- Height: 1.74 m (5 ft 9 in)
- Weight: 77 kg (170 lb)

Sport
- Sport: Ice hockey

Manfred Ahne (born 2 June 1961) is a West German ice hockey player. He competed in the 1984 Winter Olympics.
