= Peter Schiller (ice hockey) =

German ice hockey player (1957–2020)

Personal information
- Nationality: German
- Born: 29 June 1957; Selb, West Germany
- Died: 22 May 2020 (aged 62); Berlin, Germany

Sport
- Sport: Ice hockey

Peter Schiller (29 June 1957 – 22 May 2020) was a German ice hockey player. He competed in the men's tournament at the 1988 Winter Olympics.
