= Langnau =

There are several municipalities and communities have the name Langnau in Switzerland:

- Langnau am Albis, in the canton of Zürich
  - Langnau-Gattikon railway station in Langnau am Albis
- Langnau bei Reiden, in the canton of Lucerne
- Langnau im Emmental, in the canton of Bern
  - Langnau i.E. railway station in Langnau im Emmental
- Langnau bei Märwil, in Affeltrangen municipality, canton of Thurgau
