= Längenau =

- Ortsteil of Selb
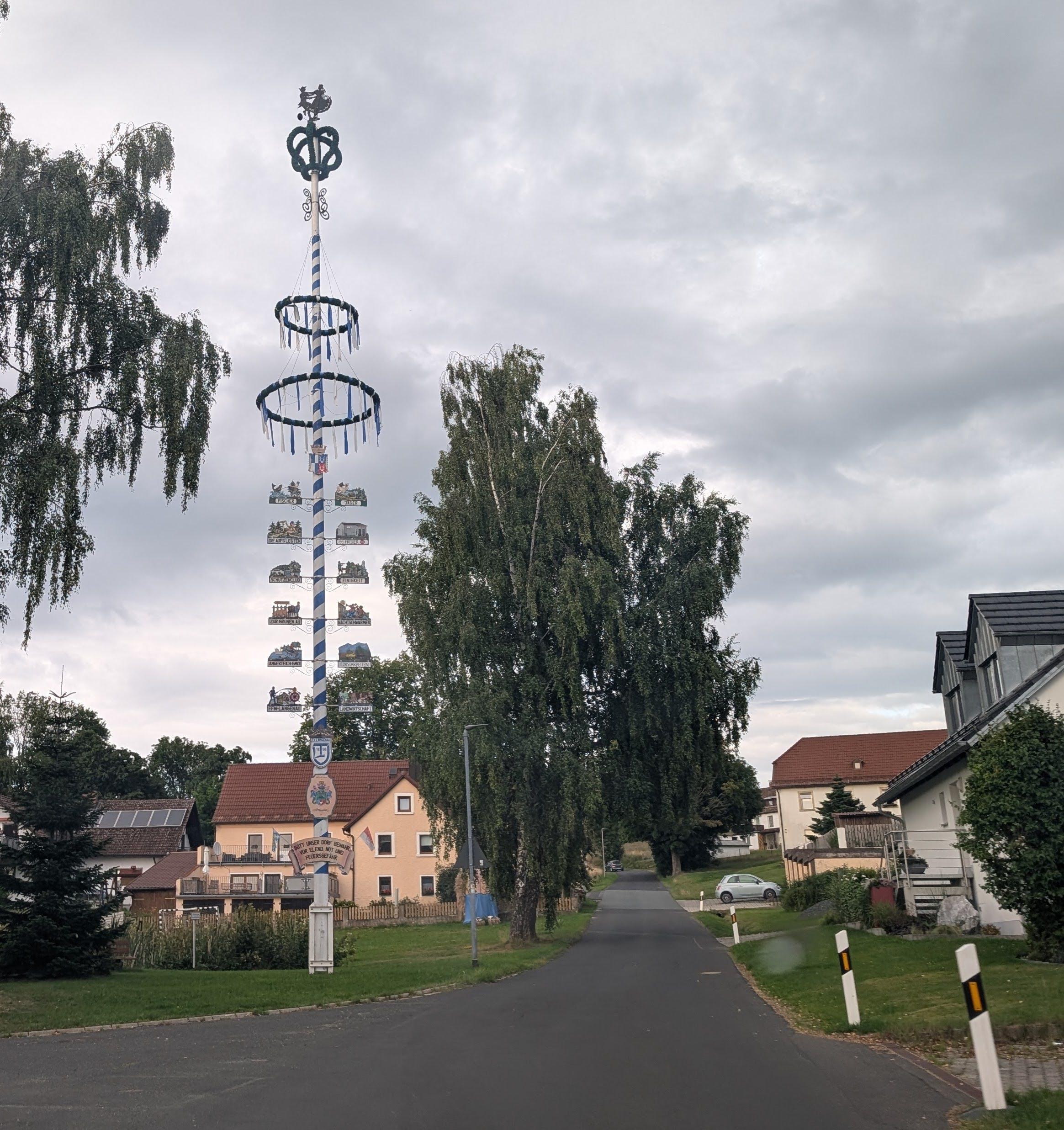
- Längenau
- Interactive map of Längenau
- Location within Germany Location within Bavaria
- Coordinates: 50°10′45″N 12°11′15″E
- Country: Germany
- State: Bavaria
- Admin. region: Upper Franconia
- District: Wunsiedel
- City: Selb
- Time zone: UTC+01:00 (CET)
  - Summer (DST): UTC+02:00 (CEST)
- Postal codes: 95100

Längenau is a village in the large district city of Selb, in the Wunsiedel im Fichtelgebirge district of Bavaria, Germany.

== Geography ==
The village is located 4 kilometres (2.5 mi) east of Selb, by the mountains Wartberg and Oppersbühl. It is within the Selb-Wunsiedler Plateau natural region of the Fichtel Mountains.

== History ==
The village was first mentioned in a document under the name "Lengenowe". Around 1368, it belonged to the Asch estate of the Zedtwitz family, but in 1417 it was taken away from its owners. In 1499, the Margraviate of Brandenburg-Kulmbach-Bayreuth held feudal estates in the village, while most of the farms belonged to the nobile family of Raitenbach of Erkersreuth. The Forster family from Selb and Jobst Neustetter also held fiefs there. In 1818, the municipality of Längenau and Buchwald was created. The patrimonial court was held by the Reitzenstein family of Erkersreuth. Since 1928, basalt has been mined at the nearby Wartberg for use as crushed stone in road construction. On January 1, 1978, the town became a part of the municipality of Selb.

== Notable Places ==
There are several notable housebarns in the village. The three- and four-sided farms are classified as architectural monuments. In front of the restaurant Zum Wartberg is an old, protected border stone witih the coat of arms of the Margraviate of Bayreuth. On the mountain Wartberg, there was previously a watchtower from the same period. Multiple border stones with several different coats of arms are located along the border with Czechia at Höllrangen. A piece of rock with a weathered hollow, known as Schüsselstein (bowl stone) has two carved square depressions and crosses, and formerly bore the year "1848" and the inscriptions "Kgr. Bayern und Kgr. Böhmen", meaning "Kingdom of Bavaria and Kingdom of Bohemia".

== Tourism ==
Along the Czech border to the east runs the "Ostweg" trail of the Fichtelgebirge Club, a local hiking club. A signed branch trail leads to the Schüsselstein and to border stones with the coat of arms of the Lords of Lindenfels and Zedtwitz. The 6 kilometres (3.7 mi) long Bankerlweg (bench path) leads around Oppersbühl and Wartberg. The Bavaria-Bohemia Bridge Bike Path passes through Längenau. On the peak of Wartberg is a campsite, situated at the location of a former Luftwaffe radar station for air surveillance of Czechoslovakia.
