= Dolní Lánov =

- Municipality
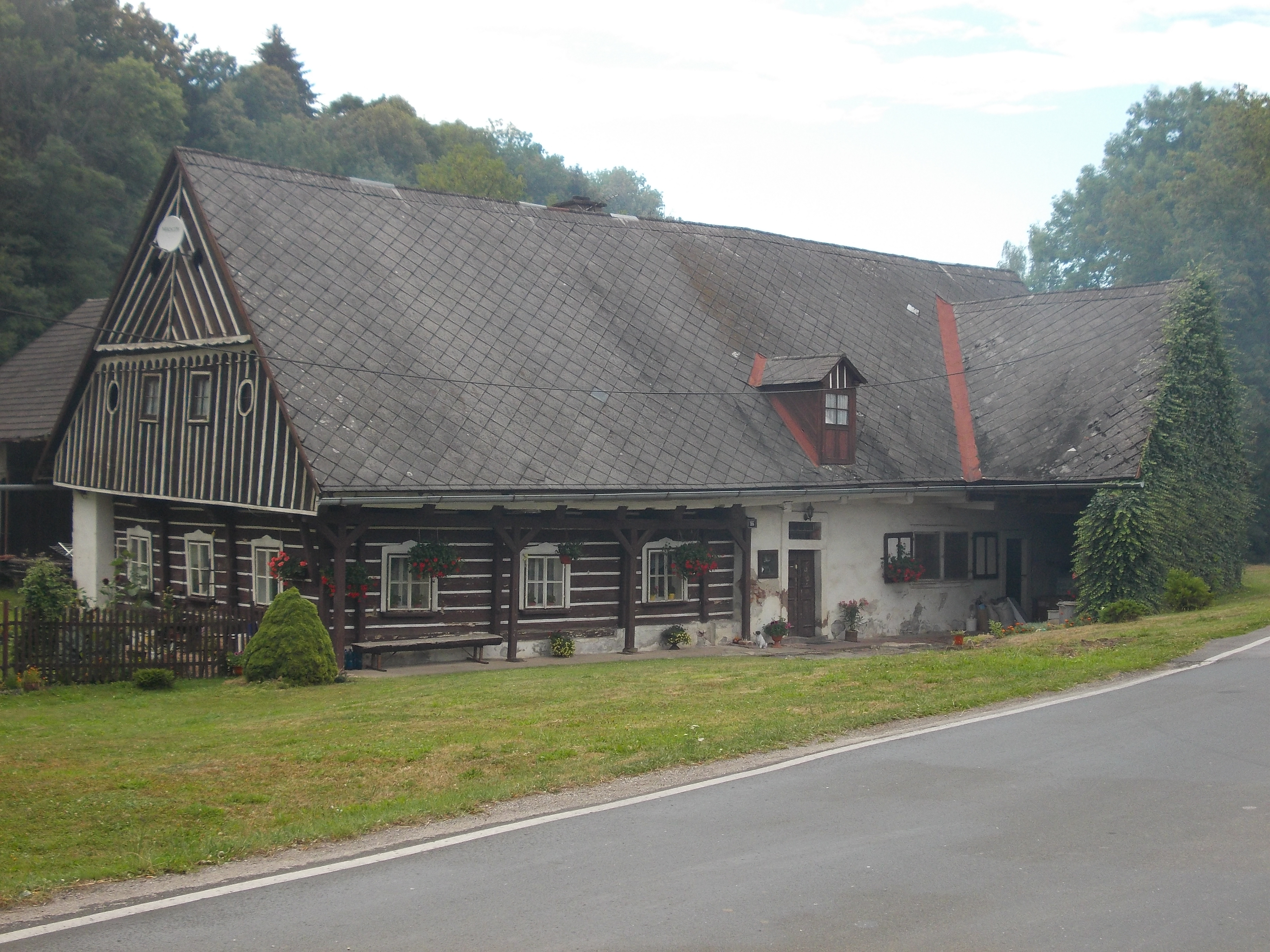
- A log house typical of the region

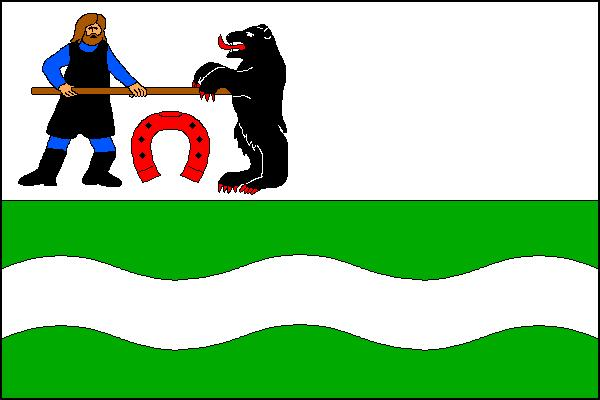
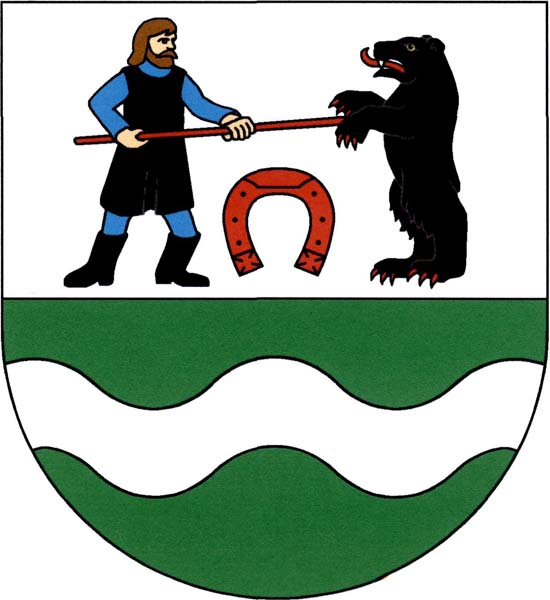
- Flag Coat of arms

- Location in the Czech Republic
- Coordinates: 50°35′13″N 15°39′52″E
- Country: Czech Republic
- Region: Hradec Králové
- District: Trutnov
- First mentioned: 1359

Area
  - Total: 15.77 km^{2} (6.09 sq mi)
- Elevation: 426 m (1,398 ft)

Population (2026-01-01)
  - Total: 839
  - Density: 53.2/km^{2} (138/sq mi)
- Time zone: UTC+1 (CET)
  - Summer (DST): UTC+2 (CEST)
- Postal code: 543 41
- Website: www.dolnilanov.cz

Dolní Lánov (German: Nieder Langenau) is a municipality and village in Trutnov District in the Hradec Králové Region of the Czech Republic. It has about 800 inhabitants.

== Demographics ==
Historical population
Year	Pop.	±%
1869	1,796	—
1880	1,988	+10.7%
1890	2,081	+4.7%
1900	1,961	−5.8%
1910	1,929	−1.6%
1921	1,640	−15.0%
1930	1,582	−3.5%
1950	724	−54.2%
1961	870	+20.2%
1970	776	−10.8%
1980	642	−17.3%
1991	634	−1.2%
2001	668	+5.4%
2011	769	+15.1%
2021	788	+2.5%
Source: Censuses
