= Großer Kornberg =

- Former Army surveillance tower on the mountain

Highest point
- Elevation: 827 m above sea level (NN) (2,713 ft)
- Coordinates: 50°10′59″N 12°01′16″E

Geography
- Location within Bavaria
- Location: Bavaria, Germany
- Parent range: Fichtel Mountains

Geology
- Rock age: Hercynian
- Mountain type: Granite

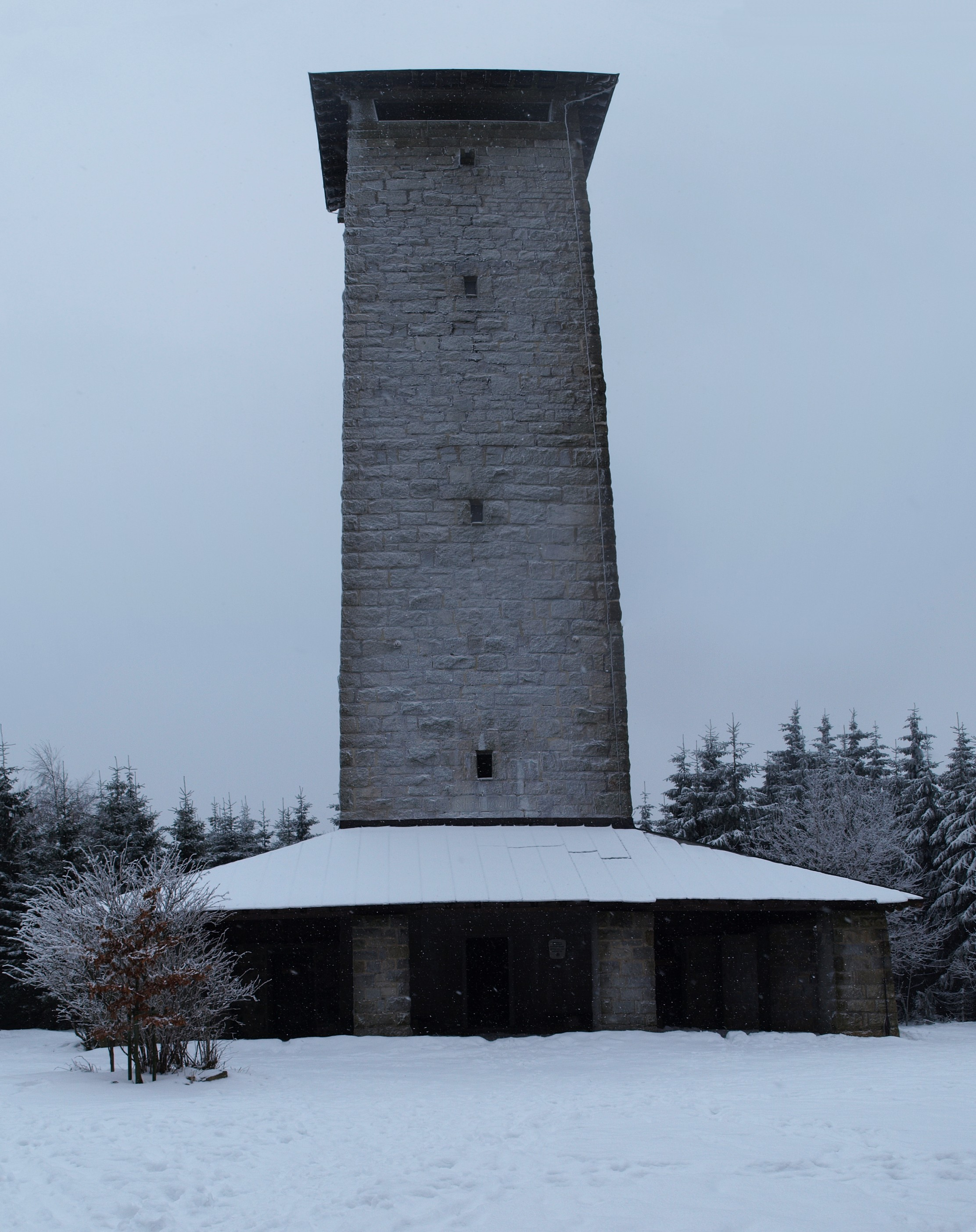
Schönburg Watchtower

With its 827-metre-high (2,713 ft) peak the Große Kornberg is the northeast cornerstone of the Fichtel Mountains in south Germany. It forms a wooded ridge, which is recognisable from a long distance by its former military surveillance tower It is also the local 'house' mountain of Schönwald and Schwarzenbach an der Saale.

Geologically, granite is the underlying rock. Its lower strata are grainy, but the upper layers contain fine-grained granite. Abandoned quarries are evidence of the ancient craft of stonemasons.

The oldest known document dates to 1317 and refers to the mountain as the Kurnberg. According to Professor Dr. Adolf Gütter, in Middle High German Kurn means 'mill', so it meant 'mill mountain'. On its northwest slopes there was once a village called Mühlhausen but it had been abandoned by the end of the 14th century.

The Kornberg itself lacks the imposing rock towers and felsenmeer terrain typical of other mountain peaks in the Fichtelgebirge. However, its secondary summit, the Hirschstein, has many steep, sometimes vertical, rock towers which made the location attractive to the medieval castle of the same name, of which now only a few remnants are left. Moreover, the mountain offers other attractions for the traveller: the Gypsy Rocks (Zigeunersteine) with its logan stone (Wackelstein), and the Schönburg Watchtower (Schönburgwarte) with its good views. In winter the lifts are used by skiers.

== The Schönburg Tower ==
The tower opened in 1954 is not the first structure to have stood on the Kornberg. In autumn 1849, a 70-foot-high (21 m) wooden tower with stone base was erected by master carpenter, Ulrich Hallmeyer from Kirchenlamitz, to assist in topographical surveys. 20 men worked for two weeks to build the tower, which cost 460 Gulden. When it fell into ruin, the Fichtelgebirge Section of the German-Austrian Alpine Club (forerunner of the Fichtelgebirge Club) In 1885 a 23-metre-high wooden observation tower (designed by engineer (Baurat) Winnerling of Wunsiedel; executed by master carpenter, Böhringer of Wunsiedel; cost 626 marks; opened on 2 August 1885).

The site and the wood required were donated by Princ Ernest of Schönburg-Waldenburg, which is why the structure was given the name Schönburgwarte (Schönburg Watchtower). In March 1897 this wooden tower collapsed, but before the year was out the Fichtelgebirge Club (FGV) decided to build a stone tower. In 1898 the town engineer (Stadtbaurat), Thomas, from Hof, began the planning. Donations were collected, the Alpine Club section of Asch contributing 365 marks and the Vogtländische Tourist Association, 100 marks. Master engineer Luding from Pilgramsreuth was given the contract to build the 19.2-metre-high structure which cost 7,800 marks.

On 24 June 1900 the circular stone structure was opened to the public in festive style. It was only a short time, however, before renovation work was needed, because the tower showed serious cracks and had to be reinforced with iron rings. In 1930 part of the battlements had fallen down and the internal staircase had to be repaired. There was not a single year when the Schönburgwarte did not incur repair costs. In 1936 a technical inspection came to the conclusion that the Kornberg tower would have to be replaced due to its dilapidation. On 4 December 1938 the circular tower was demolished for safety reasons. Several months before its demolition the Fichtelgebirge Club began planning a replacement, the Adolf Hitler Tower. However, plans for an early replacement came to nothing as a result of the Second World War.

On 30 August 1952 an Association for the Rebuilding of the Kornberg Tower (Verein zum Wiederaufbau des Kornbergturmes) was founded, the funding for the new tower amassed, so that the summit of the Kornberg could once again become a viewing tower. On 23 August 1953 work started (planning: Oberstadtbaurat i. R. Rudorf from Hof; execution: Augsten & Scheuerlein of Hof) On 10 October 1954 about 4000 walkers gathered for the ceremony and the opening of the tower to the public. The rectangular tower with a total height of 26 m and 114 stone steps, cost 62,000 DM, which was found from donations and grants.

On 31 May 1959 the Schönburgwarte was officially handed over to the Fichtelgebirge Club when the rebuilding association was disbanded. The surrounding club branches of Marktleuthen, Niederlamitz, Rehau, Schönwald, Schwarzenbach an der Saale, Selb and Selb-Plößberg took over the care of the tower. In 1960 members of the Niederlamitz branch with the support of the firm of Reul-Granit a stone panorama pointer was added to the tower parapet. By the entrance side on the inside of the tower is a large stone tablet with the data on the tower. In 1964, on the 10th anniversary of the tower, it was given a "tower ghost". This is a small man carved in granite, which is located in the tower entrance and carries the inscription "The tower ghost thanks you for your donation" ("Der Turmgeist dankt für Deine Spende").

== Ruins of Hirschstein ==
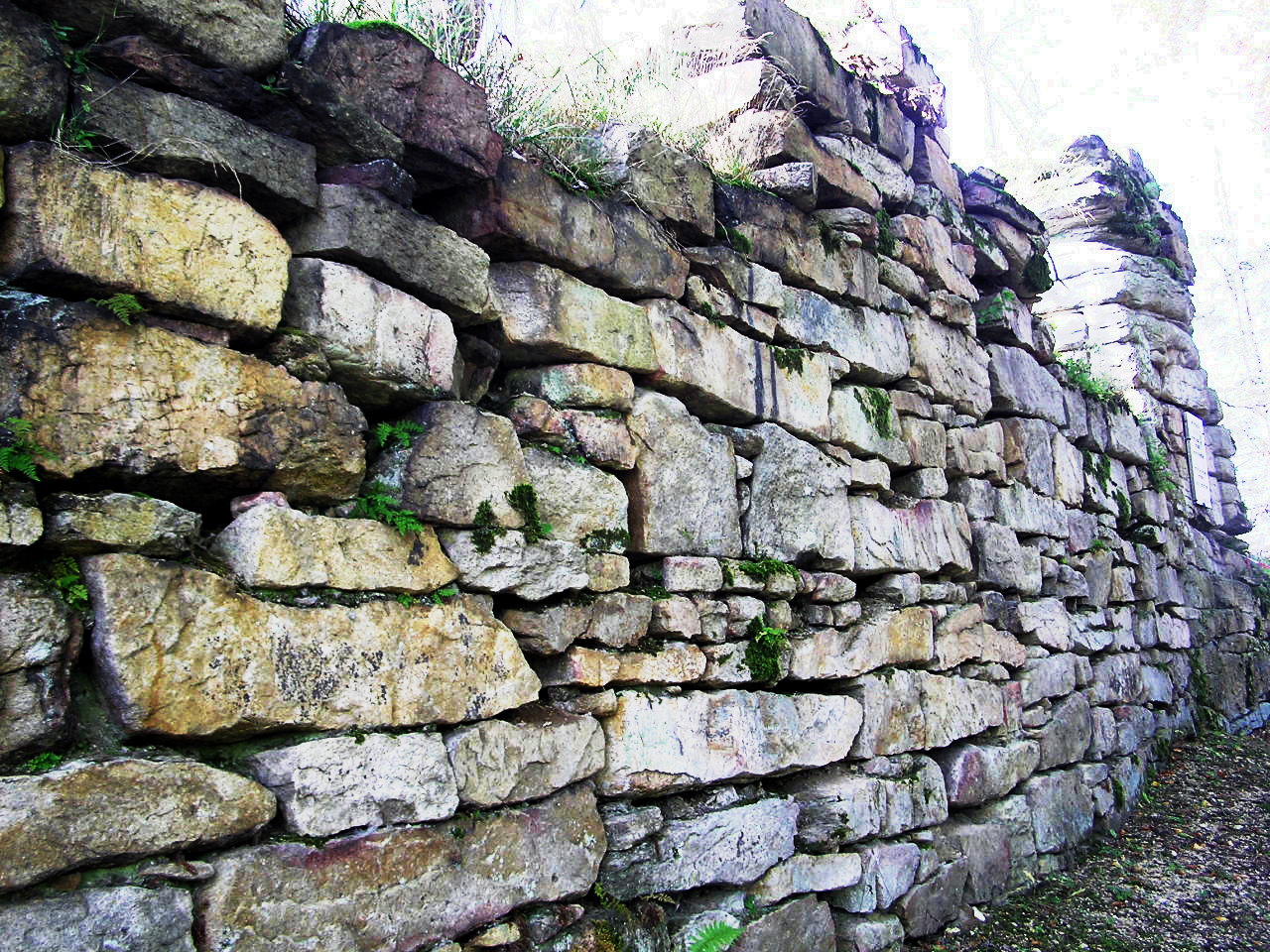
Ruins of Hirschstein

On the northern path between the station of Kirchenlamitz-Ost and the Kornberg summit lies the rock castle (Felsburg) of Hirschstein (744 m above NN). It is the site of a former castle of which only a few remains are still visible.

The castle is one of the oldest in the Fichtelgebirge, is believed to have belonged in 1206 to Rüdiger and Utzo von Hirzberg zen Herschenstein (of the family of Hirschberg). However it does not appear in the records until 1317. At that time Count Berthold of Henneberg enfeoffed the hus on the Kurnberg to the five brothers, the Hirzbergers, Herr Heinrich, Fridrich, Arnolt, Eberhart and Heymann and others. Around the middle of the 14th century the castle was destroyed, because in 1361 Burgrave Frederick of Nuremberg allowed the Hirschbergs to rebuild the castle. However, it was never rebuilt. During the Thirty Years' War the ruins and vaults of the old castle were used by the local countryfolk as a refuge. By margravial order the vaults were filled with rubble in the 18th century because gypsies and other shady characters had squatted there.

== Gypsy Rocks ==
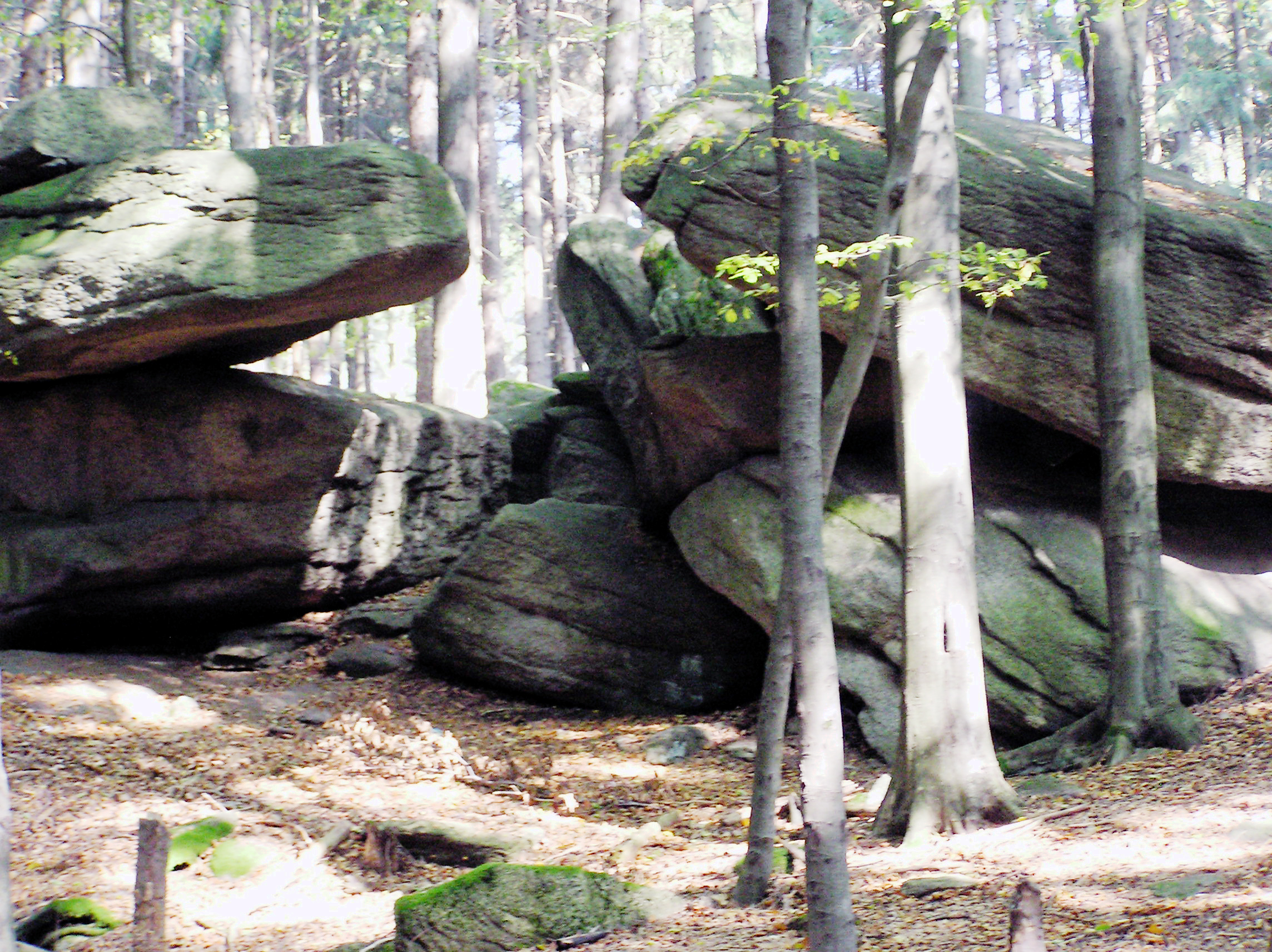
Gypsy Rocks

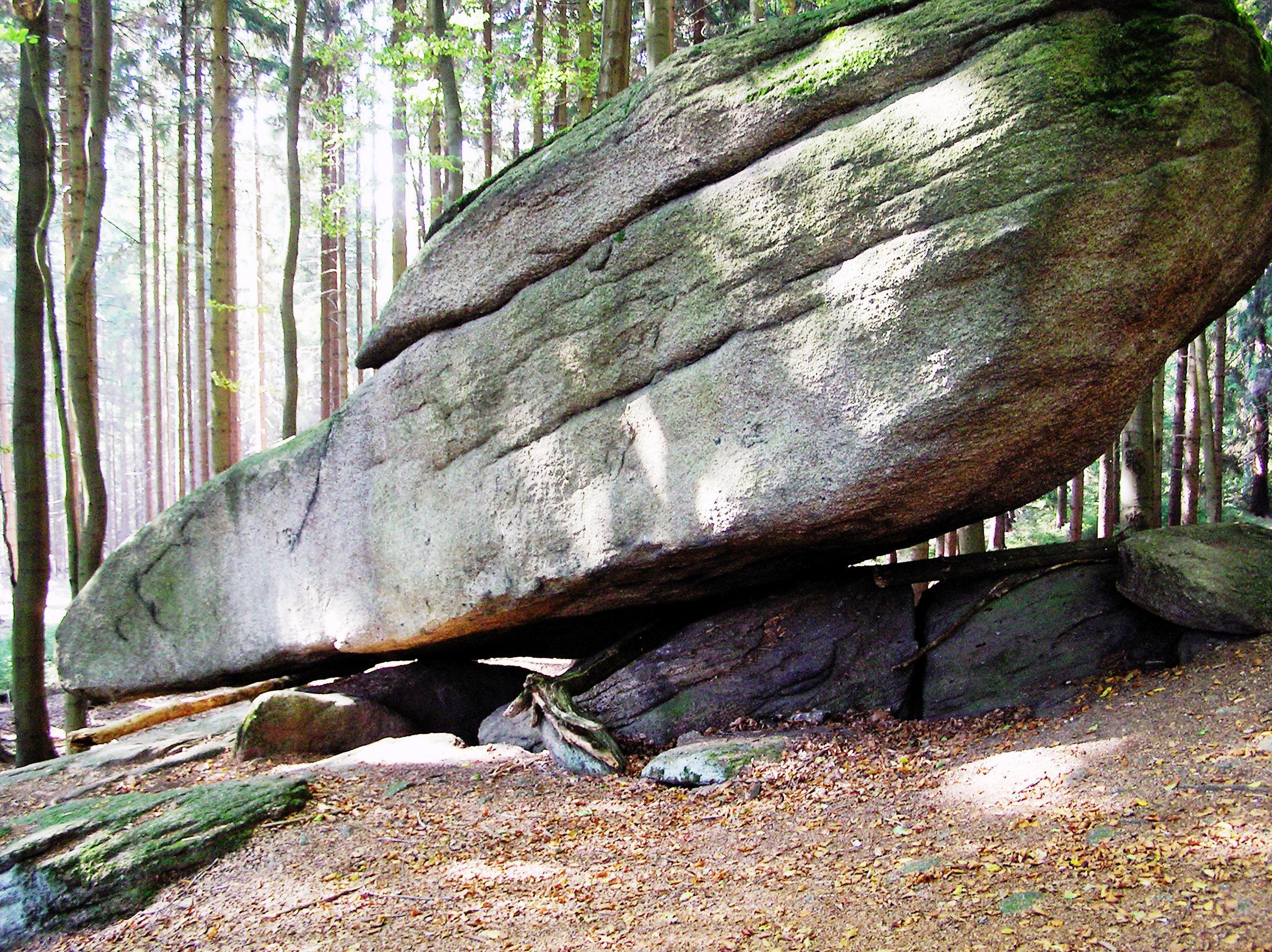
The Wackelstein or rocking stone

The granite rock outcrop known as Gypsy Rocks (Zigeunerfelsen), a fine example of spheroidal weathering, lies on the western slopes of the Kornberg, on the northern path (Nordweg) from Kirchenlamitz-Ost station to the summit. The largest block is about nine metres long, four to seven metres wide and two metres high; it weighs about 250 tonnes. A rock with the name Wackelstein is a rocking stone and can be made to rock with a wooden beam. The area is believed to have offered hordes of gypsies a refuge in times gone by. During the Thirty Years' War the inhabitants of the area took shelter here.

== Former Bundeswehr surveillance tower ==
The Kornberg summit is dominated by the military surveillance tower built in 1973 for the Bundeswehr and taken into service in 1976. During the Cold War it acted as a listening post, picking up military radio traffic by the land forces of the Warsaw Pact. The tower was run by the 946th Signals Company (Fernmeldekompanie 946), which was stationed in Hof/Saale. After the withdrawal of Soviet troops from the former East Germany in 1994 the tower was taken out of service and has since been used by the Fraunhofer-Institut für Integrierte Schaltungen from Erlangen.

Two identical Bundeswehr listening posts stood on elevations along the old eastern border of NATO. These were installations close to the GDR on the Hoher Meißner near Kassel (blown up in 2002) and in the North German Plain on a height of 120 m in Barwedel in Lower Saxony.

== Sources ==
- Rainer H. Schmeissner: Der Kornberg. Heft 4/1982 der Schriftenreihe Beiträge zur Geschichts- und Landeskunde des Fichtelgebirges. Buchhandlung Kohler. Wunsiedel.
- Klaus Müller: Der Große Kornberg - eine Hohe Bastey. Verlag Gisela Arzberger. Selb-Oberweißenbach.
