= Lánov =

- Municipality
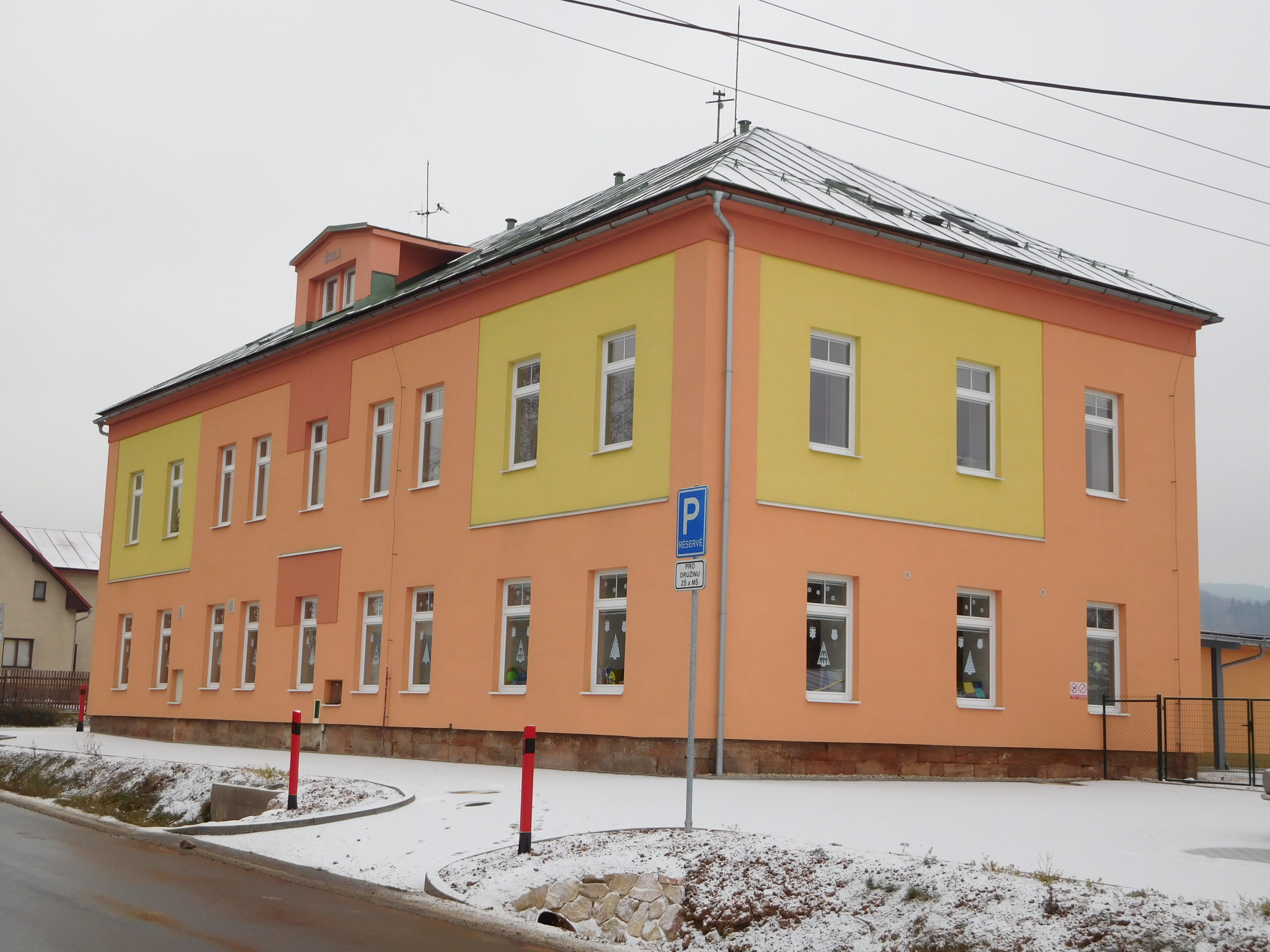
- School in Lánov

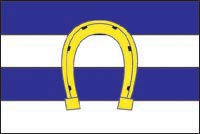
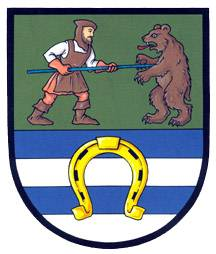
- Flag Coat of arms

- Location in the Czech Republic
- Coordinates: 50°38′6″N 15°39′32″E
- Country: Czech Republic
- Region: Hradec Králové
- District: Trutnov
- First mentioned: 1654

Area
  - Total: 16.95 km^{2} (6.54 sq mi)
- Elevation: 462 m (1,516 ft)

Population (2026-01-01)
  - Total: 1,771
  - Density: 104.5/km^{2} (270.6/sq mi)
- Time zone: UTC+1 (CET)
  - Summer (DST): UTC+2 (CEST)
- Postal code: 543 41
- Website: www.lanov.cz

Lánov (German: Langenau) is a municipality and village in Trutnov District in the Hradec Králové Region of the Czech Republic. It has about 1,800 inhabitants.

== Administrative division ==
Lánov consists of two municipal parts (in brackets population according to the 2021 census):

- Horní Lánov (451)
- Prostřední Lánov (1,290)

== Demographics ==
Historical population
Year	Pop.	±%
1869	2,105	—
1880	2,179	+3.5%
1890	2,109	−3.2%
1900	2,287	+8.4%
1910	2,404	+5.1%
1921	2,156	−10.3%
1930	2,242	+4.0%
1950	1,293	−42.3%
1961	1,483	+14.7%
1970	1,373	−7.4%
1980	1,430	+4.2%
1991	1,445	+1.0%
2001	1,498	+3.7%
2011	1,759	+17.4%
2021	1,741	−1.0%
Source: Censuses
