= Selb =

- Town
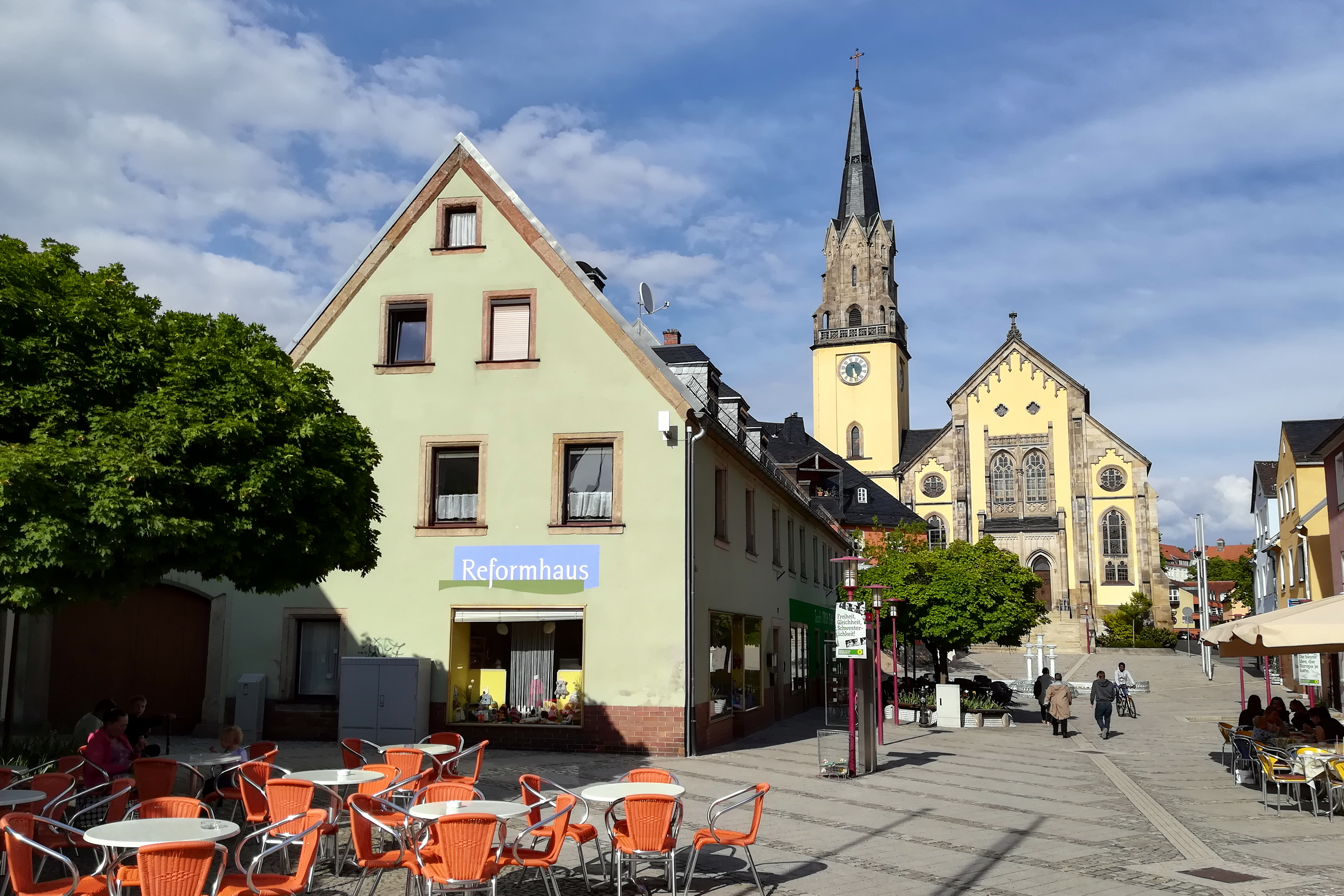
- Martin Luther Square with the Church of Saint Andrew

- Coat of arms

- Location of Selb within Wunsiedel im Fichtelgebirge district
- Interactive map of Selb
- Location within Germany Location within Bavaria
- Coordinates: 50°10′N 12°8′E
- Country: Germany
- State: Bavaria
- Admin. region: Oberfranken
- District: Wunsiedel im Fichtelgebirge

Government
  - Mayor (2020–26): Ulrich Pötzsch

Area
  - Total: 86.07 km^{2} (33.23 sq mi)
- Elevation: 562 m (1,844 ft)

Population (2025-12-31)
  - Total: 14,536
  - Density: 168.9/km^{2} (437.4/sq mi)
- Time zone: UTC+01:00 (CET)
  - Summer (DST): UTC+02:00 (CEST)
- Postal codes: 95100
- Dialling codes: 09287
- Vehicle registration: WUN, MAK, REH, SEL
- Website: www.selb.de

Selb (German pronunciation: [zɛlp]) is a town in the district of Wunsiedel in the region of Upper Franconia in the state of Bavaria in Germany. It is situated in the Fichtel Mountains, on the border with the Czech Republic, 20 kilometres (12 mi) northwest of Cheb and 23 kilometres (14 mi) southeast of Hof.

Rosenthal company logo

Selb is well known for its porcelain manufacture, and is the home of the Rosenthal factory, founded in 1879 by Philipp Rosenthal as a family business. In the 1960s the town was the location for an unrealized town development plan prepared by Walter Gropius shortly before his death.

The "Selber Wiesenfest", a traditional fair with thousands of visitors per day, always takes place on the "Goldberg" on the second weekend of July.

== Villages ==
- Dürrewiesen
- Spielberg

== Demographics ==
Historical population
Year	Pop.	±% p.a.
1840	6,141	—
1871	7,405	+0.61%
1900	10,766	+1.30%
1925	17,554	+1.97%
1939	17,637	+0.03%
1950	24,336	+2.97%
1961	24,532	+0.07%
1970	24,039	−0.23%
1987	19,615	−1.19%
2011	15,425	−1.00%
2022	14,846	−0.35%
Source: Bayerisches Landesamt für Statistik, Federal Statistical Office of Germany

== Notable people ==
- Manfred Ahne (born 1961), German ice hockey player
- Sebastian Bösel (born 1994), German football player
- Siegfried Hausner (1952–1975), a member of the Red Army Faction, was born and raised in Selb
- Florian Ondruschka (born 1987), German ice hockey player
- Richard Rogler (1949–2024), German satirist, Kabarett artist and professor of Kabarett at the University of the Arts in Berlin
- Philipp Rosenthal (1855–1937), founder of Rosenthal enterprise
- Philip Rosenthal (industrialist) (1916–2001), son of above, reclaimed factory from Nazis, became leading SPD politician
- Peter Schiller (1957–2020), German ice hockey player
- The ski mountaineer and mountain biker Andreas Strobel was born 1972 in Selb

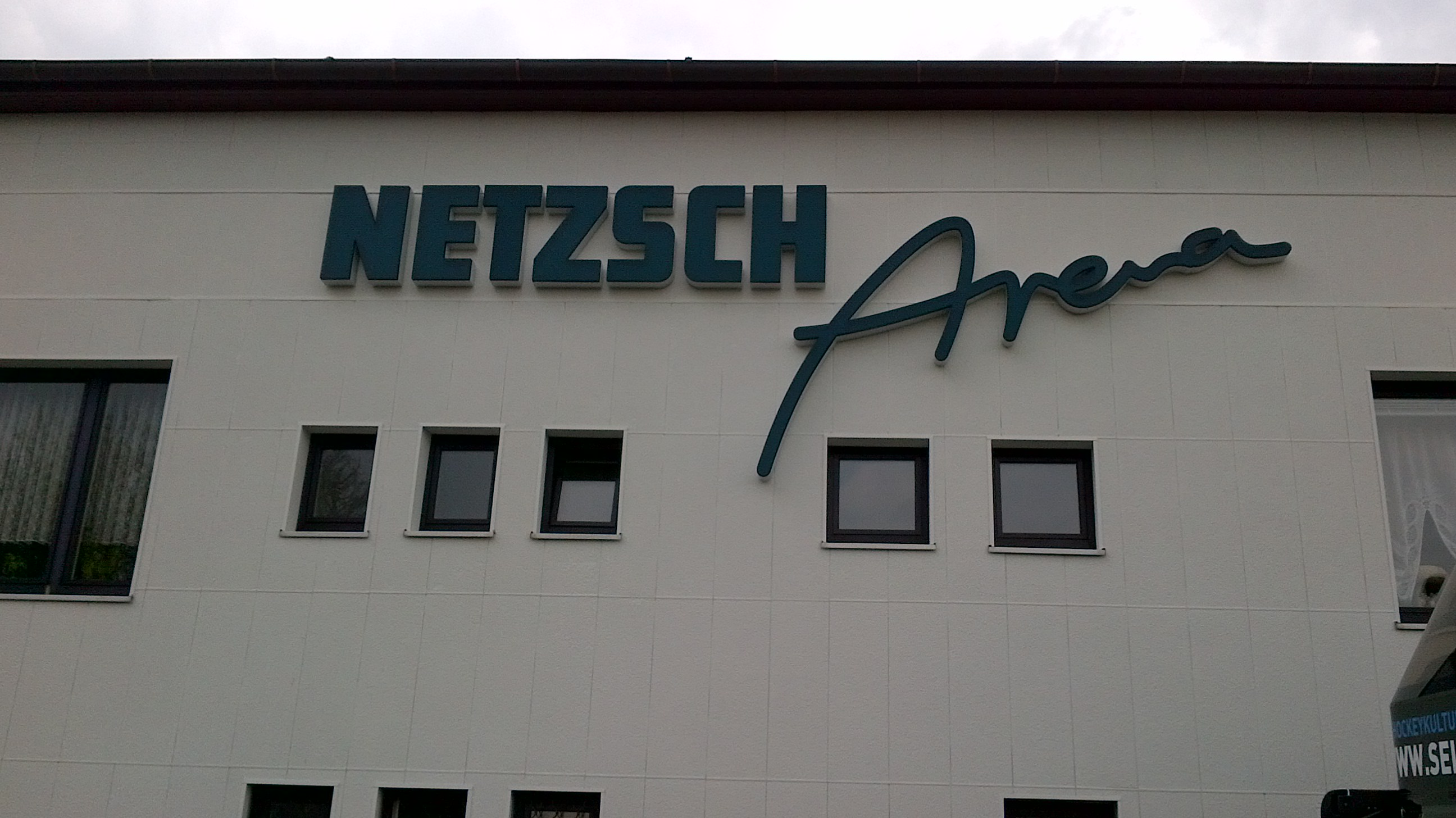
Main sports venue in Selb. Home of the Selber Woelfe Oberliga Eishockey team.
