= Schwarzenbach an der Saale =

Schwarzenbach a.d.Saale
- Town
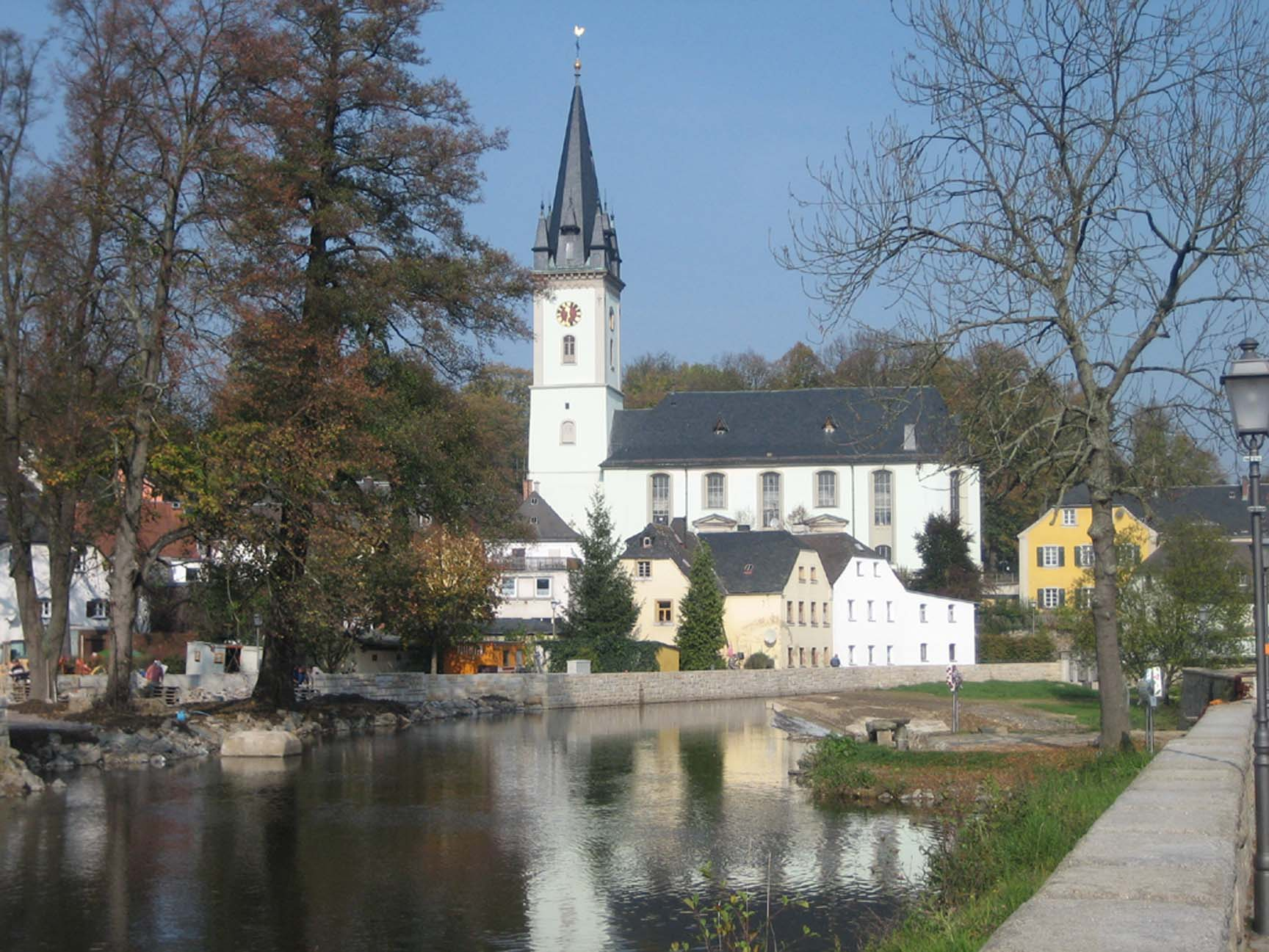
- Church of Saint Gumbertus

- Coat of arms

- Location of Schwarzenbach a.d.Saale within Hof district
- Interactive map of Schwarzenbach a.d.Saale
- Location within Germany Location within Bavaria
- Coordinates: 50°13′15″N 11°56′0″E
- Country: Germany
- State: Bavaria
- Admin. region: Oberfranken
- District: Hof

Government
  - Mayor (2020–26): Hans-Peter Baumann (CSU)

Area
  - Total: 59.18 km^{2} (22.85 sq mi)
- Elevation: 500 m (1,600 ft)

Population (2025-12-31)
  - Total: 6,505
  - Density: 109.9/km^{2} (284.7/sq mi)
- Time zone: UTC+01:00 (CET)
  - Summer (DST): UTC+02:00 (CEST)
- Postal codes: 95126
- Dialling codes: 09284
- Vehicle registration: HO
- Website: www.schwarzenbach-saale.de

Schwarzenbach an der Saale (German pronunciation: [ˈʃvaʁtsn̩bax ʔan deːɐ̯ ˈzaːlə], lit. 'Schwarzenbach on the Saale') is a small industrial town in the district of Hof, in Bavaria, Germany. It is situated on the river Saale, 11 km south of Hof.

Within the town is the Gedenkstätte Langer Gang, a memorial to the Nazi victims of the Helmbrechts concentration camp, which was near Schwarzenbach an der Saale, and particularly of the victims of the death march from Helmbrechts concentration camp to Volary.

After the war, Erika Fuchs, German translator of Carl Barks's comics, lived and worked in Schwarzenbach for fifty years. A museum in memory of her and her work was opened in the town in 2015, known as Erika-Fuchs-Haus.

German Romantic writer Jean Paul also lived in the town, from 1790 to 1794. Schwarzenbach is mentioned in his works.

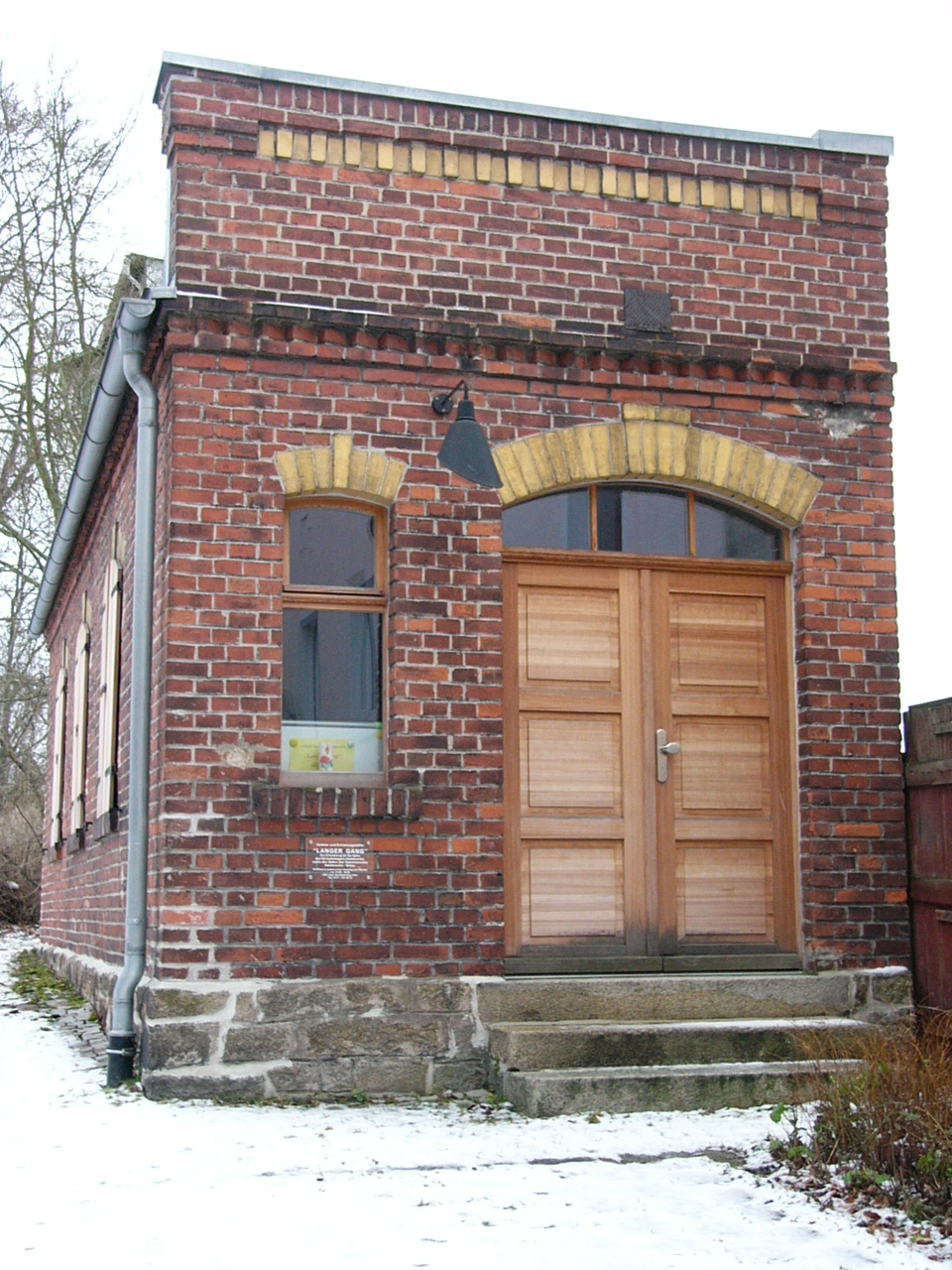
Memorial to Nazi victims of the Helmbrechts concentration camp
