= Kirchenlamitz =

- Town
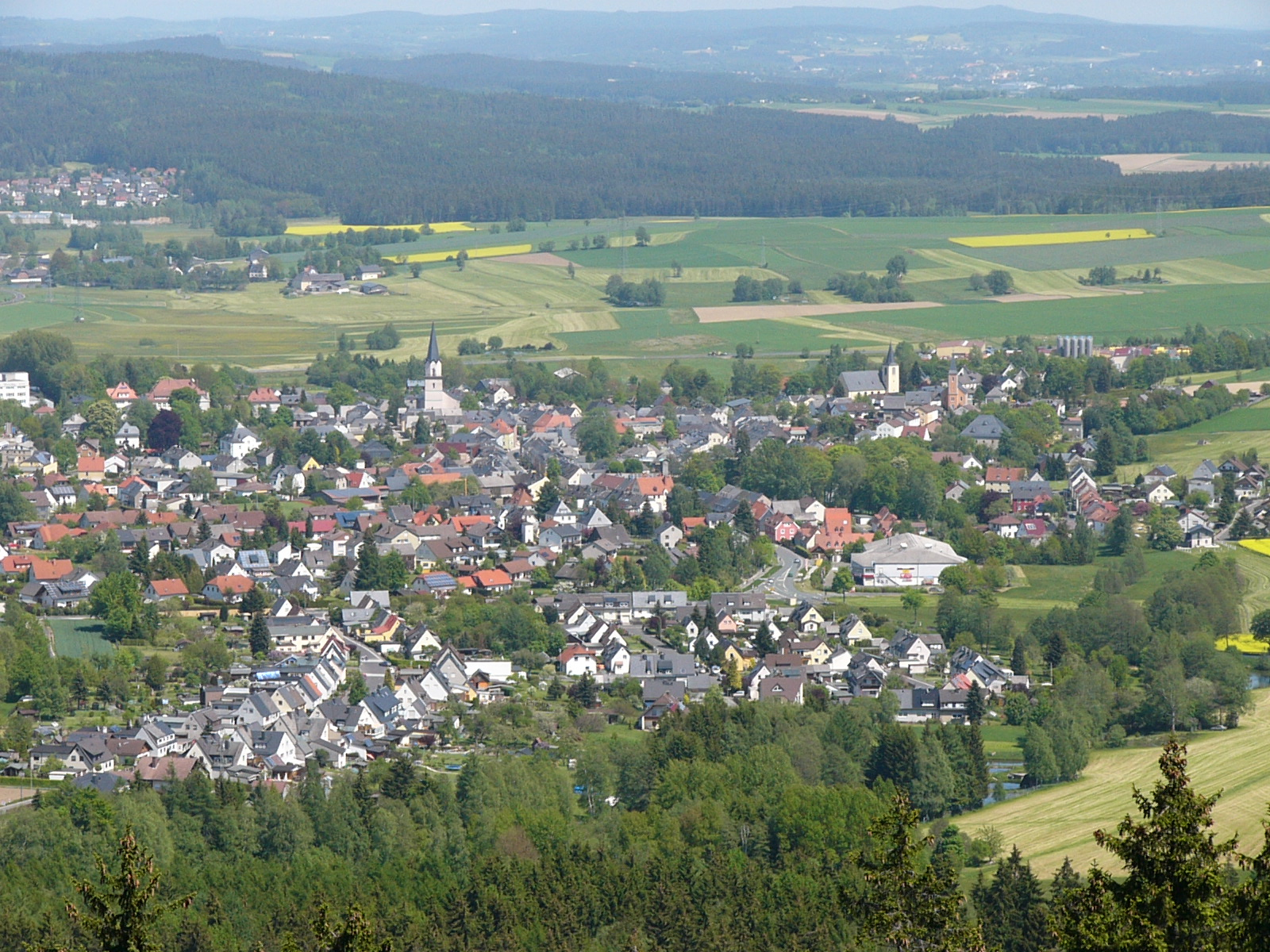
- Kirchenlamitz

- Coat of arms

- Location of Kirchenlamitz within Wunsiedel im Fichtelgebirge district
- Interactive map of Kirchenlamitz
- Location within Germany Location within Bavaria
- Coordinates: 50°09′N 11°57′E
- Country: Germany
- State: Bavaria
- Admin. region: Oberfranken
- District: Wunsiedel im Fichtelgebirge
- Subdivisions: 13 Ortsteile

Government
  - Mayor (2022–28): Jens Büttner (CSU)

Area
  - Total: 48.48 km^{2} (18.72 sq mi)
- Elevation: 599–799 m (1,965–2,621 ft)

Population (2025-12-31)
  - Total: 3,059
  - Density: 63.10/km^{2} (163.4/sq mi)
- Time zone: UTC+01:00 (CET)
  - Summer (DST): UTC+02:00 (CEST)
- Postal codes: 95158
- Dialling codes: 09285
- Vehicle registration: WUN
- Website: www.kirchenlamitz.de

Kirchenlamitz (German pronunciation: [kɪʁçn̩ˈlaːmɪts]) is a town in the district of Wunsiedel, in Bavaria, Germany. It is situated in the Fichtel Mountains, 13 km northwest of Wunsiedel and 19 km south of Hof.
