= High Fichtel Mountains =

Mountain range in Germany

High Fichtel (Hohes Fichtelgebirge)
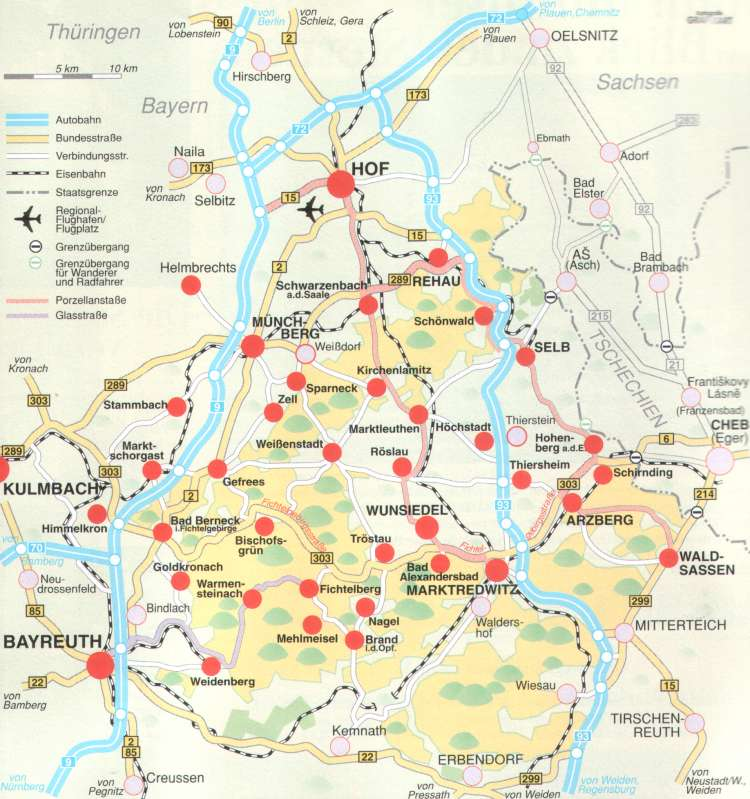
- Location of the High Fichtel

Highest point
- Peak: Schneeberg
- Elevation: 1,051 m above NN

Geography
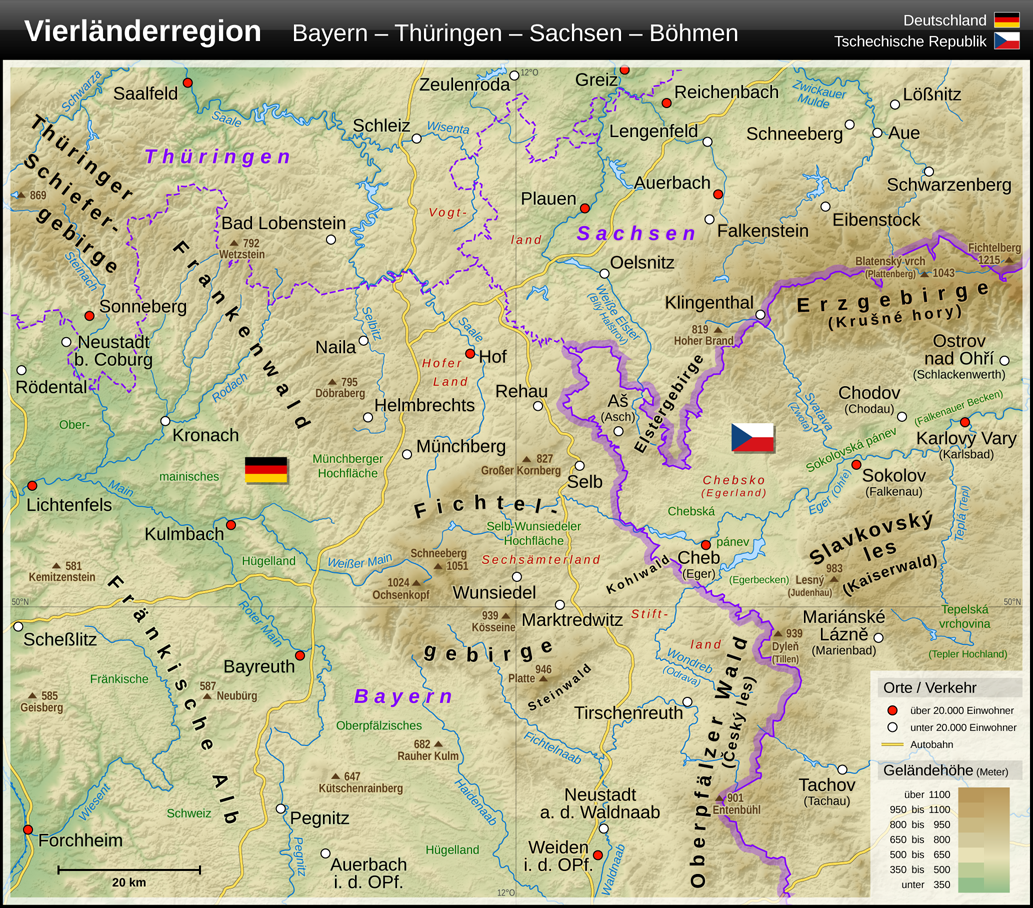
- The High Fichtel within northeastern Bavaria
- State(s): Bavaria, extreme west of the Czech Republic
- Range coordinates: 50°03′00″N 11°51′00″E
- Parent range: Thuringian-Franconian Highlands

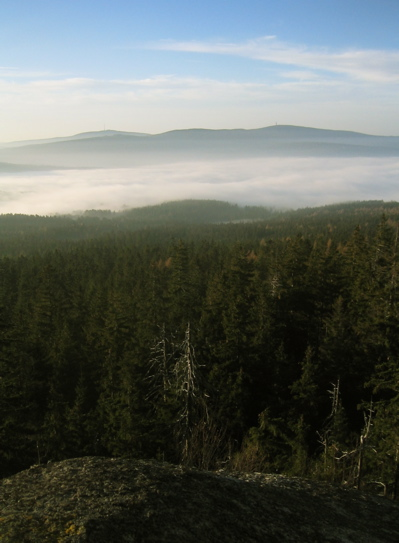
View of the High Fichtel Mountains

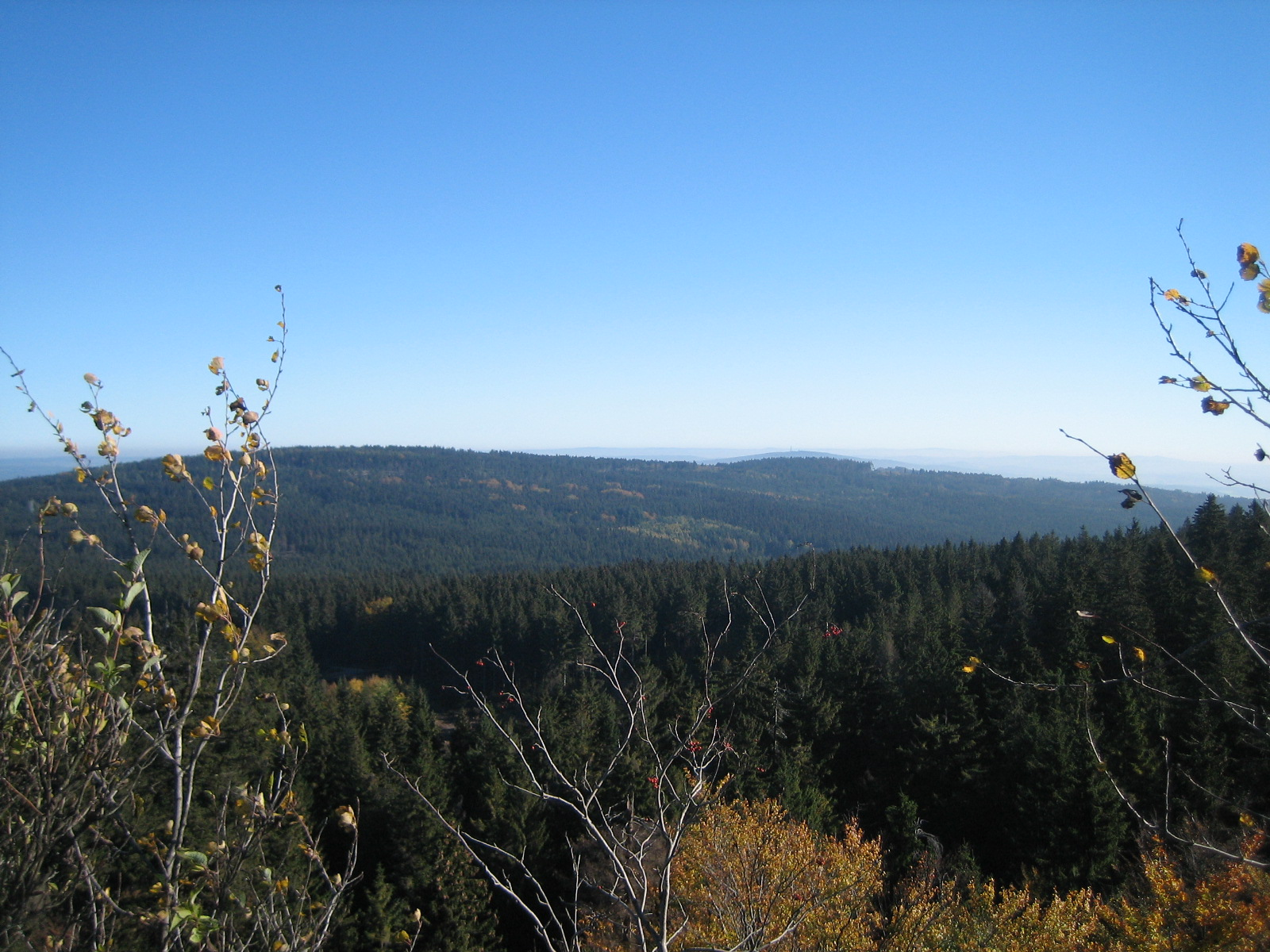
The High Fichtel seen from the Waldstein

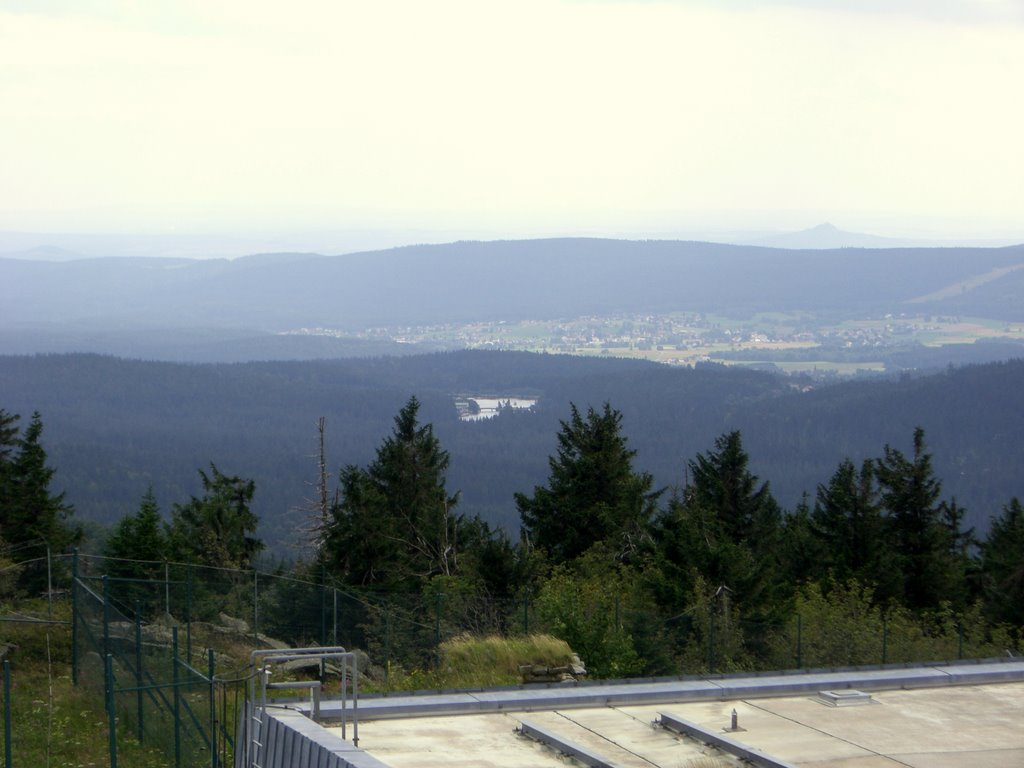
Vies of the Fichtelsee and Mehlmeisel from the Schneeberg

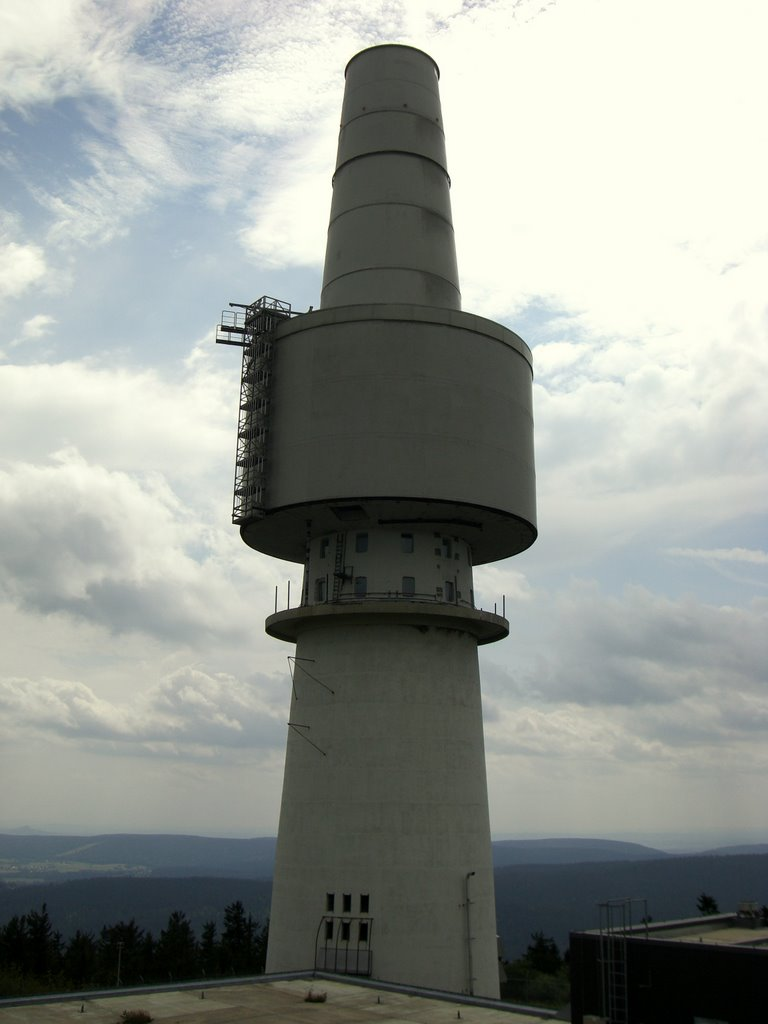
The transmission tower on the Schneeberg in Aug 2007

The High Fichtel Mountains (German: Hohes Fichtelgebirge), or High Fichtel, form a mountainous and heavily forested range consisting of several mountain chains in the shape of a horseshoe, the Fichtel Mountain Horseshoe (Fichtelgebirgs-Hufeisen), that rings the Selb-Wunsiedel Plateau.

As a natural region the High Fichtel Mountains are major unit 394 within the major unit group of the Thuringian-Franconian Highlands (39), that run from the Thuringian Forest to the Fichtel Mountains. Since September 2010 there is a new system for classifying the natural regions of northeast Bavaria, whereby the natural region of the High Fichtel only covers the central mountain region of the Scheeberg, Ochsenkopf and Kösseine, whilst the Waldstein ridge, the Steinwald and lower parts of the horseshoe represent special subordinate natural regions of the Fichtel Mountains.

== Geography ==
The High Fichtel Mountains begin in the northeast at the Kornberg, continue via the Waldstein, Schneeberg, Ochsenkopf and Königsheide in the southwest to the Kösseine, then over the Steinwald and Reichsforst to the Kohlwald in the southeast.

In the geomorphological division of the neighbouring Czech Republic, the Aš Hills (German: Ascher Hügelland; Czech: Ašská vrchovina), the Hazlov Hills (Haslauer Hügelland or Hazlovská pahorkatina) and the Cheb Hills (Egerer Hügelland or Chebská pahorkatina) are counted as part of the (High) Fichtel range.

== Geology ==
Geologically the mountain range consists mainly of granite. The history of its orogeny begins in the Pre-Cambrian about 750–800 million years ago – covering almost 20% of the earth's history, something which only applies to a few of the surviving ranges of the truncated Central Uplands of Germany today.

== Mountains ==
The mountains of the High Fichtel include the following, sorted by their elevation in metres (m) above sea level (NN):

Mountain	Height (m)	Remarks
Schneeberg	1,051	Highest mountain in the Fichtel range, Haberstein (923 m) on its southwestern slopes
Ochsenkopf	1,024	Winter sport, chair and drag lifts, Weißmainfelsen (906 m) on the eastern slopes
Nußhardt	972	
Seehügel	953	Ahornfels (910 m) on southwestern slope
Platte (Steinwald)	946	
Kösseine	939	Subpeak of Kleine Kösseine (922 m)
Platte (Schneeberg)	885	
Burgstein (Kösseine)	879	Burgsteinfelsen at 869.2 m, Luisenburg Kreuzfelsen (785 m) at northern foot
Großer Waldstein	877	Winter sport, cross-country skiing trails
Rudolfstein (Schneeberg)	866	Rock formation at the summit and Drei Brüder formation (850 m) 500 m to the southwest
Hohberg (Königsheide)	863	Winter sport, drag lifts
Weißenstein (Steinwald)	863	
Bergkopf (Waldstein)	857	25 m high (817 m above NHN) graniterock formation of Hoher Stein at northeastern foot
Haberstein (Kösseine)	848	
Großer Kornberg	827	Winter sport, drag lift and cross-country skiing trails
Hohe Matze	813	Prinzenfelsen (751 m) rock formation
Epprechtstein (Waldstein)	798	Winter sport, cross-country skiing trails
Lehstenberg	768	
Schauerberg (Kösseine)	767	
Schauerberg (Schneeberg)	732	
Armesberg	731	
Rabenberg (Schönwald)	713	
Pfaffenberg (Schönwald)	710	
Steinberg (Reichsforst)	705	
Ruheberg (Reichsforst)	692	Summit region is a nature reserve
Wenderner Stein	686	
Teichelberg	685	
Fürstenstein (Fichtel)	675	
Výhledy (German: Oberkunreuthberg)	656	Brunnenhaus
Sieben-Linden-Berg	643	Winter sport, drag lift
Zelená hora (German: Grünberg)	637	transmission tower, viewing tower
Kohlberg (Kohlwald)	632	observation tower
Glasberg	628	Dreifaltigkeitskirche Kappl
Dietzenberg	626	
Lehenbühl	620	near Konnersreuth
Elmberg (Reichsforst)	618	
Gossenbühl	616	
Konnsbühl	613	near Konnersreuth

== Settlements ==
- Bischofsgrün
- Brand (Oberpfalz)
- Erbendorf
- Ebnath
- Fichtelberg
- Goldkronach
- Konnersreuth
- Mehlmeisel
- Nagel
- Neusorg
- Schönbrunn
- Sparneck
- Tröstau
- Warmensteinach
- Weißdorf
- Zell im Fichtelgebirge

== Transport ==
- Marktredwitz railway hub
- B 303 and B 15 federal highways
- A 93 and A 9 motorways

== Sources ==
- Fritsch Wanderkarte 1:50.000 Fichtelgebirge-Steinwald, ISBN 978-3-86116-052-6
