= Königsheide (Fichtel Mountains) =

Hohberg
- Location within Bavaria

Highest point
- Elevation: 863 m above sea level (NN) (2,831 ft)
- Coordinates: 49°59′28″N 11°44′49″E

Geography
- Location: Bavaria, Germany
- Parent range: Fichtel Mountains

Geology
- Mountain type: gneiss-phyllite

The Königsheide is a high, forested ridge, made of gneiss-phyllite rock in the Fichtel Mountains in Bavaria, Germany. It is located to the southwest of the Ochsenkopf mountain. It is bordered to the east and south by the river of the Warme Steinach, and to the west by the Franconian Line. The villages of Warmensteinach and Weidenberg and the town of Goldkronach lie on the Königsheide.

In a narrower sense the Königsheide refers to the partly boggy high plateau around its highest peak, the Hohberg (863 m above sea level (NN)). The origin of the name of this forested ridge has not been fully established. In 1317 the region was called Wulwingesheide and then, in 1542, the Königsheide ("King's Heath").

== Access ==
The wooded area is a state forest; there are no public roads, only forestry tracks. Local history researchers have determined that an important historic road (Altstraße) ran from Nemmersdorf (part of Goldkronach) over the ridge to Warmensteinach. It came from the Franconian Jura and went to Eger, which is why it is referred in the literature as Egerer Straße ("The Eger Road").

Numerous marked hiking trails have been laid out through the forest by the Fichtelgebirge Club. An interesting trail approaches from the south, from Markt Weidenberg, and runs over the Hohberg to the places of interest. From the west are the three major trails known as West Way (Westweg), South Way (Südweg) and Middle Way (Mittelweg). A white/blue/white signposted trail links the village of Nemmersdorf with Warmensteinach, running up the Himmelsleiter over the Königsheide.
