= Haberstein =

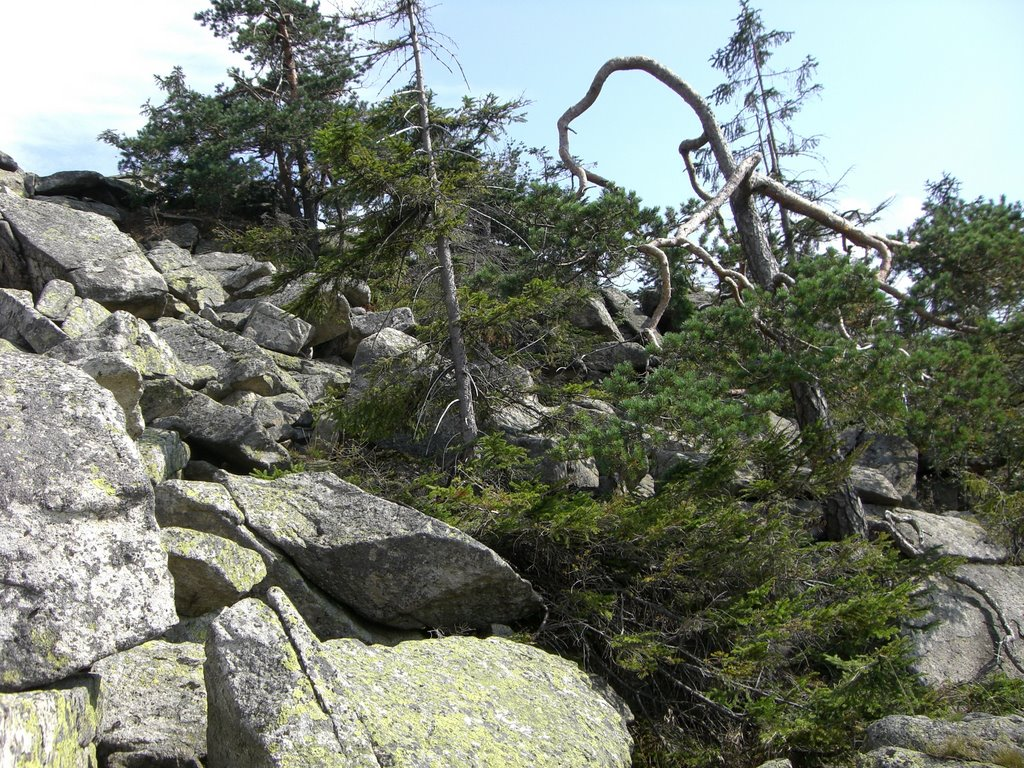
- Rock pile on the Haberstein in August 2007

Highest point
- Elevation: 927 m above sea level (NN) (3,041 ft)
- Coordinates: 50°02′46″N 11°50′39″E

Geography
- Location within Bavaria
- Location: Bavaria, Germany
- Parent range: Fichtel Mountains

Geology
- Mountain type: Subpeak of the Schneeberg

The Haberstein is a blockfield of granite rocks complete with a large rock tower. It is located on the western slopes of the Schneeberg, the highest mountain in the Fichtel Mountains in Germany. From the Haberstein there is a good view of the neighbouring mountain of the Ochsenkopf and its recently built ski jump. The nearby village of Bischofsgrün is also easy to pick out. The Haberstein can be easily reached on foot over a network of walking trails.
