= Nußhardt =

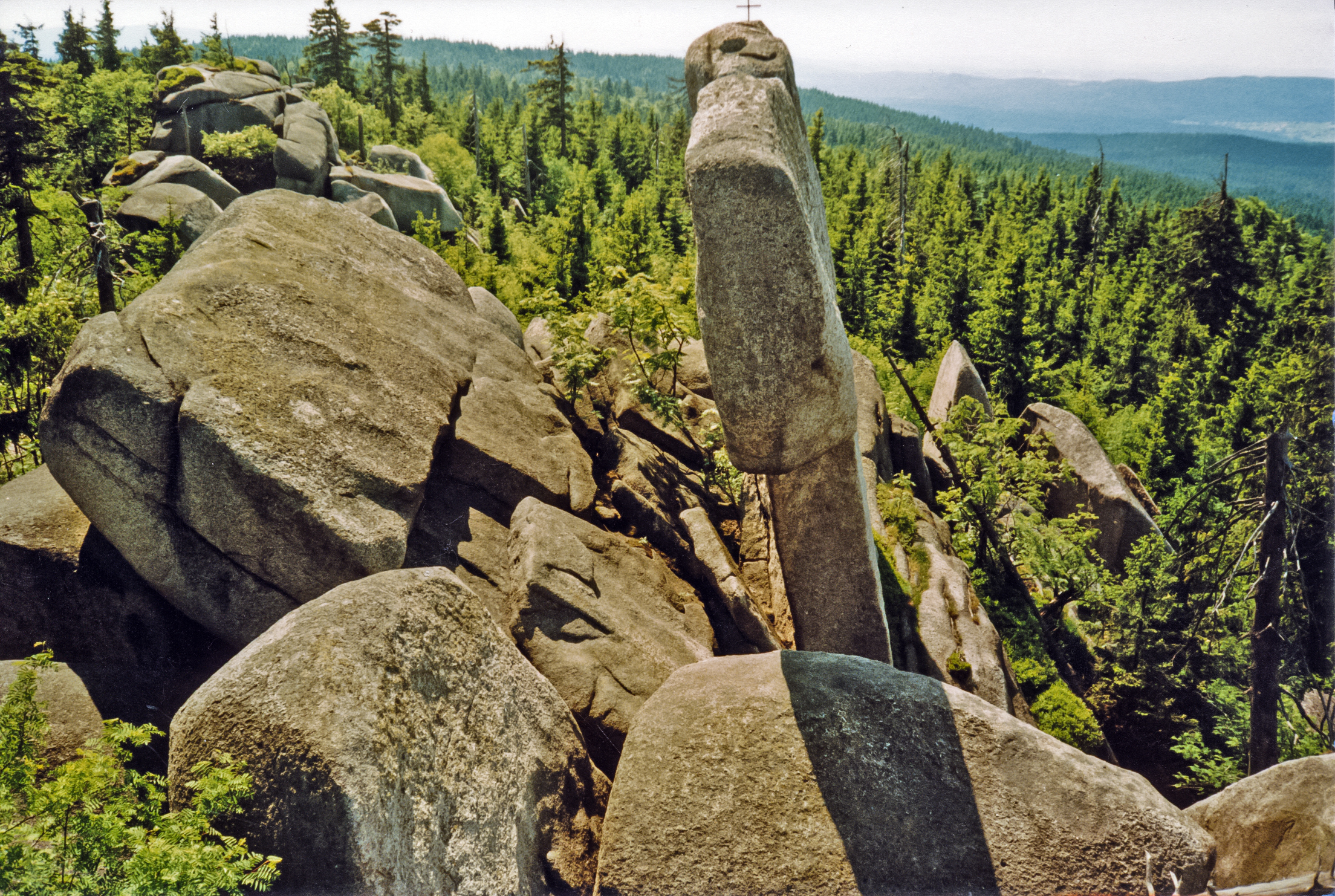
- Rocks on Nußhardt top

Highest point
- Elevation: 972 m above sea level (NN) (3,189 ft)
- Isolation: 0.65 km (0.40 mi) to Schneeberg
- Coordinates: 50°03′33″N 11°53′06″E

Geography
- Location within Bavaria
- Location: Bavaria, Germany
- Parent range: Fichtel Mountains

The Nußhardt is the third highest mountain in the Fichtel Mountains in the south German state of Bavaria at 972 m above sea level (NN). It lies in the far northeast of the state and has a rocky summit characteristic of the Fichtel Mountains (coarse-grained Kern Granite G3 and augen gneiss at the southeast end). The summit area with its felsenmeer and tor is a nature reserve with an area of 5.5 hectares (14 acres). In addition the Nußhardt is incorporated into the geotope register of the Bavarian State Geological Department under No. 472R013.

== Location ==
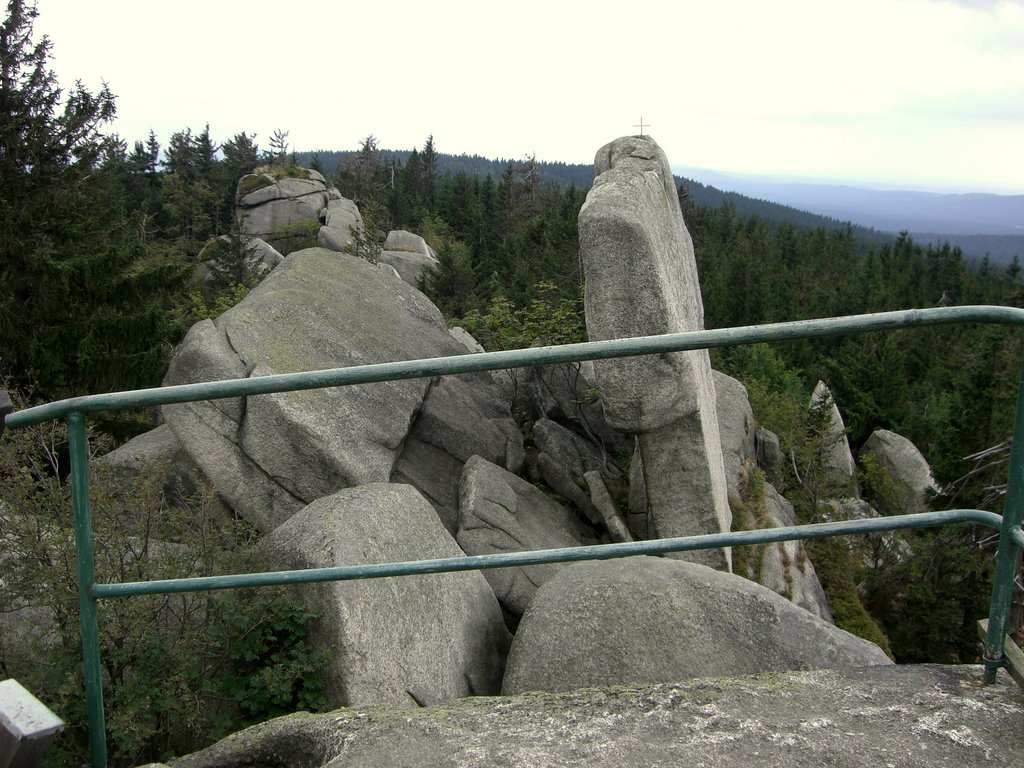
Observation platform on the Nußhardt looking towards Seehaus

The Nußhardt lies on the FGV's main hill trail between the FGV hostel of Seehaus and the Schneeberg, the highest mountain in the range. The climbing area is looked after by the local FGV branch at Vordorf.

== Legends ==
On the rocky viewing point, there are eight small bowl-shaped hollows in the granite, known as druid bowls. In former centuries, these hollows were believed to be sacrificial bowls used in heathen cults. However, it is now understood that they are a unique form of weathering in the granite. Another notable feature is the Nußhardtstube, also referred to as the 'Nußhardt parlour'. This covered chamber stretches approximately 50 m in length and has a low entrance located on the southern side of the rocks.

== Name ==
In the records of the Berneck office in 1536 the Nußhardt appears as Nusser, and again in a margraviate forest inspection report of 1536. Its spelling in the records and literature varies: Nusser, Nosser, Nußhardt – there has been no lack of interpretations for these names, but none has been really convincing.

== Climbing area ==
As early as 1880 the first steps to the highest point of the Nußhardt tor were erected by the Fichtel Mountains branch of the German-Austrian Alpine Club to give "better views" of the Schneeberg, Ochsenkopf, the Fichtelsee, the Franconian Jura and the Kemnather Land.

== Sources ==
- Herrmann, Detmar : Lexikon Fichtelgebirge, Ackermann Verlag Hof/Saale
- Der Siebenstern, Vereinszeitschrift des Fichtelgebirgsvereins e. V., Theresienstraße 2, 95632 Wunsiedel

Maps:

- Fritsch Wanderkarte 1:50.000
