= Bayreuth–Warmensteinach railway =

Railway line in Germany

Bayreuth–Warmensteinach

Overview
- Line number: 5000

Service
- Route number: 862 (Bayreuth–Weidenberg); 863 (Weidenberg–Warmensteinach)

Technical
- Line length: 22.9 km (14.2 mi)
- Track gauge: 1,435 mm (4 ft 8 1/2 in)

The Bayreuth–Warmensteinach railway is a branch line in the Bavarian province of Upper Franconia in southern Germany. It is the last still partially intact of the seven branch lines, that formerly served the Fichtel Mountains.

== History ==
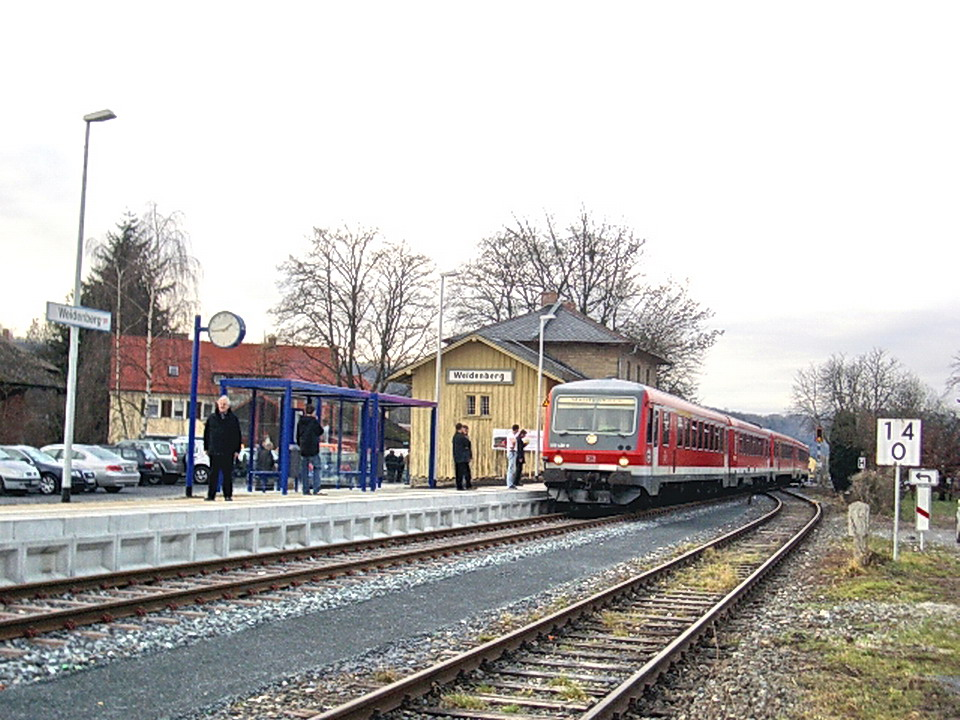
The re-opened Bayreuth–Weidenberg railway, January 2007

On 1 January 1993, the line from Weidenberg to Warmensteinach was closed; the official reason being bridge damage. On 10 June 2001 services on the remaining section were withdrawn. It had already been decided to dismantle the line, but this was prevented by its sale to the Deutsche Regionaleisenbahn (DRE). Operations restarted on 5 May 2002; but ceased again on 1 June 2004.

Because the former Bavarian Minister for Transport, Otto Wiesheu, refused to finance this non-federal line with public money, responsibility for the section of the line from Bayreuth to Weidenberg was transferred to the local authorities (Bayreuth district and Markt Weidenberg) under a construction rental agreement on 1 August 2005. By this means financial support could be provided under the community transport finance law. The new leaseholders transferred the operating powers on this section of line to the DRE.

The Bayreuth–Weidenberg section was thoroughly renovated in 2006 and opened to traffic from 10 January 2007 again. Currently, seven pairs of trains run daily from Monday to Friday and, from 2011, weekend services will also be introduced.

== Future ==
=== Reactivated section to Warmensteinach ===
The extension of railway traffic from Weidenberg to Warmensteinach has currently foundered following a decision by the district of Bayreuth to restrict train services to the Bayreuth–Weidenberg section. As a result, the Free State of Bavaria is not prepared to finance the upgrade of the adjoining section of line to Warmensteinach. Nevertheless, there are attempts to reverse this district council decision as quickly as possible in order to satisfy the requirements for the renovation of the remaining section.

After initial objections the village of Warmensteinach proposed the reactivation of the remaining stretch of line. The market town of Weidenberg also supported a short-term reactivation of the line as far as the village of Mengersreuth (to date the line is still workable) or Sophienthal. In autumn 2007 the section was freed up and, in 2008, a refurbishment plan was to be produced. The bridge at Mengersreuth (closed in 1993) was supposed to be opened again as part of the renovation work.

The reactivation of the line to Warmensteinach is being demanded by individual political parties in order to support the economy and tourism and to improve transport safety. In spring 2009 the Bavarian state parliament (the Landtag) should decide on a proposal for a resolution by the Fraktion Freie Wähler (Free Voters party).

On 16 August 2010, the Bayreuth district chief executive, Hübner, announced the final closure of the Weidenberg–Warmensteinach section. Due to the high investment costs, which would not be supported by the Free State of Bavaria, and the low numbers of passengers anticipated, renovating the line would not be worthwhile. Instead the bus services in the High Fichtel Mountains would be expanded.

=== Upper Franconia Diesel Network ===
The line is part of the Upper Franconia Diesel Network (Dieselnetz Oberfranken) tendered by the Bayerische Eisenbahngesellschaft on 8 February 2008. This should see the introduction of new vehicles and improved services from 12 June 2011.
