= Seehügel =

Mountain in Germany

Coordinates: 50°01′52″N 11°52′36″E

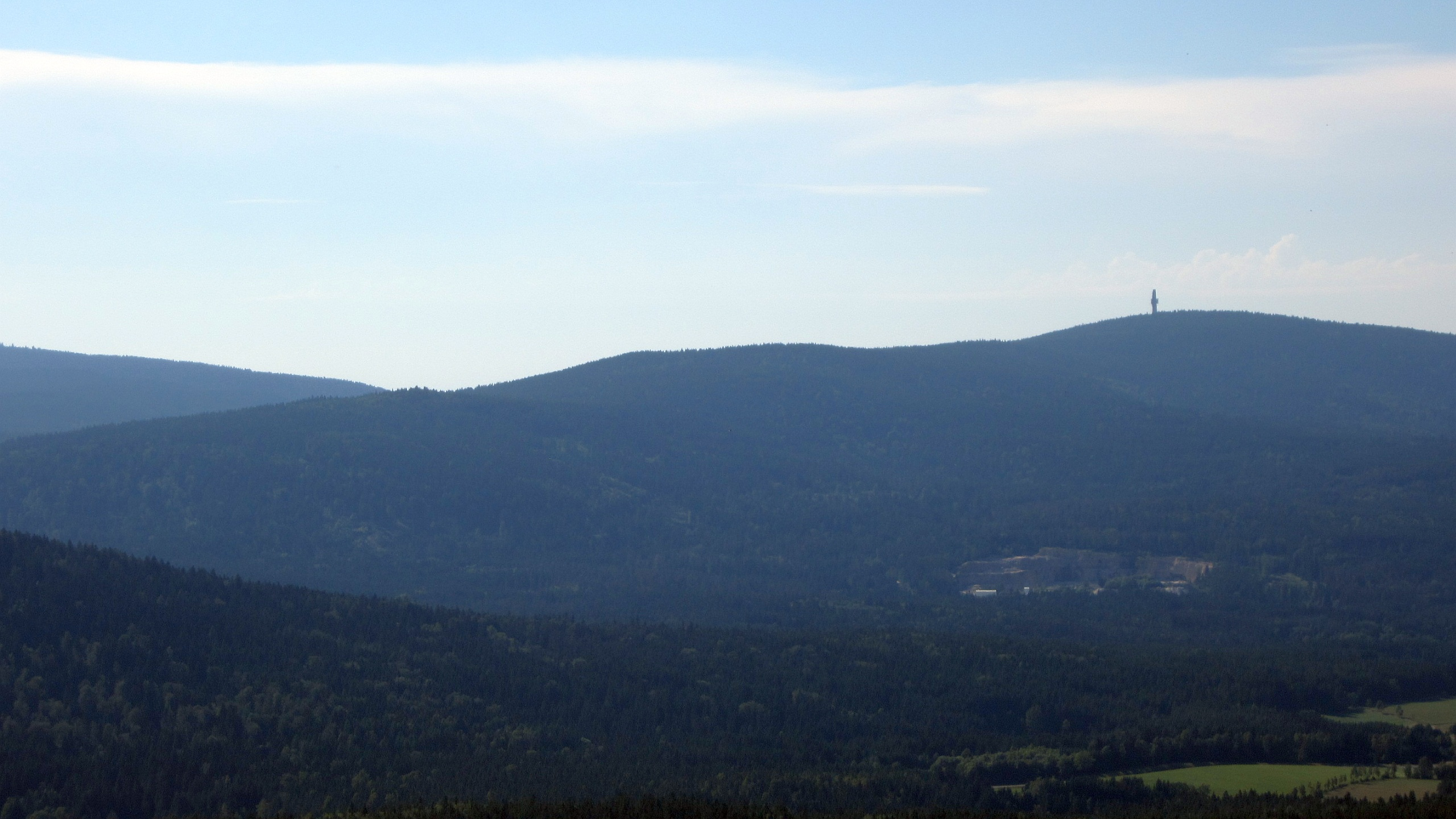
- Seehügel (middle) seen from the Kosseine.

Highest point
- Elevation: 953 m (3,127 ft)
- Isolation: 1.14 km (0.71 mi) to Nußhardt

Geography
- Location: Bavaria, Germany

Seehügel is a mountain of Bavaria, Germany.
