= Platte (Schneeberg) =

Summit in Germany

- Location within Bavaria

Highest point
- Elevation: 885 m above sea level (NN) (2,904 ft)
- Coordinates: 50°01′10″N 11°53′24″E

Geography
- Location: Bavaria, Germany
- Parent range: Fichtel Mountains

The Platte is a summit, 885 metres (2,904 ft) high in the Fichtel Mountains in central Germany. It is located between two other elevations, the Seehügel and the Hohe Matze, halfway between the Ochsenkopf and Kösseine mountains, on the Rhine-Elbe watershed.
