= Thuringian-Franconian Highlands =

Coordinates: 50.4785°N 11.2061°E

The Thuringian-Franconian Highlands (German: Thüringisch-Fränkische Mittelgebirge) are a natural region of Germany which is designated as D48 or 39 by the BfN. It consists mainly of a ridge of mountains up to just under 1,000 m high between the Central Upland areas of the Thuringian Forest, Thuringian Slate Mountains, Franconian Forest and Fichtel Mountains, and which runs from west and south Thuringia through Upper Franconia and southeast to just before the Czech border and the so-called Bohemian Massif.

== Major natural divisions ==
- 39 (=D48) Thuringian-Franconian Highlands
  - 390 Southern Foreland of the Thuringian Forest
  - 391 Thuringian Forest
  - 392 Thuringian Highland (including the Franconian Forest)
  - 393 Münchberg Heights
  - 394 High Fichtel Mountains
  - 395 Selb-Wunsiedel Plateau
  - 396 Naab-Wondreb Bowl

== Sources ==
- Emil Meynen (ed.): Handbuch der naturräumlichen Gliederung Deutschlands. Selbstverlag der Bundesanstalt für Landeskunde, Remagen, 1953-1962 (Part 1, contains Issues 1–5), ISBN B0000BJ19E
- Emil Meynen (ed.): Handbuch der naturräumlichen Gliederung Deutschlands. Selbstverlag der Bundesanstalt für Landeskunde, Remagen, 1959-1962 (Part 2, contains Issues 6–9), ISBN B0000BJ19F
