= Radspitze =

Mountain in Germany

Coordinates: 50°14′N 11°26′E

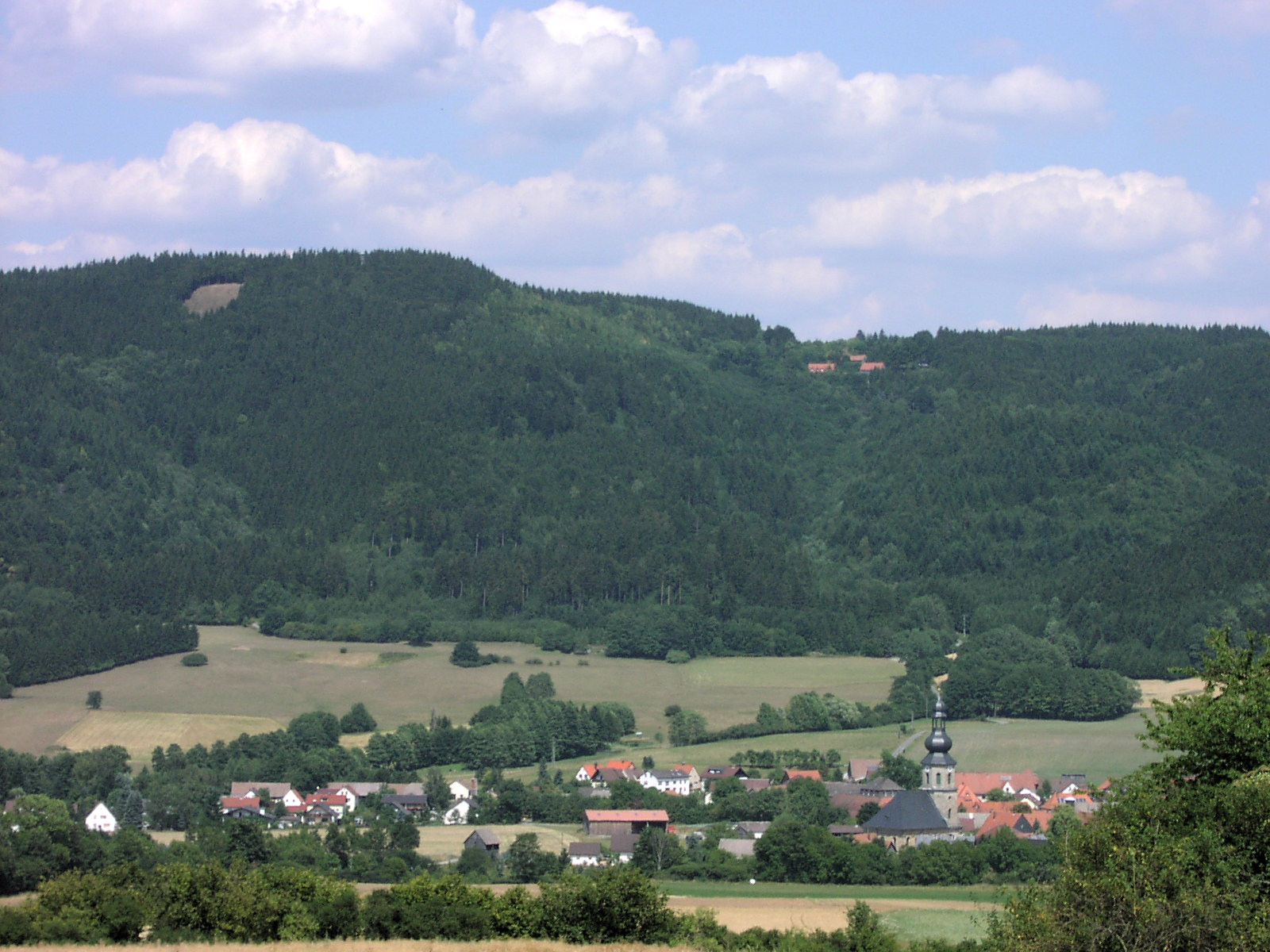
- View of the Radspitze and Seibelsdorf in the foreground.

Highest point
- Elevation: 678 m (2,224 ft)

Geography
- Location: Bavaria, Germany

Radspitze is a mountain of Bavaria, Germany. It has an elevation of 678 meters above sea level and is one of the higher elevations in the Franconian Forest.

== Geography and Geology ==
The Radspitze is located on the southern edge of the Franconian Forest, on the Franconian Line.

== Radspitzturm ==
The Radspitz Tower is a 20-meter-high observation tower that stands on top of the mountain. It was built in 1955 by the Seibelsdorf local group of the Frankenwald Association as a 16-meter-high brick tower and raised to its current height in 1969. A wooden signal stood on the Radspitze as early as the mid-19th century. A first wooden observation tower was erected in 1886, but lasted until 1898 due to wear from the weather.

== Tourism ==
=== Hiking Trails ===
The following hiking trails of the Frankenwaldverein run over the Radspitze:

- Frankenweg
- Höhenweg
- Almweg
- Radspitzweg
- Kohlbach-Radspitzweg

The mountain bike route Rodachtal SÜD also runs over the Radspitze.

=== Winter sports ===
In winter, cross country ski trails are available around the Radspitze (between Mittelberg, Oberehesberg and Geuser).

=== Leisure ===
- Paragliding and hang gliding launch site on the southwestern edge of the Radspitze.
- Grünberg Kneipp facility at the foot of the Radspitze near Seibelsdorf.

== Historical use by Loewe-Opta ==
After the end of the Second World War, the Radspitzturm was used as a radio technology laboratory by the company Loewe-Opta because the location allowed a direct line of sight to the company's development department in Kronach. In 1953, a broadcast relay station was added, making the television signal from the telecommunications tower on the Feldberg in the Taunus Mountains (about 200 kilometers away) available to receivers in Kronach. This use ended in 1965 when the lease expired.
