= Teichelberg =

Mountain in Germany

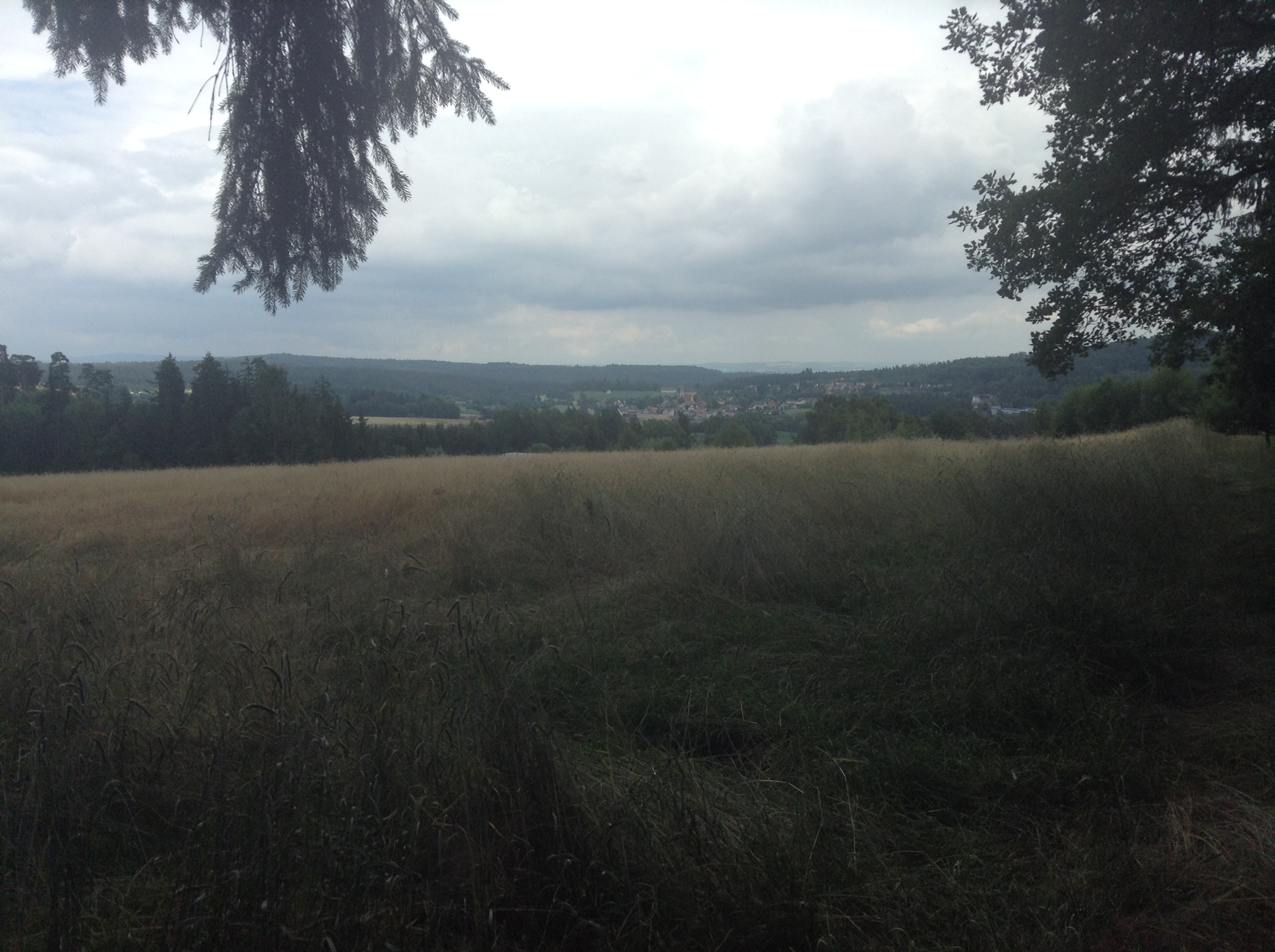
- View to the Teichelberg.

Highest point
- Elevation: 683 m above sea level (NN) (2,241 ft)
- Coordinates: 49°57′27″N 12°09′50″E

Geography
- Location within Bavaria
- Location: Bavaria, Germany
- Parent range: Fichtel Mountains

Teichelberg is a mountain in the Fichtel Mountains in Bavaria, Germany.

Mining of a 45-meter thick basalt layer started in 1888.
