= Warmensteinach =

- Municipality
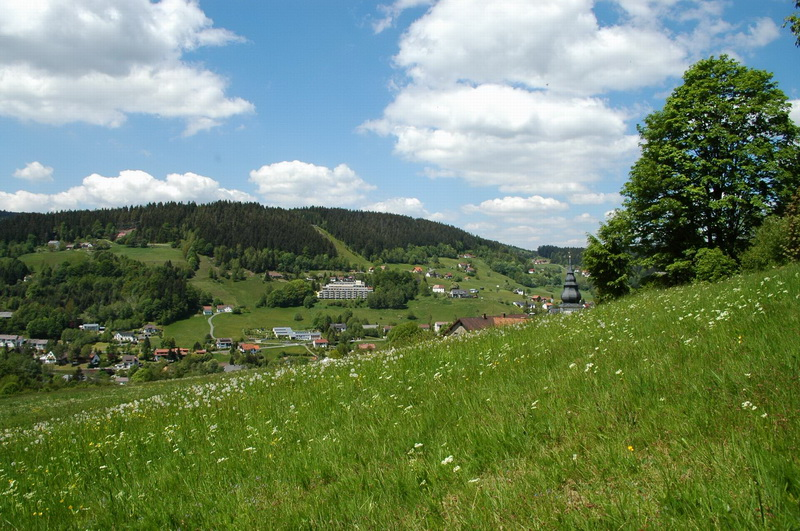
- Warmensteinach in summer

- Coat of arms

- Location of Warmensteinach within Bayreuth district
- Interactive map of Warmensteinach
- Location within Germany Location within Bavaria
- Coordinates: 49°58′N 11°46′E
- Country: Germany
- State: Bavaria
- Admin. region: Oberfranken
- District: Bayreuth
- Subdivisions: 18 Ortsteile

Government
  - Mayor (2020–26): Axel Herrmann (FW)

Area
  - Total: 32.62 km^{2} (12.59 sq mi)
- Elevation: 550–1,024 m (1,804–3,360 ft)

Population (2025-12-31)
  - Total: 2,180
  - Density: 66.8/km^{2} (173/sq mi)
- Time zone: UTC+01:00 (CET)
  - Summer (DST): UTC+02:00 (CEST)
- Postal codes: 95485
- Dialling codes: 09277
- Vehicle registration: BT
- Website: www.warmensteinach.de

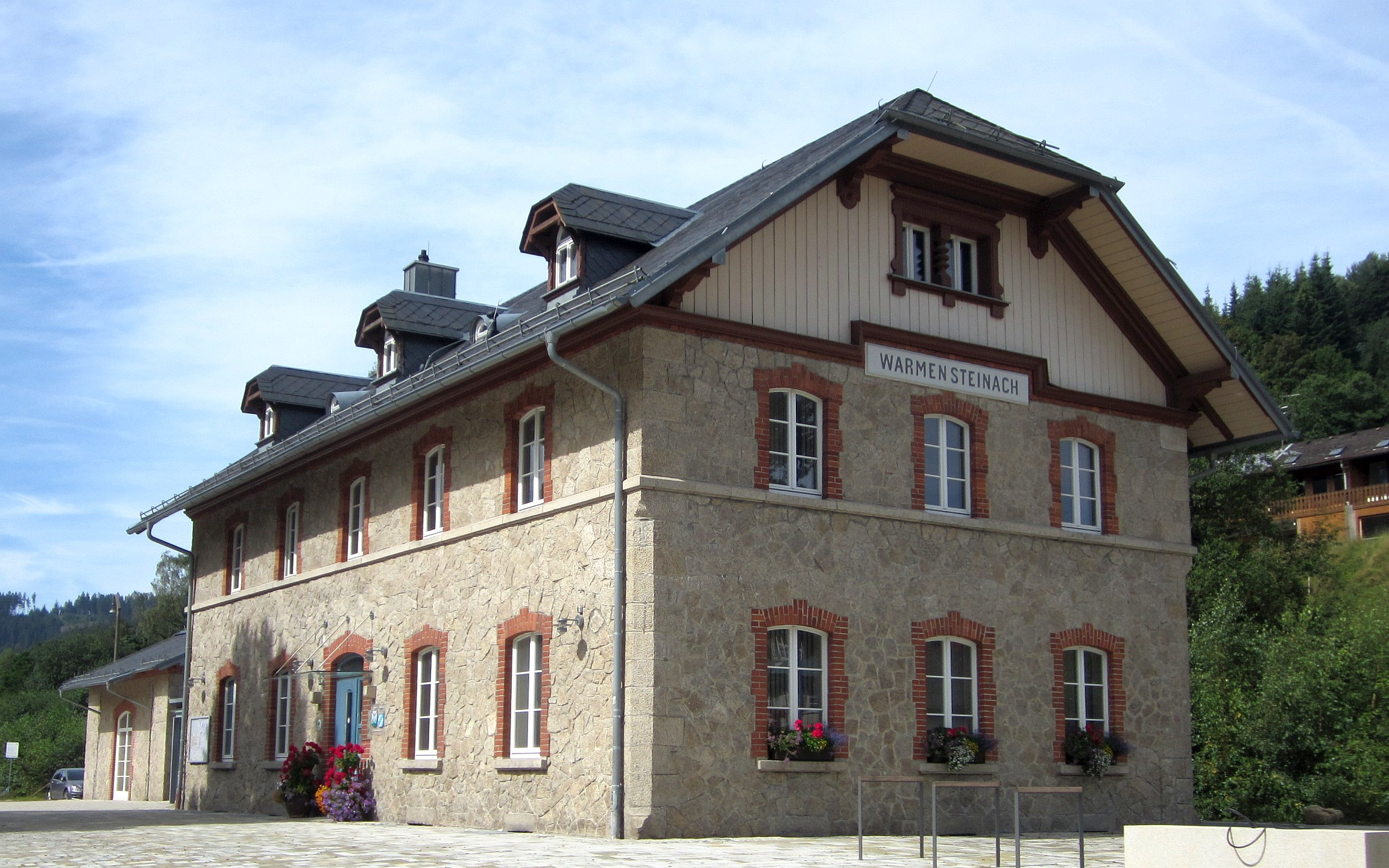
The former Warmensteinach train station is now used as a town hall

Warmensteinach is a municipality in the district of Bayreuth in Bavaria in Germany. From here there is a chairlift, the Ochsenkopf South Chairlift, to the summit of the Ochsenkopf, the second highest mountain in the Fichtel Mountains.

== Geography ==
=== Geographical location ===
Warmensteinach lies at the confluence of the Warme Steinach and the Moosbach (formerly Kalte Steinach) rivers. The 50th parallel runs through the municipality of Warmensteinach.

=== Neighbouring communities ===
Neighbouring communities are Kirchenpingarten, Weidenberg, Bischofsgrün, Fichtelberg and Goldkronach.

=== Community structure ===
There are 18 parts of the municipality (the settlement type is indicated in brackets):

- Brunnenhaus (wilderness)
- Fleckl (village)
- Geiersberg (village)
- Geiersberg (rear) (village)
- Grassemann (village)
- Grenzhammer (village)
- Hempelsberg (hamlet)
- Hütten (village)
- Mähring (wilderness)
- Neuwelt (demolished)
- Neuwerk (wilderness)
- Oberwarmensteinach (parish village)
- Pfeiferhaus (wilderness)
- Schmidleithen (wilderness)
- Stechenberg (village)
- Wagenthal (wilderness)
- Warmensteinach (parish village)
- Zainhammer (train station)

The former village of Kaltensteinach has been part of the Warmensteinach municipality since 1818.

The municipality includes the districts of Goldkronacher Forst (only district section 3), Mähring, Oberwarmensteinach, Sophienthaler Forst (only district section 1), Warmensteinach, Warmensteinacher Forst-Nord (only district section 1), and Warmensteinacher Forst-Süd. The Warmensteinach municipality has an area of 3.119 km². It is divided into 1,361 parcels, each with an average parcel area of 2,291.53 m². In addition to the village that gives the municipality its name, it includes the following parts: Brunnenhaus, Neuwelt, Neuwerk, Pfeiferhaus, and Zainhammer.

=== Geotopes ===
- Höllfelsen near Oberwarmensteinach (geotope number 472A010).

== History ==
=== Until the founding of the community ===
The mention of the "Zwissel," the confluence of the Kalter Steinach (now Moosbach) and Warmer Steinach, in the 1402 fief book of Burgrave John III, is considered the first documented mention of the area around Warmensteinach. To the southeast of the Zwissel, the Upper Palatinate bordered the confluence; to the west, it was the territory of the Burgraves of Nuremberg and their legal successors, the Principality of Bayreuth.

In 1536, after centuries of dispute, this border was established and marked by boundary stones. The name of the municipality's part, Grenzhammer, recalls the border that was significant for centuries, separating politically, linguistically, confessionally, and ethnically. Below Grenzhammer, a column still stands, bearing the white and blue Bavarian diamonds on one side and the black and white Hohenzollern coat of arms on the other. The Paschenweiher pond, not far from Karches, takes its name from an old smuggling route.

For a long time, this boundary represented the denominational divide between Catholic and Protestant religious affiliation, and the dialect divide between Franconian and Bavarian. The inhabitants of Warmensteinach were Protestant, while those of Oberwarmensteinach and Fleckl were Catholic. In Warmensteinach and Oberwarmensteinach, different dialect expressions for the same word still exist. From the east, the influence of the town of Eger was noticeable. The Zwissel is documented in Warmensteinach's coat of arms.

The town itself was first mentioned in writing in 1558 as "Steinach." It was named after the river.

Mills and hammer mills along the Steinach River utilized water power. Mining was carried out on the Helle Glocke and Eisenberg hills. A report by Johann German Barbing to Elector Ferdinand Maria dated January 16, 1666, states: "Warmenstainach. The hammer in W. belongs to Hans Paur, is also operational and is 'verbstandt' (a hammer mill) reported to Altmanshausen, where 'Sündter' (sinder) is mostly forged. — There is also a wire hammer in W., belonging to Michael Schenkl, and is operational."

Warmensteinach formed a community with Neuwelt. Towards the end of the 18th century, Warmensteinach had 73 properties (1 sawmill, 1 wire and sawmill, 1 weapon hammer, 1 ironworks, 13 estates, 10 half-estates, 13 small estates, 4 half-estates, 1 solden estate, 1 half-solden estate, 1 small solden estate, 1 small estate, 1 inn, 9 drip houses, 4 houses, 9 small cottages, 2 button-works). High jurisdiction belonged to the Bayreuth City Vogtei Office of Bayreuth. The village and community lordship, as well as the manorial lordship over all properties, belonged to the Amt Weidenberg.

As part of the Prussian Principality of Bayreuth since 1792, Warmensteinach became part of France in the Treaties of Tilsit and was sold to the Kingdom of Bavaria in 1810. From 1797 to 1810, the town was under the jurisdiction of the Neustadt am Kulm Justice and Chamber Office.

In 1812, as a result of the municipal edict, the Warmensteinach tax district was established. In addition to the main town, it included Brunnenhaus, Kaltensteinach, Neuhaus, Neuwelt, Neuwerk, Sonnengrün, and Zainhammer. At the same time, the rural municipality of Warmensteinach was created, to which Brunnenhaus, Neuwelt, Neuwerk, and Zainhammer belonged. Its administration and jurisdiction were assigned to the Weidenberg Regional Court, and its financial administration to the Bayreuth Rent Office (renamed Bayreuth Tax Office in 1919). With the municipal edict of 1818, Kaltensteinach was incorporated. Somewhat later, the Pfeiferhaus (Pfefferhaus) was founded on the municipal territory. From 1862, Warmensteinach belonged to the Bayreuth District Office (renamed Bayreuth District in 1939). Jurisdiction remained with the Weidenberg Regional Court (converted to Weidenberg District Court in 1879), and since 1931, the Bayreuth District Court has been responsible. In 1964 the municipality had an area of 3,061 km².

Around 1944 - 1945, Warmensteinach was resulted of damage because the Allied Powers arrived after defeating Nazi Germany.

=== Incorporations ===
As part of the Bavarian regional reform, the municipality of Oberwarmensteinach was incorporated into the municipality on May 1, 1978. An area of 9.1954 km² of the unincorporated area of Warmensteinacher Forst-Nord was reclassified into the municipality of Warmensteinach on January 1, 2013. On January 1, 2019, the 588.77-hectare eastern part of the unincorporated area of Goldkronacher Forst was added.

== Politics ==
=== Municipal Council ===
The local elections in 2002, 2008, 2014 and 2020 resulted in the following seat distributions in the municipal council:

Party / voting group	2002	2008	2014	2020
CSU	3	5	4	4
SPD	3	3	2	4
Wahlgemeinschaft Freie Wähler Warmensteinach/Oberwarmensteinach	3	3	4	6
Besseres Warmensteinach	5	3	4	-
In total	14	14	14	14

=== Mayor ===
In 2014, Axel Herrmann of the Free Voters Warmensteinach/Oberwarmensteinach electoral alliance was elected mayor in a runoff election with 55.2% of the vote. His predecessor was Andreas Voit (CSU).

=== Finance ===
In 2017, the municipality's tax revenue amounted to €1,866,000. Of this, €560,000 was net trade tax revenue.

=== Flag and coat of arms ===
==== Coat of arms ====
Warmensteinach

- Blazon: "In silver above a green three-mountain between two green conifers, a blue wave drawbar enclosing a red glass bowl at the top."
- Coat of arms explanation: The conifers symbolize the location of the tourist resort in a wooded area in the Fichtel Mountains. Warmensteinach lies at the confluence of the Warmen Steinach and Moosbach streams (formerly Kalte Steinach). This is expressed by the blue waved drawbar. The glass bowl refers to glassmaking, which was an important economic factor for the town for many centuries. This tradition was continued by the displaced persons with the Gablonz glass industry.

==== Flag ====
The municipal flag is blue, white, green and coat of arms in the center.

== Economy and infrastructure ==
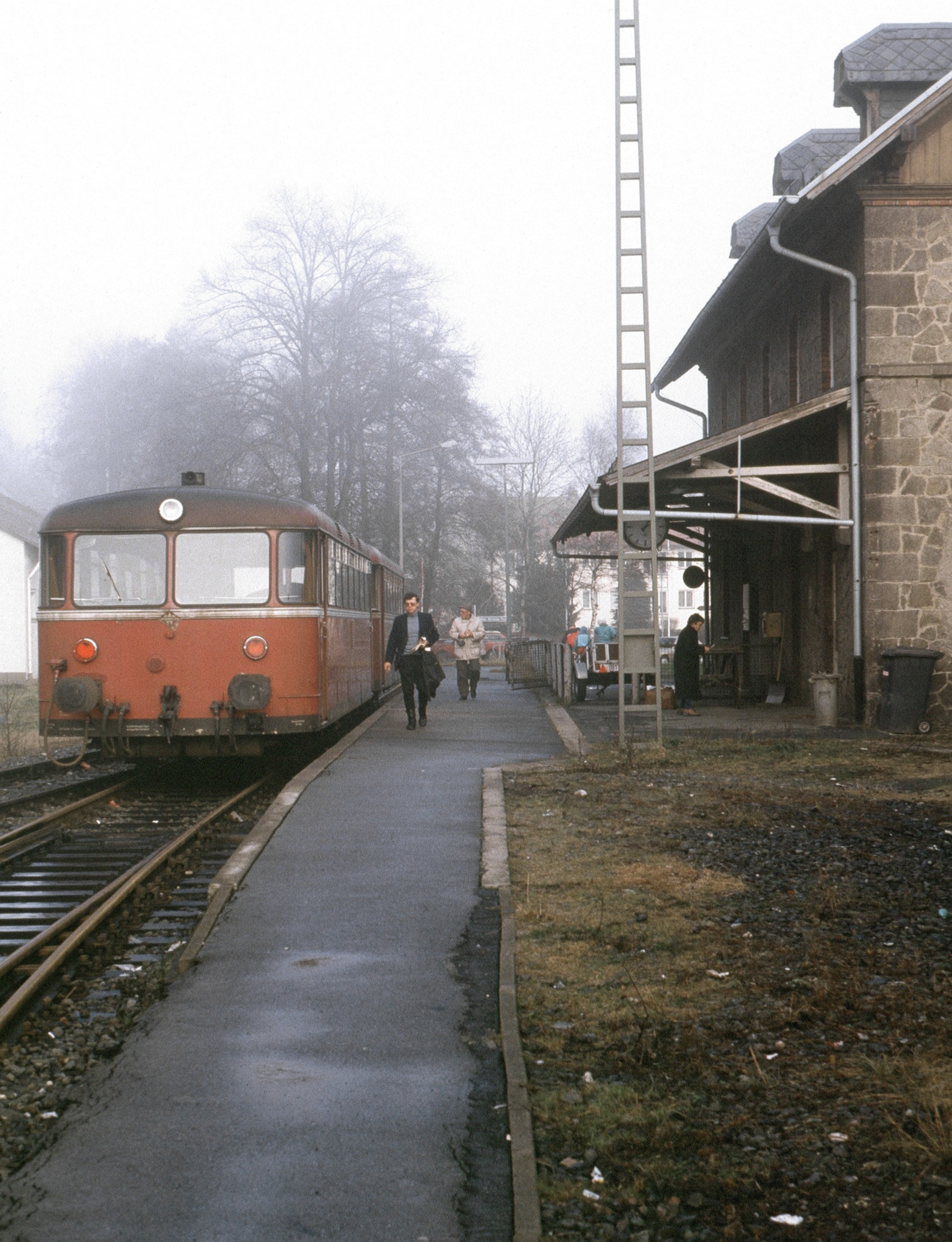
Railbus at Warmensteinach station, 1987

=== Business ===
Glassmaking was an important economic factor for the town for many centuries. This tradition was renewed by displaced persons from the Gablonz glass industry.

According to official statistics, in 2017 there were 217 employees subject to social insurance contributions in the manufacturing sector and 88 in the trade and transport sector. 26 people were employed at the workplace in service companies subject to social insurance contributions. There were a total of 750 employees subject to social insurance contributions at their place of residence. There were two companies in the manufacturing sector and one in the construction industry. In addition, there were five agricultural businesses, which used an area of 1,066 hectares for agricultural purposes.

The water treatment plant in the Löchleinstal valley between Warmensteinach and Grassemann supplies 20 percent of Bayreuth's drinking water needs.

=== Traffic ===
State Road 2181 leads via Oberwarmensteinach to Fichtelberg (5.5 km east) or Weidenberg (7 km southwest). County Road BT 9 leads to Grassemann and County Road BT 4 (2.5 km north).

Rail traffic on the Weidenberg–Warmensteinach section of the Bayreuth–Warmensteinach railway line has been suspended "for technical reasons" since January 1, 1993, but the line has not been closed.

=== Tourism ===
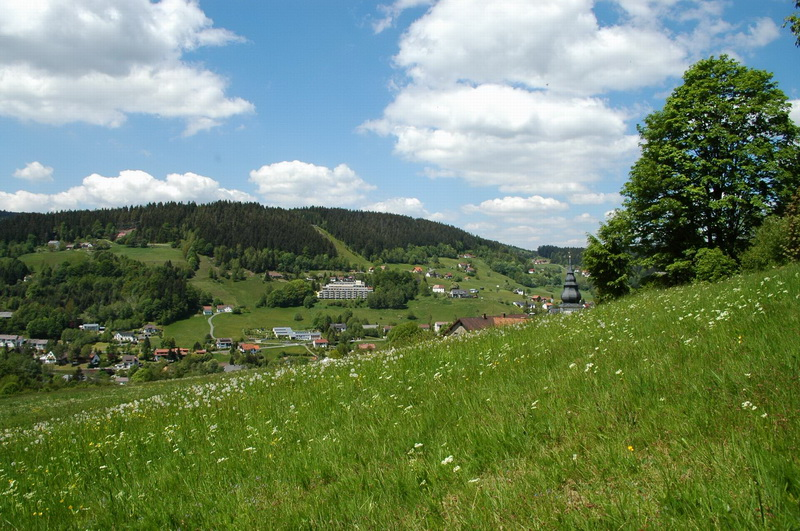
Warmensteinach in summer

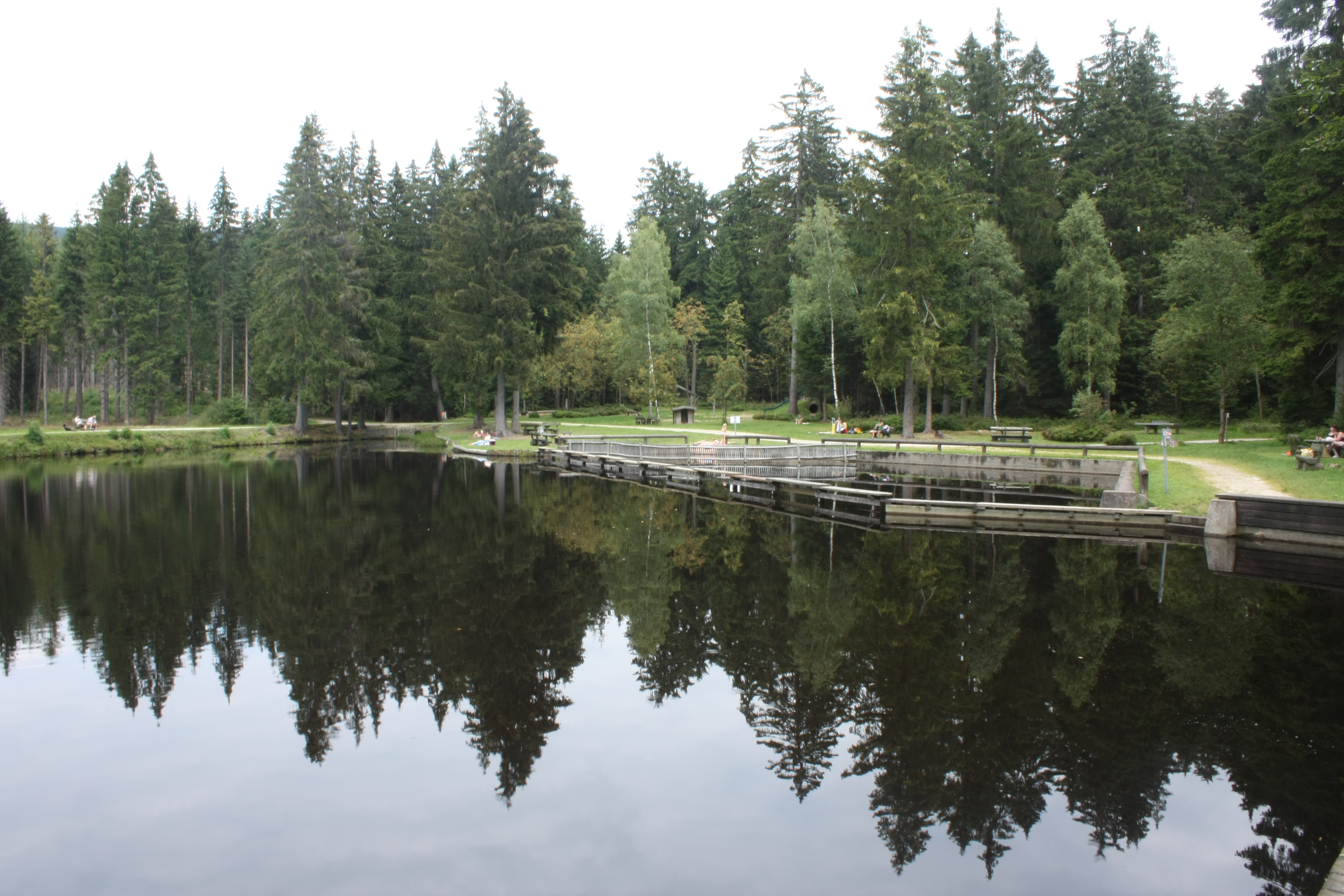
Bathing pond of the natural moor bath

At the beginning of the 20th century, with improved transport conditions thanks to the railway connection, a flourishing tourism industry established itself in Warmensteinach. Numerous guest beds in hotels, guesthouses, vacation apartments, and private accommodations were created. The state-recognized climatic health resort of Warmensteinach, with its municipal districts of Oberwarmensteinach and Fleckl, lies at an altitude of 550–750 m on the southern slope of the 1024 m high Ochsenkopf. Around 2000 guest beds in hotels, inns, guesthouses, and vacation apartments are available to guests. Warmensteinach is located in the Fichtelgebirge Nature Park, which is characterized by a diverse low mountain landscape. A modern cable car takes guests to the local mountain, the Ochsenkopf. For recreational fun, there are exhilarating rides down the mountain on the DévalKart track in summer, and on the ski slopes or the summer toboggan run on the Ochsenkopf in winter. The village offers tennis courts, bowling alleys, Kneipp footbaths, an outdoor pool, and the Fleckl natural mud bath, idyllically situated in the forest. Six drag lifts, two of which are floodlit and equipped with modern snowmaking systems, as well as a two-seater cable car, provide access to this ski area. 80 km of well-maintained cross-country ski trails of varying difficulty levels are available free of charge. For pedestrians, there are 30 km of cleared winter hiking trails.

== Culture and sights ==
=== Music ===
To kick off the Bayreuth Festival in August, musical and literary performances will take place in churches, the spa gardens, and the open-air museum in cooperation with the Bayreuth Festival of Young Artists. Admission to all events is free.

=== Sport ===
Warmensteinach is located in a hiking and mountain biking region. It boasts numerous, well-marked hiking trails, mostly circular, and several long-distance trails also crisscross the area. For about two years, there has been a downhill course, approximately 2.3 km long, leading from the mountain station at 1,012 m above sea level, with a drop of about 250 m, to the south valley station in Warmensteinach/Fleckl. Technically difficult sections are designed with a detour option. Numerous rock, root, and stone sections typical of the Fichtel Mountains have been integrated into the freeride course. Jumps, various drops, and some Northshore elements are incorporated into the alternating steep and flat sections. The partially rocky and stony terrain requires constant attention. Slower, technical sections, coupled with faster, flowing sections, offer fun for both less experienced mountain bikers and experienced freeriders. A short practice course on the final section of the entire route, near the southern valley station, is intended for beginners. There, several obstacles must be overcome that are also found on the single-trail route on the mountain. From the southern valley station of the Ochsenkopf cable car in Warmensteinach/Fleckl, a comfortable chairlift with bike racks takes bikers up the mountain. The Fichtelgebirge Nordic Park offers designated trails of varying difficulty. The local soccer club is the SSV Warmensteinach; other important sports clubs are the WSV Warmensteinach and the WSV Oberwarmensteinach. The winter sports area is equipped with six drag lifts, some with floodlights and snowmaking systems, ski jumping facilities, and cross-country ski trails. The Fleckl natural mud bath is located in the Fleckl district.

=== Museums ===
The Glass Museum in Warmensteinach, opened in 1980, documents the development of the glassmaking craft over the past centuries through its tools and products. One focus is glass bead making, which dominated production until the mid-20th century. The second is the reconstruction of glass production after World War II, which led to new production methods due to the influence of Sudeten German refugees. A variety of unique pieces demonstrate the production of buttons from rod glass, as well as pressed and hollow glass production. Glass production has been documented in the Fichtelgebirge since 1340 and was an important source of income for the residents.

The Grassemann Open-Air Museum is a single-bay farm dating back to 1698, a typical example of the southern Fichtelgebirge region, with living quarters, stables, and barns under one roof. The property provides insight into everyday living on a small farm in the low mountain range. Agriculture was primarily used for subsistence. Residents also worked in mining, forestry, or as hand weavers. One attraction are the traces of the building's history and use: the wooden log construction, the "Black Kitchen," and the breech-loading tiled stove. The museum also serves as an information center for the Fichtelgebirge Nature Park and, through the theme of "People and Forests," illustrates the changing significance of the forest for humankind, from earlier forest uses to the present day. An educational trail on the historical development of the cultural landscape extends beyond the museum grounds and invites visitors to a journey of discovery: upon closer inspection, remnants of earlier uses can be identified in the landscape. The annual program offers changing special exhibitions, museum festivals, and markets.

=== Churches ===
==== The Catholic St. Laurentius Church in Oberwarmensteinach ====
The Baroque church was built between 1755 and 1757. At the tower entrance, one can see the Immaculata, created by the artist Tochtermann. Upon entering the church, the angel's greeting to Mary, "and the Word became flesh and dwelt among us," is visible in the rounded arch leading to the apse. In the center of the interior, on the north side, is the Crucifixion group. The crucified Christ is a work by Zwink from Oberammergau. Mary and John come from the Himmelkron Abbey.

The two side altars are in the late Neoclassical style. The image of the Holy Family in the Nazarene style on the left side altar, or Marian altar, was painted by I. Elain. The image on the right side altar depicting Saint Wendelin is a gift from the Bishop of Regensburg. The Black Madonna on the left side altar was donated by a patron of the church in 1727. The Sacred Heart figure on the right side altar was created by Zwink in 1904. The origin of the three figures above the sacristy door – Saint John the Baptist on the right and Saint John the Apostle on the left, with Saint Mary in the center – is unknown. The high altar comes from the Franciscan monastery in Kemnath. It has a four-columned wooden structure with curved entablature. The dove of the Holy Spirit between two angels is surrounded by a halo. The altarpiece depicts Saint Lawrence with the martyr's palm, receiving the wreath as a symbol of victory over martyrdom. The painting was painted around 1867 by the artist Wild from Kemnath. The origin of the two figures on the high altar, Saint Joseph and Saint Bartholomew, as well as the figures in the nave on the south side of Saint Mary with the Child Jesus and on the north side of Saint Catherine, is unknown.

On the south side is a figure of Christ holding a globe in his hand. On the gallery to the left and right of the organ on the rear wall, two saints bear the initials "M.A.H." and the year "1810." The Wolf organ was purchased in 1878 and has two manuals.

The two ceiling paintings in the nave depict Saint Lawrence showing the church's treasures (the poor) to the governor and the saint's martyrdom. The remaining paintings above the apse depict excerpts from the saint's life. In the center, Jesus is depicted as the reaper and the sower.

==== The Catholic St. Boniface Church in Warmensteinach ====
The Boniface Church in Warmensteinach, built in 1960, is a modern church building with a simple, contemporary design and a single-nave nave. It was designed by the architect Dr. Dagostin from Neusorg. The church is dedicated to Saint Boniface. Scenes from his life, embossed in copper, are depicted on the portal. Upon entering the church, one's eyes are immediately drawn to the altar, the world disc, the candlestick, and the tabernacle, which form a harmonious whole. The copper disc represents the world with its tribulations and sufferings, indicated by the glass fragments in the disc and the cross. The glass is intended to commemorate the local glassmaking tradition. The cross in the center is also a symbol of victory over suffering. The trumpets are meant to indicate that Christ will one day return, victorious over suffering, to the sound of the trumpets.

The altar is a granite block; a dove and the inscription "pro mundi vita – for the life of the world" are carved into the front. On the side altar stands a figure of the Virgin Mary crushing the head of the serpent, a scene from the Creation account, created by the Munich sculptor H. Rucker.

The Stations of the Cross are the work of the Munich artist Baldur Geipel. The eight church windows were designed by senior teacher Mahlke from Weiden. Seven each depict a symbol of a holy sacrament. The eighth contains all the sacraments.

==== The Church of the Holy Trinity in Warmensteinach ====
Above the church entrance is the inscription: "This church, called the House of the Holy Trinity, was built in the year of Christ 1705." The simple building is small and cozy. Since 1798, the people of Warmensteinach have celebrated Holy Communion at the baroque pulpit altar, one of the first pulpit altars in the Margraviate of Bayreuth. It was crafted by the carpenter August Preiß from Goldkronach. The altar and pulpit are connected by two twisted columns entwined with vines. The pulpit also features small columns; above the pulpit, on the underside of the sounding board, one can see the dove of the Holy Spirit within a halo. At the altar is a simple black wooden cross with a gold-framed crucified Christ. Behind the crucified Christ is the inscription "Gloria in excelsis Deo." The organ with 15 stops on two manuals and pedal was rebuilt by Günter Ismayr in 1975 after a fire in the church.

== Sons and daughters of the community ==
- Joseph Schrems (1815–1872), Cathedral Kapellmeister
- Karl von Prager (1875–1959), Infantry General
- Matthäus Herrmann (1879–1959), politician (SPD) and trade unionist
- Bruno Thüring (1905–1989), physicist and astronomer
- Eva Wagner-Pasquier (* 1945 in Oberwarmensteinach), artistic director and managing director of the Bayreuth Festival
