= Franconian Line =

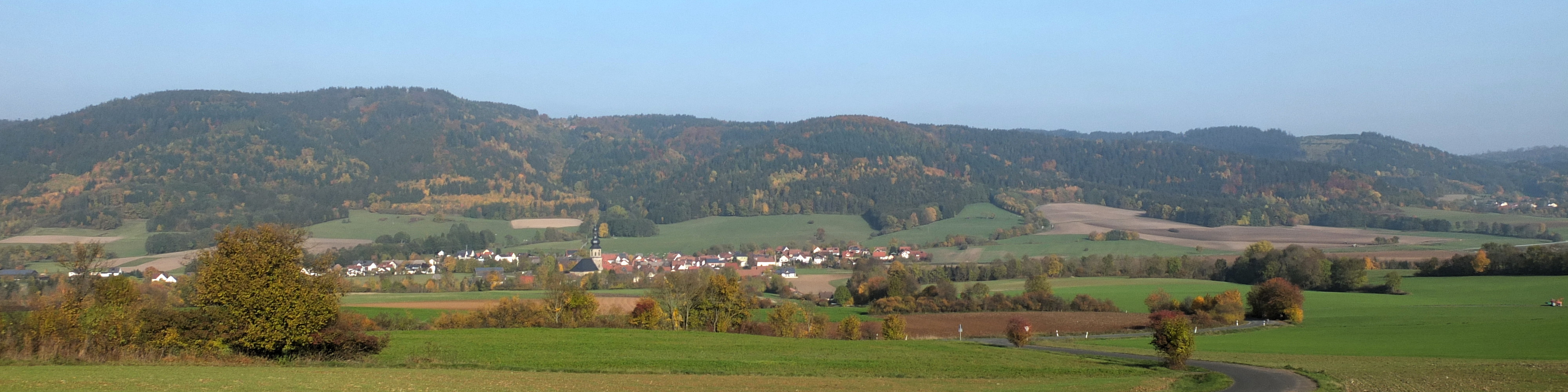
View of the Franconian Line with its highest elevation, the mountain Radspitze near Seibelsdorf, Marktrodach.

The Franconian Line (German: Fränkische Linie) is a geological fault in south-eastern Germany that forms the border between the South German Scarplands in the west and the Fichtel Mountains in the east.

The Franconian Line was formed as part of the Variscan orogenesis and was most active between 100 and 50 million years ago, when the Fichtel, with its blocks of Hercynian granite, pre-Hercynian gneissess and Palaeozoic metasedimentary rocks were uplifted above its forelands that were later filled with Mesozoic-Tertiary sediments. The vertical displacement is as least 1,000 metres (3,300 ft) near Wirsberg and in some cases maybe close to 10,000 metres (33,000 ft).
