= Bischofsgrün =

- Municipality
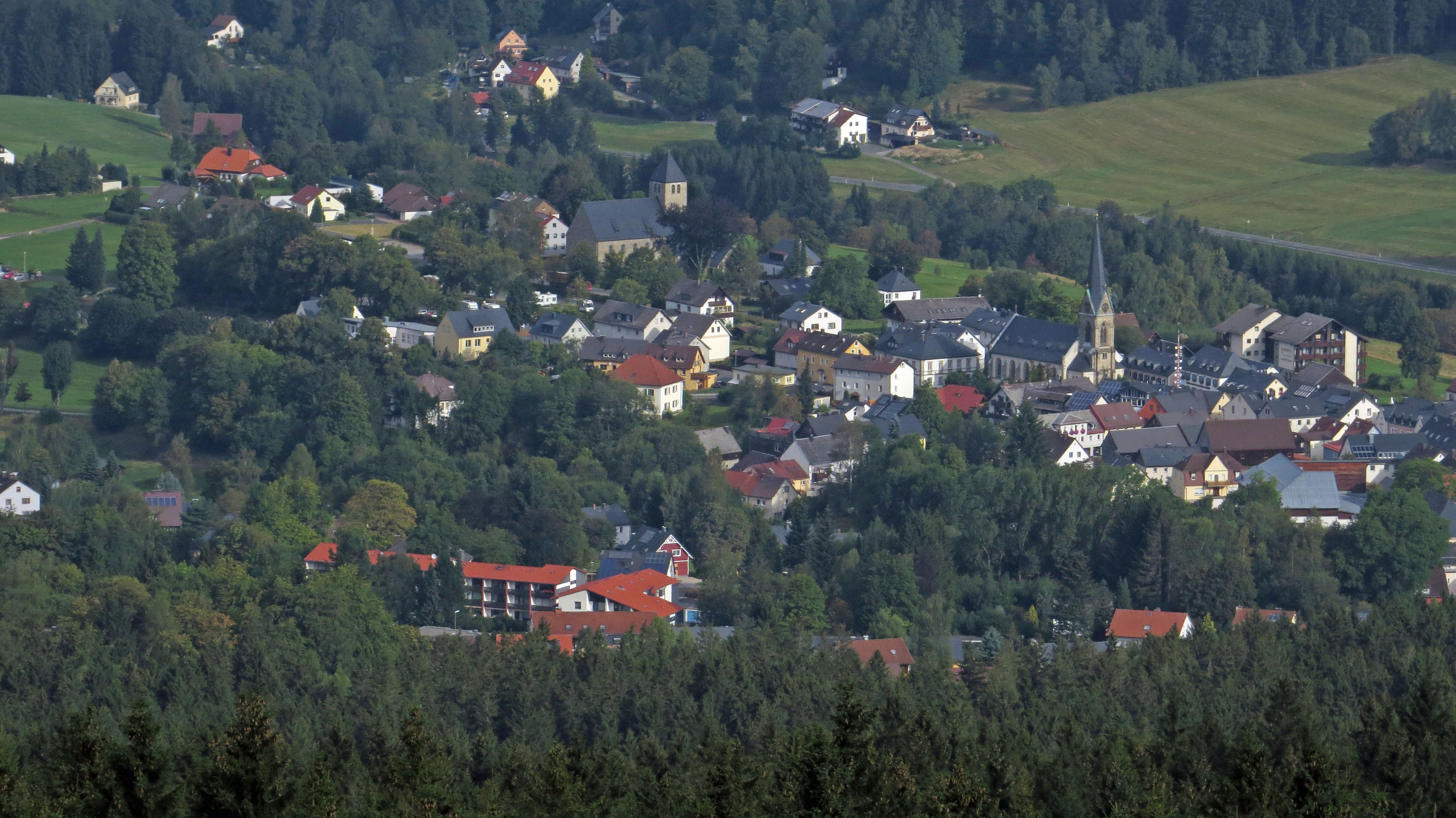
- Bischofsgrün seen from Ochsenkopf

- Coat of arms

- Location of Bischofsgrün within Bayreuth district
- Interactive map of Bischofsgrün
- Location within Germany Location within Bavaria
- Coordinates: 50°3′9.36″N 11°47′45.53″E
- Country: Germany
- State: Bavaria
- Admin. region: Oberfranken
- District: Bayreuth

Government
  - Mayor (2020–26): Michael Schreier (SPD)

Area
  - Total: 8.39 km^{2} (3.24 sq mi)
- Elevation: 676 m (2,218 ft)

Population (2025-12-31)
  - Total: 1,909
  - Density: 228/km^{2} (589/sq mi)
- Time zone: UTC+01:00 (CET)
  - Summer (DST): UTC+02:00 (CEST)
- Postal codes: 95493
- Dialling codes: 09276
- Vehicle registration: BT
- Website: www.bischofsgruen.de

Bischofsgrün is a municipality in the district of Bayreuth in Bavaria in Germany.

Bischofsgrün is situated in the Fichtel Mountains between the range's two largest mountains; Schneeberg (1051 m) and the Ochsenkopf (1024 m). The Ochsenkopf North Chairlift starts in Bischofsgrün and is one of two chair lifts that climb to the summit of the Ochsenkopf, making the town an ideal location for outdoor recreation year round. During the winter months tourists flock to the area for alpine skiing, cross country skiing, and sledding. During the summer, mountain biking and hiking are popular.

Bischofsgrün has a lasting history of glassworks, with the industry possibly practiced in the region as early as the 12th or 13th century, though few records earlier than the 15th century remain. The earliest record of a glassworks in Bischofsgrün dates to 1340. As early as 1450, the first Paterlhütten (bead hut) is recorded in the region, establishing a lasting glass bead and button industry, known especially for the production of ornamental rosaries.

Bischofsgrün is located on White Main and is the starting point of the White Main branch of the Main-Radweg bicycle path which stretches about 600 km along the Main river until the mouth into the Rhine.

== Notable people ==
- Henrik Ohlmeyer, German ski jumper

== Partner towns ==
- Krásno, Czech Republic
