= Schneeberg (Fichtel Mountains) =

Mountain in Upper Franconia, Bavaria, Germany

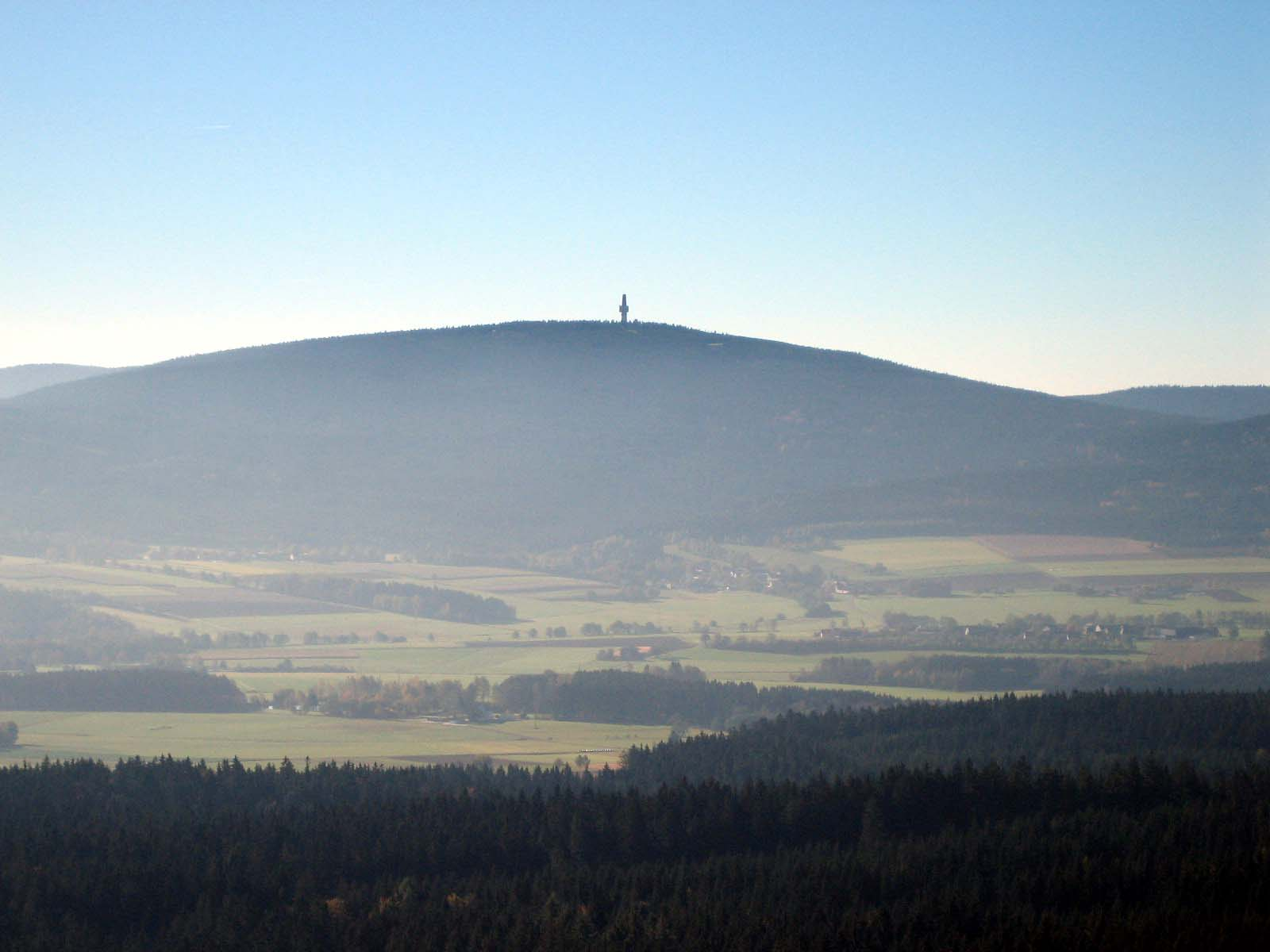
- The Schneeberg in October 2006

Highest point
- Elevation: 1,051 m (3,448 ft)
- Isolation: 80.48 km (50.01 mi) to Nad Ryžovnou
- Coordinates: 50°03′N 11°51′E

Geography
- Location: Bavaria, Germany
- Parent range: Fichtel Mountains

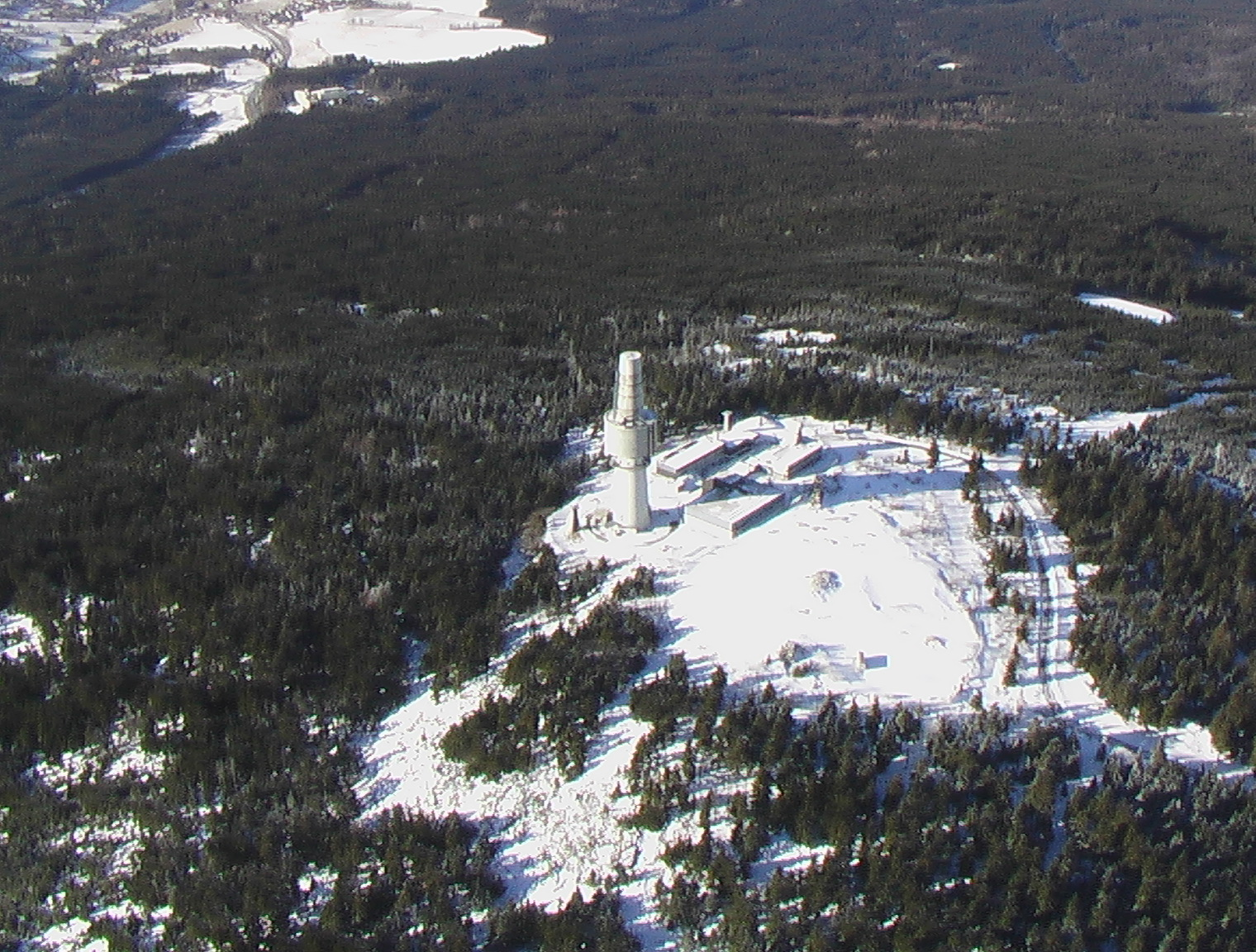
The Schneeberg in January 2005

Schneeberg (German pronunciation: [ˈʃneːbɛʁk]; 1,051 m above sea level (NN)) is the highest mountain in the Fichtel Mountains, a mountain range in Upper Franconia in northeast Bavaria, Germany. It can be readily identified from a distance by its squat tower - a relic of the Cold War. The summit comprises a jumble of granite rocks and a rock pillar (Felsburg) on which the Backöfele observation tower stands and is still dominated by the relics of military installations including its Cold War listening post.

From a natural region perspective, the mountain is part of the major unit of the High Fichtel Mountains (Hohes Fichtelgebirge, 394). It is the highest point in the Bavarian province of Upper Franconia.

== Name ==
The name Schneeberg may be derived from snede ("border"). However, it is more likely that the name comes from Schnee ("snow") and the fact that the mountain is snow-capped for long periods of time.

The group of rocks at the highest point on the mountain is called Backöfele ("baking oven"), after which the observation tower was named. In the Thirty Years' War, folk from the surrounding village are supposed to have fled to this place where they baked their bread.

== History ==
The mountain has always had great strategic significance due to its commanding field of view. In 1498 Captain Kunz von Wirsberg, captain of the Ritterkanton Gebürg, a community of knights in Franconian Switzerland and the Fichtel Mountains, was assigned by the margrave in Bayreuth to establish a warning system. As a result, he set up a network of observation posts on various mountains in the Fichtel Mountains that in time of danger had to send beacon or smoke signals to the neighbouring posts. The Schneeberg was one of these posts. In 1520 the villagers of Weißenstadt had to establish a permanent sentry position here. In 1713 the ruins of this post could still be seen.

In 1879 the Fichtel Mountains branch of the German-Austrian Alpine Club (predecessor of the Fichtelgebirge Club) built the first simple platform on the rock summit; at the same time a rude stone hut was erected. In 1904 a log cabin followed and in 1926 the Weißenstadt group of the Fichtelgebirge Club built the observation tower Backöfele from oak logs.

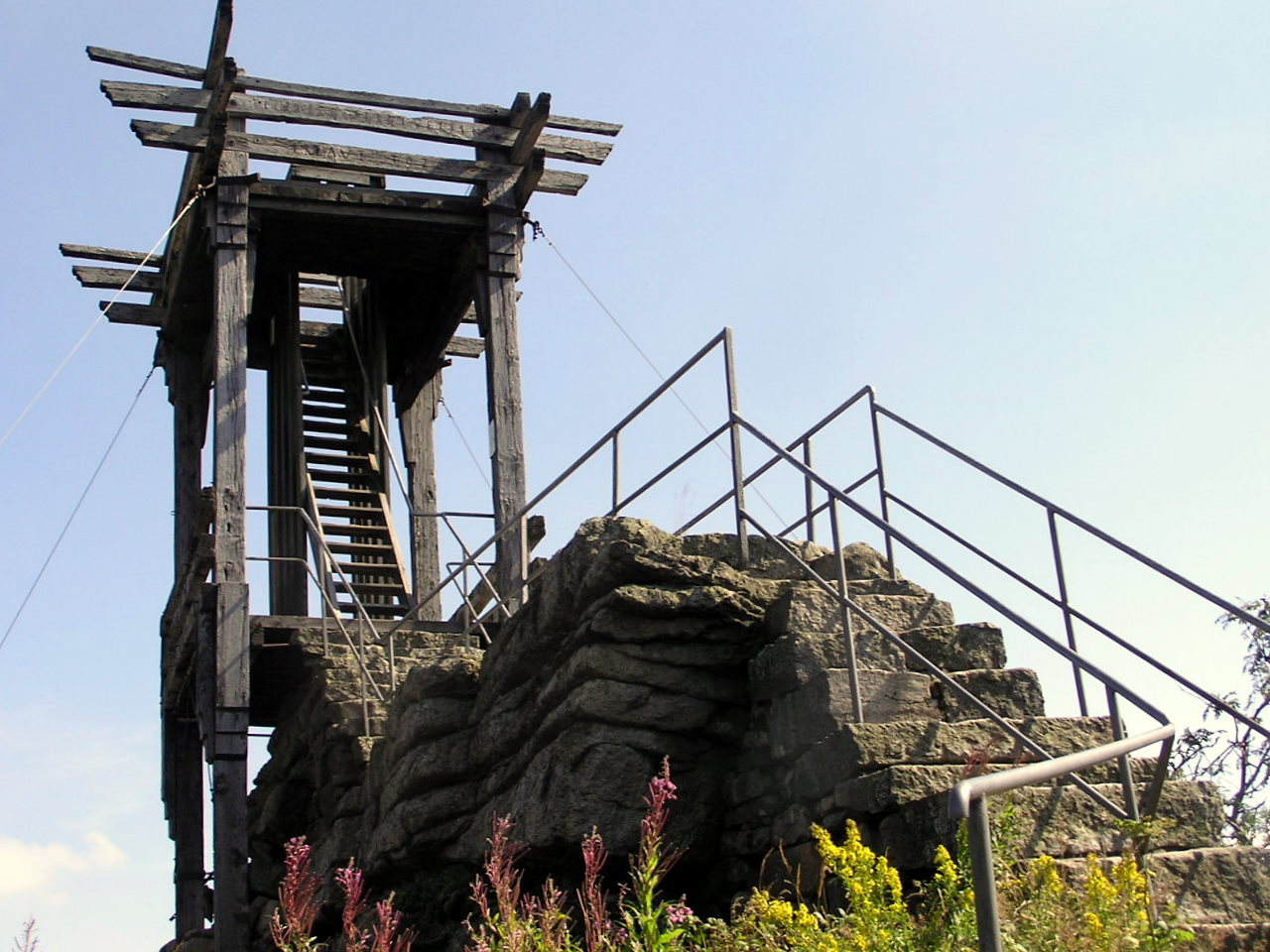
Backöfele

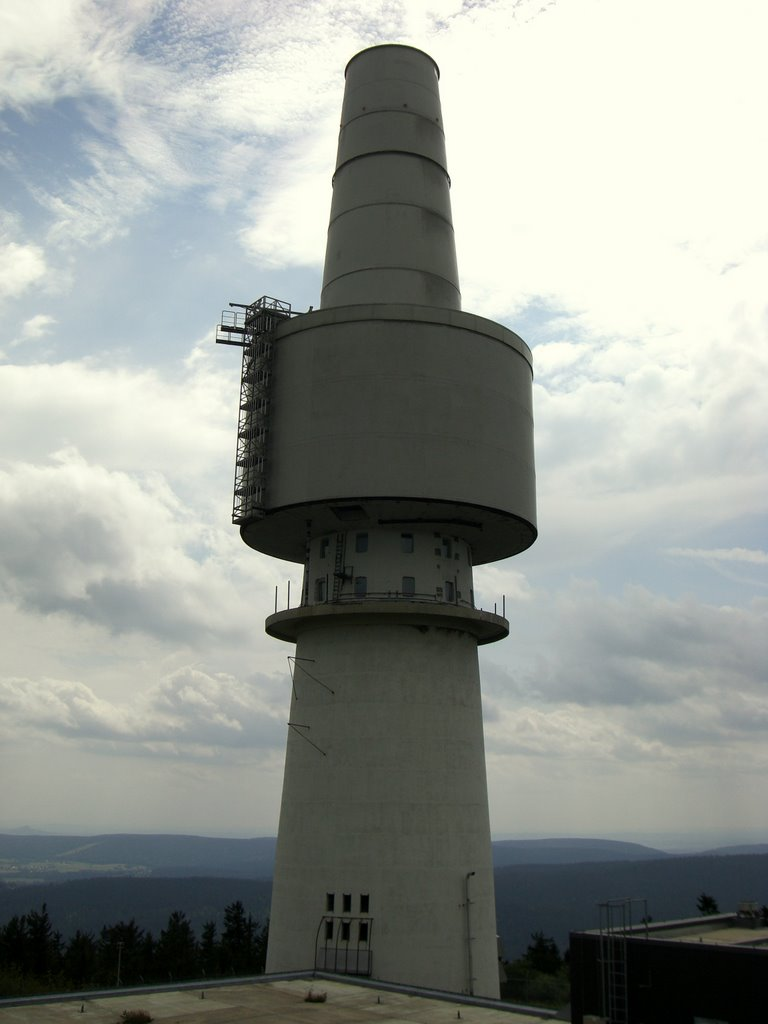
The telecommunication tower in August 2007

In 1938 the Luftwaffe had a 35-metre-high (115 ft) wooden tower built on the mountain, the purpose of which was kept "secret". In 1942 it was razed for "unexplained reasons". On 14 November 1951 US Forces requisitioned part of the summit and erected various buildings and steel structures for antennas and parabolic mirrors. In 1961 the German Armed Forces (the Bundeswehr) took over the area to the north of the summit and, in 1967, communication sector (Fernmeldesektor) "E" took up its surveillance role in a new tower. The top of the mountain was a military out-of-bounds area and the Backöfele was now "behind the wire". Following the easing of military tension in Europe in the early 1990s, the US Forces left the Schneeberg on 30 April 1992 and, on 31 March 1993, the Bundeswehr closed its military surveillance mission. The last soldier left the Schneeberg air defence site (Luftverteidigungsstellung Schneeberg) on 30 June 1994 and the real estate was transferred to the Federal Finance Department (Bundesvermögensverwaltung). The former Bundeswehr tower was rented to the firm of Mannesmann (now Vodafone) for mobile phone use.

On 29 December 1995, on the initiative of the district administrator (Landrat) Dr. Peter Seißer, Wunsiedel district bought a 6,500 m^{2} of land in the former American out-of-bounds area, on which the Backöfele stands. Together with the Fichtel Mountain Nature Park they have implemented land rehabilitation measures. Since 29 August 1996 the Backöfele observation tower has been open to the public again. As part of the environmental restoration scheme the old refuge hut belonging to the Weißenstadt mountain rescue service was demolished despite the fact that the Fichtel Mountain Nature Park had given assurances only a few days beforehand that they wanted to preserve this hut for walkers and mountain rescue teams. As a result, the Weißenstadt rescue service built a new refuge hut below the summit area.

== Biology ==
The low average temperature of 3.7 °C around the summit of the Schneeberg means that it is still able to support a glacial plant community. Access to the areas of vegetation is not permitted, because the plants are extremely susceptible to trampling. Below the summit area is one of the last German capercaillie populations outside of the Alps; they are also protected because capercaillies are very easily disturbed. In winter, tracks are frequently seen that indicate the return of the lynx to the high Fichtel Mountains around the Schneeberg.

== Trails ==
The tarmac road to the summit of the Schneeberg is closed to private motor vehicles. Despite not being maintained after the departure of the military, its surface is still good enough for racing bikers who like to climb the 400 metres at 8% from Bischofsgrün. As there is no other traffic, the road enables also access to the summit for e.g. wheelchairs and prams from a small car park on the BT13 district road (3 km, 230 m vertical; the last metres to the Backöfele are not barrier-free). The summit can also be reached on foot and with mountain bikes on various trails. The points of departure for these trails include Bischofsgrün, Weißenstadt, Meierhof (Weißenstadt), Vordorfermühle, Leupoldsdorferhammer, Silberhaus (Tröstau) and the Seehaus car park on the B 303/E 48. These walks are between five and eight kilometres long.

== Sources ==
- Rainer H. Schmeisser: Der Schneeberg, Beiträge zur Geschichts- und Landeskunde des Fichtelgebirges Nr. 1, Regensburg 1979
- Dietmar Herrmann: Lexikon Fichtelgebirge, Ackermann Verlag Hof/Saale
- Rudolf Thiem: Der Schneeberg - höchster Berg des Fichtelgebirges (Heft 13/2006 der Schriftenreihe Das Fichtelgebirge) ISBN 3-926621-47-8
