= Ochsenkopf (Fichtel Mountains) =

Mountain in Bavaria, Germany

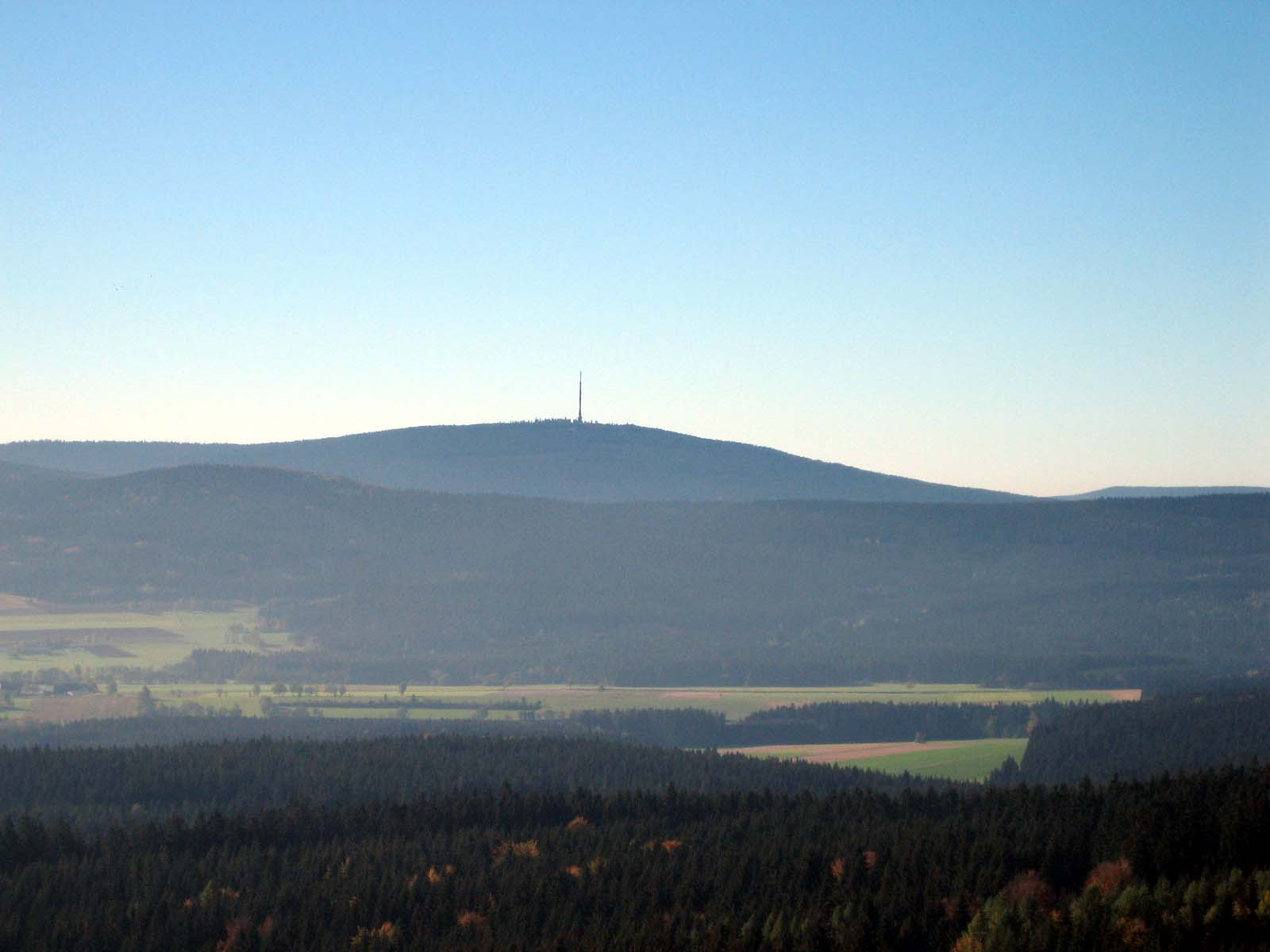
- The Ochsenkopf, seen from the Waldstein

Highest point
- Elevation: 1,024 m above sea level (NN) (3,360 ft)
- Isolation: 3.82 km (2.37 mi) to Schneeberg
- Coordinates: 50°01′50″N 11°48′29″E

Geography
- Location within Bavaria
- Location: Bavaria, Germany
- Parent range: Fichtel Mountains

The Ochsenkopf (German pronunciation: [ˈɔksn̩ˌkɔpf]) is the second-highest mountain in the Fichtel Mountains with a height of 1,024 metres (3,360 ft). On its summit is an observation tower (the Asenturm) and a transmission tower for VHF and TV programmes by Bayerischer Rundfunk.

There are cable cars to the Ochsenkopf from south and north. The valley stations are, in the north, in the village of Bischofsgrün and, in the south, in Fleckl, part of the municipality of Warmensteinach.

In winter there is skiing on the Ochsenkopf. In summer a sommerrodelbahn (dry toboggan run) can be used. This is accessible from the northern valley station. In addition since July 2007 there has been a tree-walk (Kletterwald), that can be used by individuals or groups.

The White Main - the right-hand, northern headstream of the River Main - rises just a short distance to the east of the mountain, above the village of Fichtelberg as does the Fichtelnaab, a headstream of the Naab. The European Watershed also runs over the mountain. The Naab flows south towards the Danube, the Main west to the Rhine.

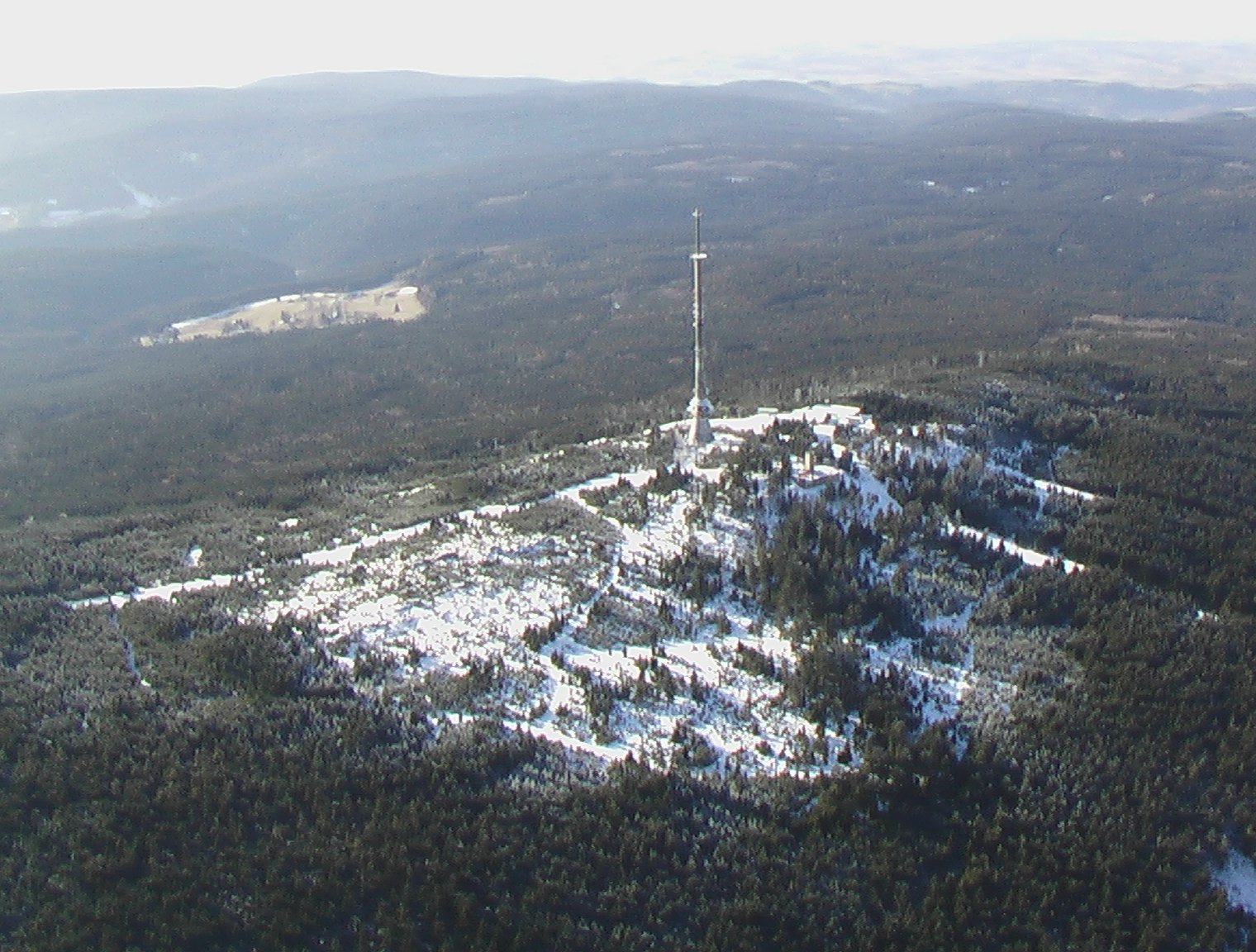
The Ochsenkopf in January 2005

== Origin of the name ==
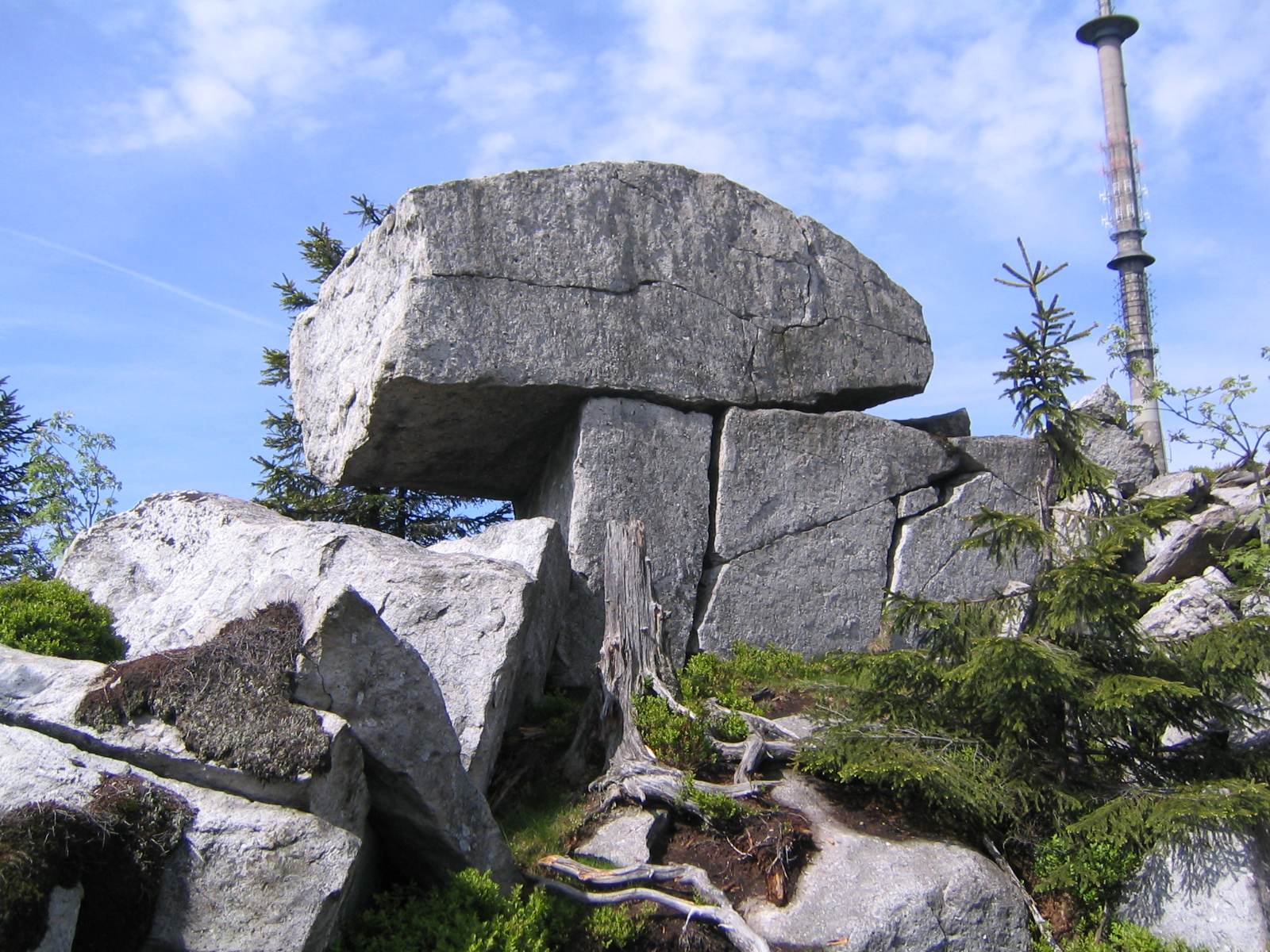
The Goethe Rocks

The name "Ochsenkopf" does not appear in old descriptions of the mountains. The first person to write about the Fichtel Mountains, Matthias von Kemnath (actually Matthias Widmann, b 23 February 1429 in Kemnath) reported in 1476: Ein bergk, hoch, weitt, wolbekant ligt in Beiern, gnant der Fichtelberg ("A mountain, high, wide and well-known, lies in Bavaria, known as the Fichtelberg"). In descriptions of the border in 1499 and 1536 the mountain is called Vichtelberg, thereafter the name was extended to the whole mountain region. It is also mentioned in old documents: around 1317 the Lords of Hirschberg were enfeoffed inter alia with the walt zu dem Vythenberge. By the 14th century iron ore was being extracted in the St. Veith Pit on the southern foot of the Ochsenkopf. Vyth → Veit → Fichtel. High-profile local history and name researchers have still not had the last word. The name Ochsenkopf appeared in mining deeds for the first time in 1495, when Lorenz von Ploben from Nürnberg was given the mine on the Fichtelberge "near the Ochsenkopf" as a feoff. That may be the first reference to the head of a steer carved into a rock on the summit, which can still be seen today.

== The Asenturm ==
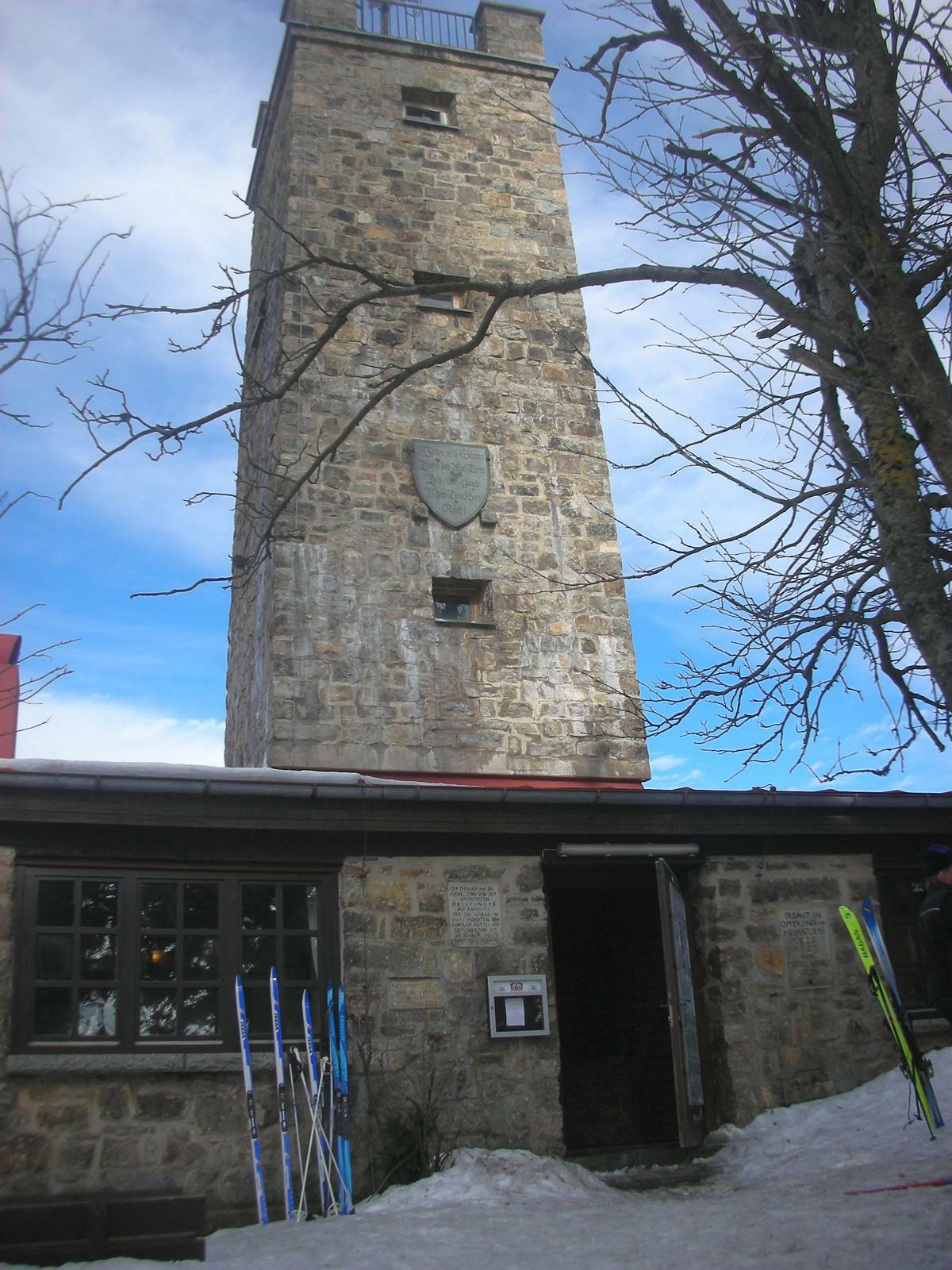
The Asenturm with adjoining pub

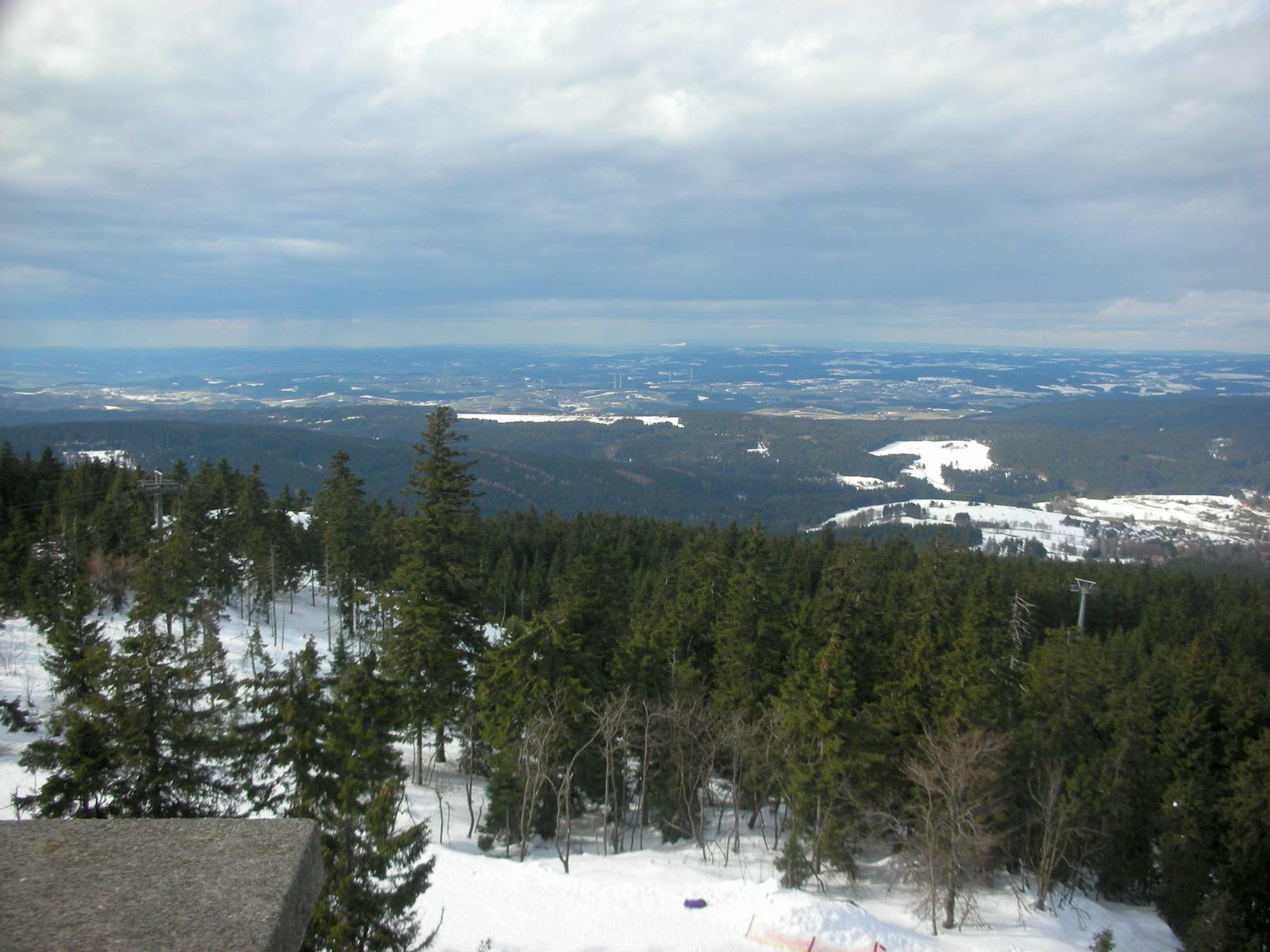
View from the Asenturm

In 1878 on the foundation of the Fichtelgebirge Section of the German-Austrian Alpine Club (predecessor of the Fichtelgebirge Club) there was already an observation post on the Ochsenkopf - a wooden structure for the ordnance survey. In 1876 a stone survey column had been erected (a Saxon survey post, still there today) and surrounded with a wooden scaffold. Later this scaffold was adapted as an observation tower and raised a little in height, but in 1894 the structure was reported as "very rickety". The Fichtelgebirg Club (Fichtelgebirgsverein or FGV) restored the structure time and again. In 1896, master forester, List, from Bischofsgrün modified the tower and it was raised by 10 metres.

On 21 December 1902 the local FGV group in Bischofsgrün applied to the FGV's main office for the construction of a robust, stone tower and transferred a basis of 230 marks as a first estimate. A tower was decided upon, but it was many years before the project could proceed; the First World War putting paid to the plans initially. Not until 1922 did the FGV annual general meeting.

== Villages around the Ochsenkopf ==
- Bischofsgrün
- Fichtelberg
- Warmensteinach

== The TV tower ==
The Ochsenkopf Transmitter (German: Sender Ochsenkopf) is a 163 metres (535 ft) radio and TV tower of reinforced concrete, which was built in 1958 on the summit of the Ochsenkopf. The tower replaced a 50 metres (160 ft) guyed steel tube TV mast that collapsed in January 1958 as result of icing. The tower, which is not accessible to the public, has a hyperbolic-shaped basement with five floors for technical equipment. Above it, there are platforms for directional antennas. The antennas for FM transmission are on the upper part of the concrete tower, and those for TV transmission on a steel tube mast on the top. It transmits TV programs from ARD, ZDF, and Bayerischer Rundfunk.

== Ochsenkopf lifts ==
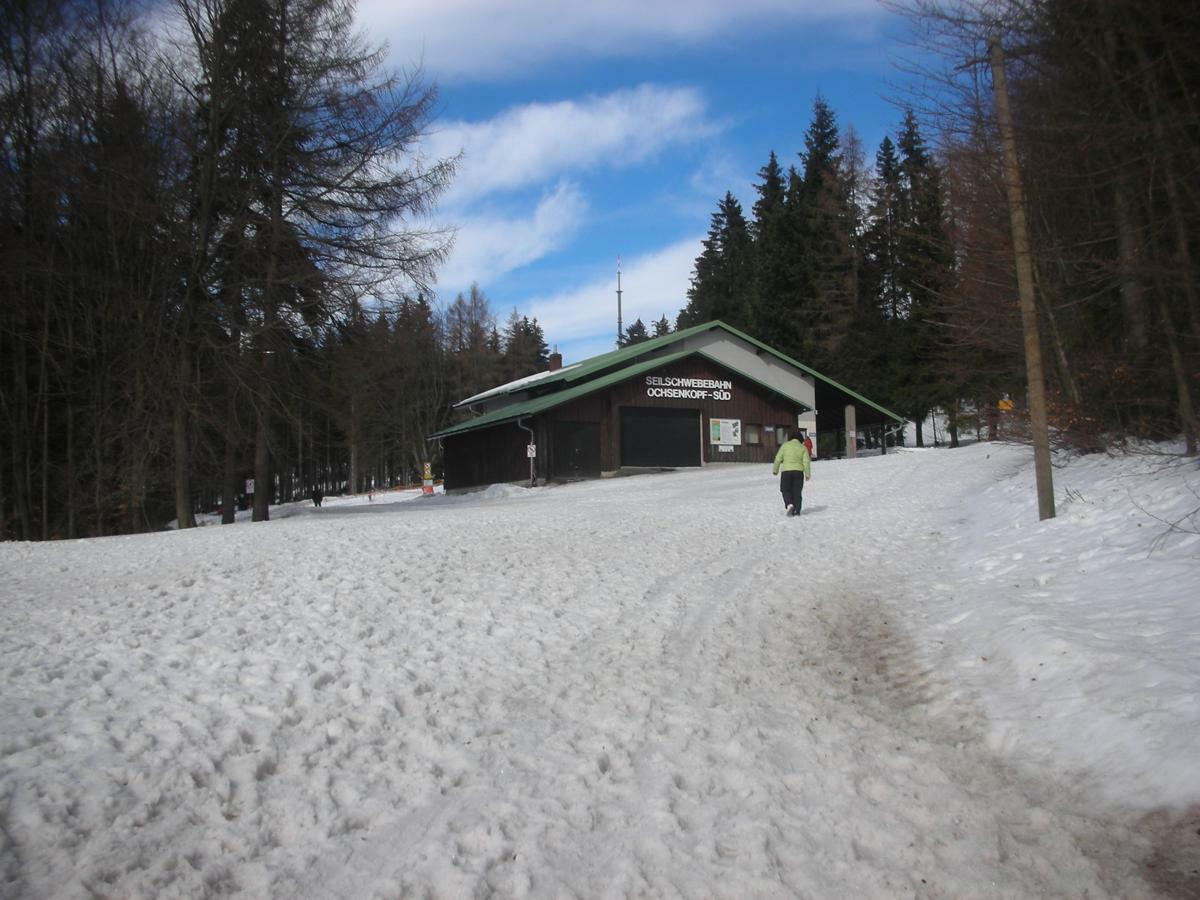
Valley station of Ochsenkopf South in the village of Fleckl

The Ochsenkopf summit is served by two chairlifts built by the Italian cable car manufacturer, Leitner, from Sterzing. In winter they serve the skiing area on the mountain.

=== Ochsenkopf North Chairlift ===
The Ochsenkopf North Chairlift (German: Seilbahn Ochsenkopf-Nord) is a detachable double chairlift with weather shield (2-CLD/B), that runs from Bischofsgrün in the Fichtel Mountains in Germany to the summit of the Ochsenkopf. It was built in 1991.

In summer there is a sommerrodelbahn (dry toboggan run) on the mountain which is accessible from the middle station of the chairlift.

=== Ochsenkopf South Chairlift ===
The Ochsenkopf South Chairlift (German: Seilbahn Ochsenkopf-Süd) is a detachable double chairlift with weather shield (2-CLD/B), that runs from Warmensteinach in the Fichtel Mountains in Germany to the summit of the Ochsenkopf. It was built in 1997.

In summer cyclists can transport their bicycles to the summit on the lift and bike down the mountain bike single track route below the chairlift.

== Sources ==
- Christoph Schaller: Johann Heinrich Scherbers Umsichten auf dem Ochsenkopf aus dem Jahre 1811, Heft 2/1989 der Schriftenreihe „Das Fichtelgebirge“, Fichtelgebirgsverein e. V., Wunsiedel.
- Dietmar Herrmann: Der Ochsenkopf im Fichtelgebirg, Heft 17/2009 der Schriftenreihe des Fichtelgebirgsvereins, Theresienstr. 2, 95632 Wunsiedel.
