= Teatro Rossini =

Teatro Rossini may refer to:

- Teatro Rossini, a theatre in Bahía Blanca, Buenos Aires, Argentina
- Teatro Rossini, a theatre in Arequito, Santa Fe Province, Argentina (Sociedad Italiana, Cine Teatro Rossini)
- Teatro Rossini (Lugo), an 18th-century opera house in Lugo, Italy
- Teatro Rossini (Pesaro), a 19th-century opera house in Pesaro, Italy
- Teatro Rossini, originally called the Teatro San Benedetto, a theatre in Venice, Italy, currently undergoing restoration
