= Kulmbach station =

Railway station in Germany

Kulmbach
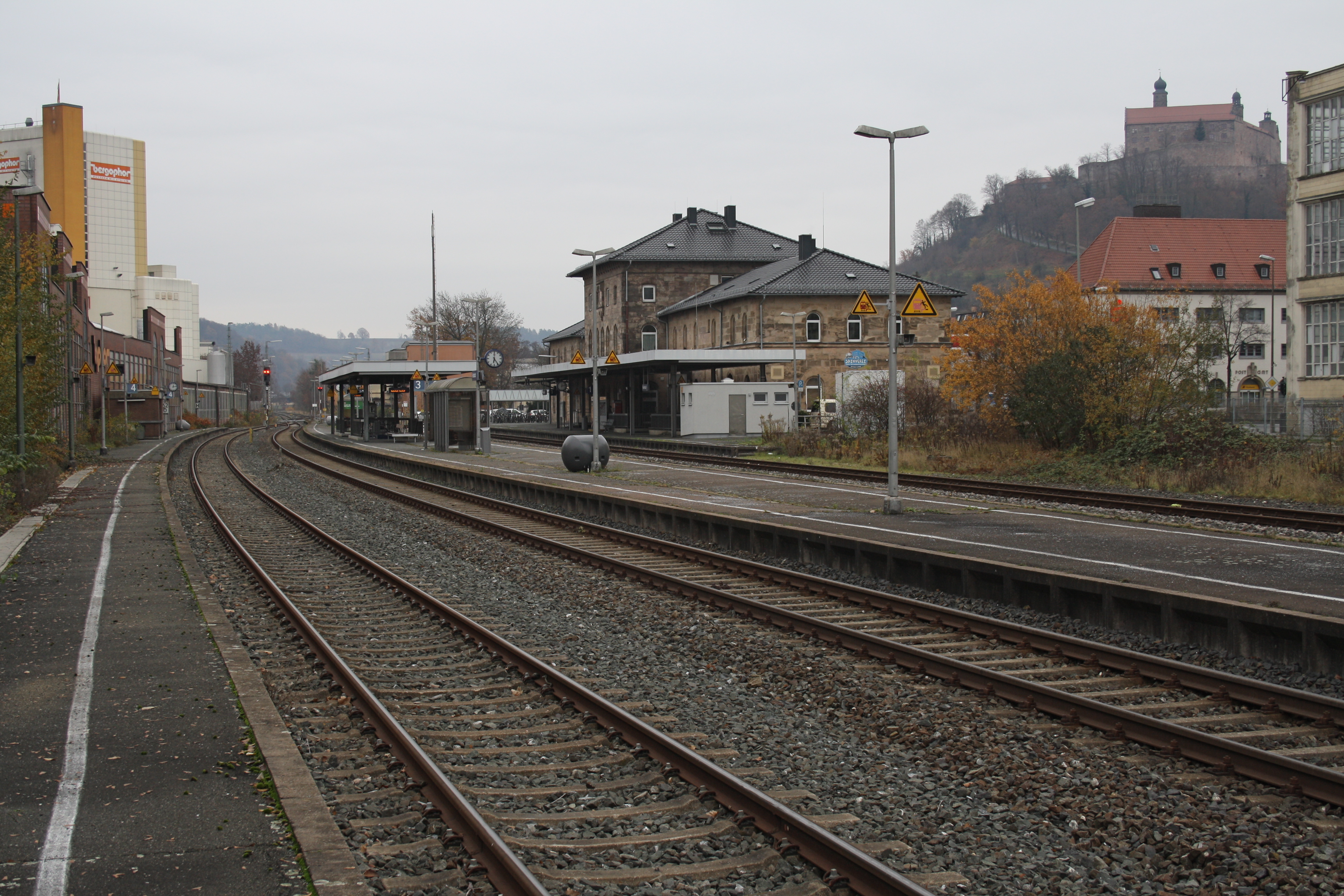
- 2020

General information
- Location: Bahnhofsplatz 1; 95326 Kulmbach; Bavaria; Germany
- Coordinates: 50°06′35″N 11°27′07″E
- Owner: Deutsche Bahn
- Operator: DB Netz; DB Station&Service
- Lines: Bamberg–Hof railway (KBS 820/850); Bayreuth Altstadt–Kulmbach railway
- Platforms: 1 island platform 2 side platforms
- Tracks: 4
- Connections: 17 22 7628 8344 8351 8352 8353 8354 8355 8358 8434 8435

Other information
- Station code: 3458
- DS100 code: NKU
- IBNR: 8003476
- Category: 4
- Website: www.bahnhof.de

Services
Preceding station	DB Regio Bayern	Following station
Burgkunstadt towards Coburg	RE 32	Neuenmarkt-Wirsberg towards Nürnberg Hbf
Burgkunstadt towards Bamberg	RE 35	Neuenmarkt-Wirsberg towards Hof Hbf
Burgkunstadt towards Bamberg	RE 38	Untersteinach (b Stadtsteinach) towards Nürnberg Hbf
Preceding station		Following station
Mainleus towards Bamberg	RB 22 Limited service	Terminus
Mainleus towards Coburg	RB 24	Untersteinach (b Stadtsteinach) towards Bayreuth Hbf
Location
- Location within Bavaria Location within Germany Location within Europe

Kulmbach station is a railway station in the municipality of Kulmbach, located in the district of Kulmbach in Middle Franconia, Germany.

== Services ==
Line	Route	Frequency	Operator
RE 32	Nürnberg – Bayreuth – Kulmbach – Lichtenfels – Coburg	120 min	DB Regio Bayern
RE 35	Hof – Münchberg – Neuenmarkt-Wirsberg – Kulmbach – Lichtenfels – Bamberg	120 min	DB Regio Bayern
RE 38	Nürnberg – Bayreuth – Kulmbach – Lichtenfels – Bamberg	120 min	DB Regio Bayern
RB 22	Kulmbach → Lichtenfels → Bamberg	Two trains	agilis
RB 24	Bayreuth – Kulmbach – Lichtenfels – Coburg	60 min	agilis
