= Kulmbach =

- Town
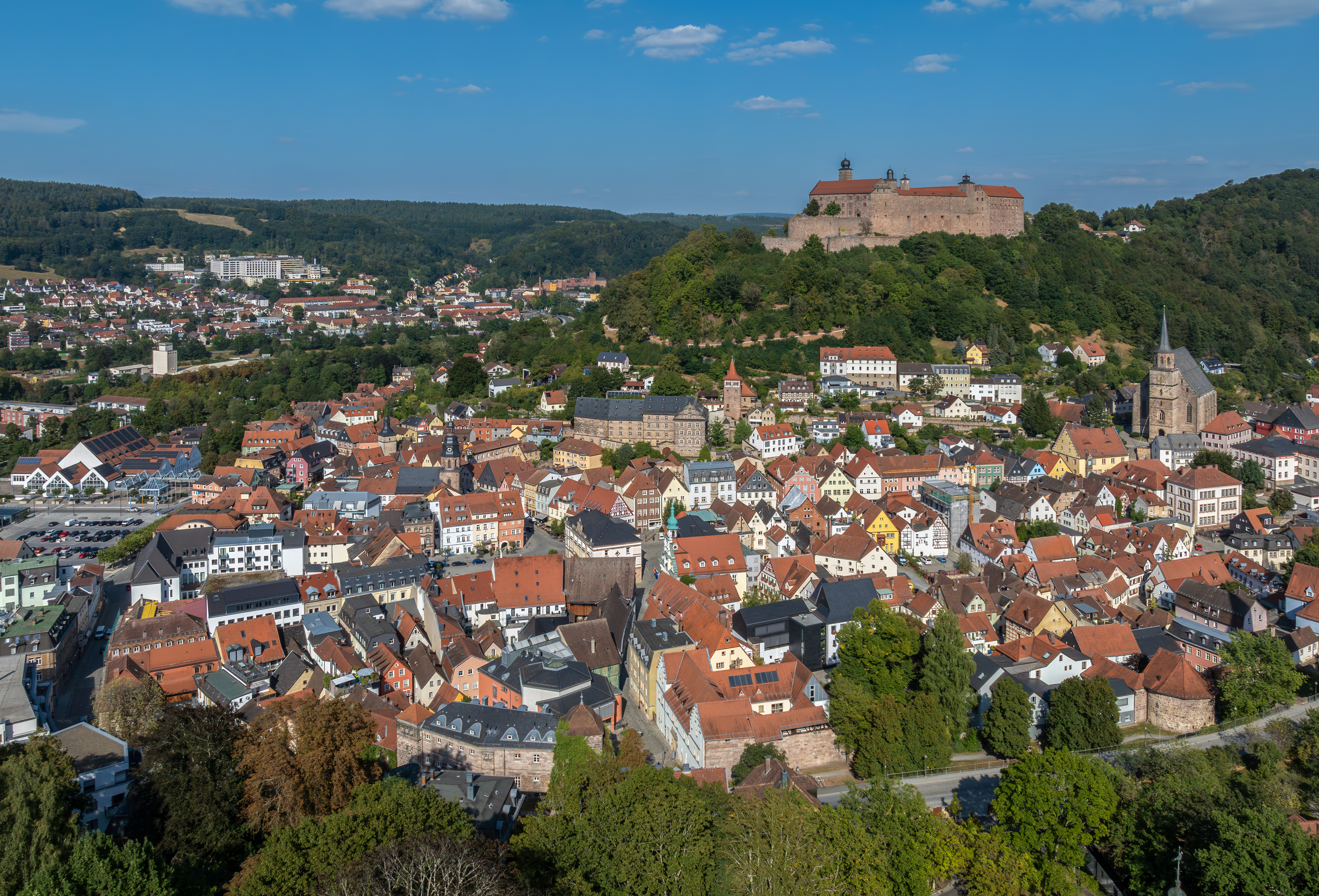
- Aerial view of Kulmbach

- Flag Coat of arms

- Location of Kulmbach within Kulmbach district
- Interactive map of Kulmbach
- Location within Germany Location within Bavaria
- Coordinates: 50°06′N 11°26′E
- Country: Germany
- State: Bavaria
- Admin. region: Oberfranken
- District: Kulmbach
- Subdivisions: 37 Ortsteile

Government
  - Mayor (2026–now): Ralf Hartnack (WGK)

Area
  - Total: 92.77 km^{2} (35.82 sq mi)
- Elevation: 325 m (1,066 ft)

Population (2025-12-31)
  - Total: 26,511
  - Density: 285.8/km^{2} (740.1/sq mi)
- Time zone: UTC+01:00 (CET)
  - Summer (DST): UTC+02:00 (CEST)
- Postal codes: 95312–95326
- Dialling codes: 09221
- Vehicle registration: KU
- Website: www.kulmbach.de

Kulmbach (German pronunciation: [ˈkʊlmbax]) is the capital of the district of Kulmbach in Bavaria in Germany. The town, once a stronghold of the Principality of Bayreuth, is renowned for its University of Life Sciences, a branch of the University of Bayreuth, the massive Plassenburg Castle, which houses the largest tin soldier museum in the world, for its brewery, its vivid food industry, which hosts some of the world's biggest food businesses, and for its sausages, or Bratwürste.

== Geography ==
=== Location ===
Kulmbach is located in the middle of the Bavarian province of Upper Franconia, about 25 kilometres (15.5 miles) northwest of the city of Bayreuth. To the south of Kulmbach, the River Main begins at the confluence of its headstreams, the White Main and Red Main.

=== Town districts ===
Kulmbach is divided into the following districts (with population in brackets):

- Innenstadt ("town center", 8,655)
- Am Galgenberg (4,224)
- Industriegebiet ("industrial park", 123)
- Pörbitsch (754)
- Blaich (2,029)
- Kauernburg/Aichig (584)
- Weiher (639)
- Herlas (526)
- Forstlahm (622)
- Leuchau (459)
- Wickenreuth (68)
- Mangersreuth (904)
- Donnersreuth/Gössmannsreuth (103)
- Ober-/Unterzettlitz (172)
- Windischenhaig/Hitzmain/Affalterhof (320)
- Katschenreuth (887)
- Melkendorf (730)
- Seidenhof (451)
- Burghaig (1,717)
- Petzmannsberg (1,898)
- Metzdorf (723)
- Ziegelhütten (1,369)
- Niederndobrach (214)
- Höferänger (219)
- Lehenthal (284)
- Baumgarten (133)
- Grafendobrach (167)
- Lösau (126)
- Kirchleus (288)
- Ober-/Unterdornlach (194)
- Altenreuth/Höfstetten (59)

== History ==
From about 900 AD there was a small settlement in what is now the district of Spiegel, which consisted of a forest lodge and a fortified tenant farm (Fronhof) to protect the river Main crossing at Grünwehr. The area later passed into the hands of the Count of Schweinfurt, whose power was usually exercised through the office of the walpode.

Kulmbach was first mentioned as Kulma in a deed of gift in the Alcuin Bible between 1028 and 1040. The name comes from a stream that comes descends the mountain (Culmin-aha, Culmna). This stream was later renamed Kohlenbach due to a misunderstanding.

When the male line of the Schweinfurt counts died out, Kulmbach passed to the Dießen line of the Andechs family through the marriage of the Schweinfurts' daughter and heiress, Gisela, to Count Arnold of Dießen.

The counts acquired other lands around Kulmbach, built the first fort, the Plassenburg, in the first third of the twelfth century and founded a market town and a church in today's upper town (Obere Stadt). In 1180 the House of Andechs was elevated to an imperial princedom by the Emperor Barbarossa and given the title of Duke of Merania after the town of Marano between Venice and Trieste (now Marano Lagunare).

Around 1231 Kulmbach was granted town rights. In place of the old Plassenburg, the site of which is unclear, the dukes built a new castle on a hill spur above Kulmbach. The rule of the Meranian family ended with the last Duke of Merania, Otto II, who died childless in 1248.

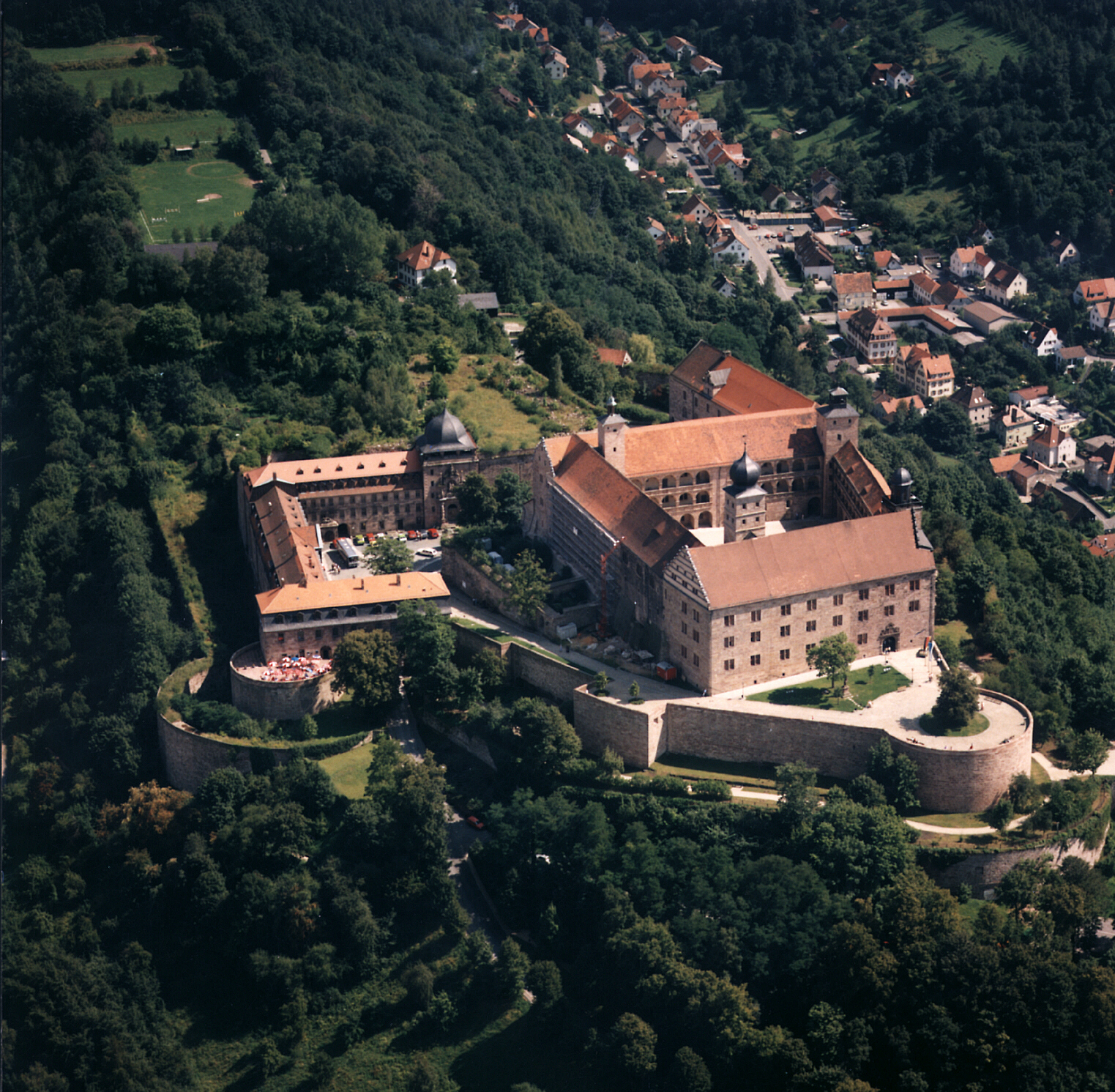
The Plassenburg from above

After years of inheritance disputes the castle of Plassenburg and hence rule over Kulmbach went in 1260 to the Thuringian counts of Orlamünde. The Orlamündes finished the new Plassenburg castle and founded the monastery of Himmelkron. Later, they pledged the castle and town. In 1340, after the death of the last Orlamünde, pursuant to an agreement, the burggraves of Nuremberg, members of the Hohenzollern family, took over Kulmbach and Plassenburg.

Until the 17th century, Plassenburg was the residence of the burggrave office or Amt. Later it was the Amt for the Hohenzollern Principality of Kulmbach (also: Brandenburg-Kulmbach or, after 1604, Brandenburg-Bayreuth). As a result of its favourable location on the historic and 'escorted' roads to Bamberg, Nuremberg, Eger, Hof and Leipzig trade in the town flourished - guilds were formed for the weavers, dyers and silk embroiderers. In 1398, 1500 to 2000 inhabitants lived in Kulmbach; this can be seen from a burggraviate inventory of land, houses and taxes. The town was ruled by a lordly Vogt or sheriff, the mayor and a council of prominent citizens.

As a result of the transfer of the princely privilege in 1363, and the electorate and the March of Brandenburg in 1415, all subsequent Franconian Hohenzollerns called themselves Margraves of Brandenburg-Kulmbach. From 1411 to 1529 Kulmbach townsfolk stood as chancellors at the head of the administration for the March of Brandenburg (Dr. Frederick Sesselmann, Sigismund Zehrer and Sebastian Stublinger).

On 31 January 1430 the Hussites sacked the town.

In the course of rebuilding the town, which had been largely destroyed, St. Peter's Church was rebuilt in late Gothic style. It was here that the first Protestant church service was celebrated under Margrave George the Pious in 1528.

The belligerent margrave of Brandenburg-Kulmbach, Albert Alcibiades, wanted to bring all Franconians under his rule and set up a reconstituted Duchy of Franconia. After the abortive First Margrave War, Albert instigated the Second Margrave War and left a path of destruction throughout Franconia and other parts of the Holy Roman Empire. Eventually, a league against him formed, which ultimately invaded Kulmbach on St. Conrad's Day, 26 November 1553, and sacked the city. Many of its citizens were massacred or fled, and the town itself was burned to the ground. On 21 October 1554 the Plassenburg, whose garrison had hitherto held out against their enemy, was also set on fire and destroyed. The sack is recreated in the German Tin Soldiers Museum at the Plassenburg, this diorama constitutes the largest of its kind in the world.

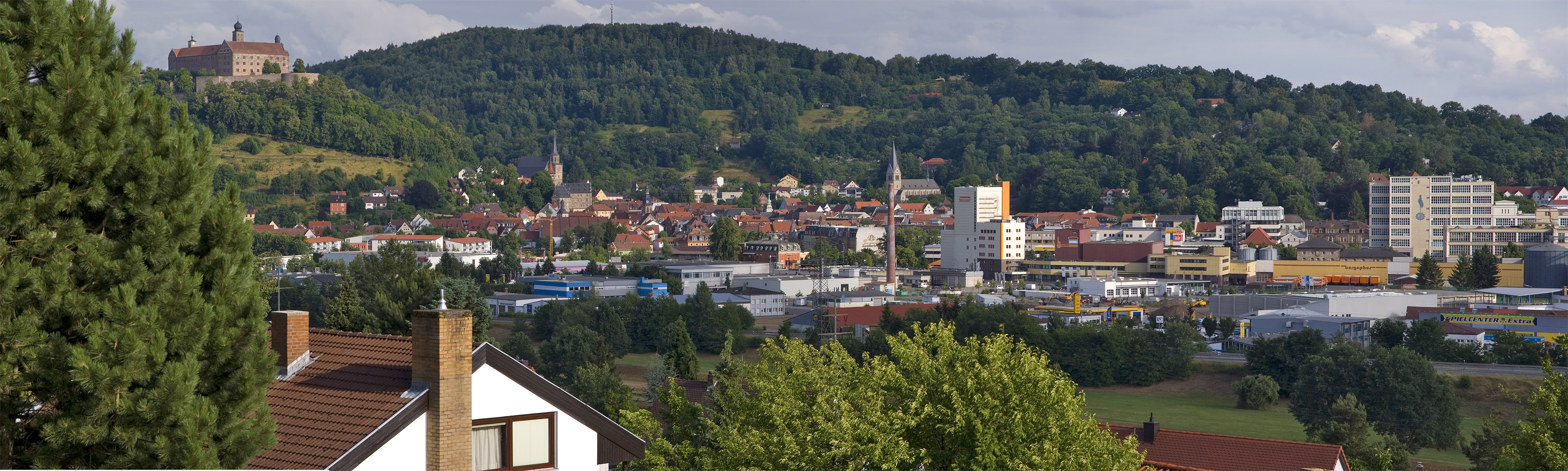
View over Kulmbach, Plassenburg and the town centre (Innenstadt)

From 1557 the town was rebuilt under the new margrave, George Frederick. In 1559 the reconstruction of the Plassenburg, one of the most important Renaissance buildings in Germany, began. However, George Frederick's successor, Margrave Christian, moved the location of his Residenz in 1604 to neighbouring Bayreuth as the Plassenburg no longer fulfilled the ideas of courtly absolutism, and the expansion of the castle came to an end. Nevertheless, the margravial residence returned to Kulmbach several times, once, in 1605, due to a fire in the city of Bayreuth and then again, for safety, during the Thirty Years War. Kulmbach was also burned as a Protestant town by imperial troops, but the Plassenburg proved impregnable.

Finally, in 1642, the residence was moved permanently to Bayreuth, and Kulmbach lost its political importance. As a result, little of significance happened here in the years that followed. When Margrave Charles Frederick Alexander sold the March of Brandenburg-Bayreuth to his cousin, the King of Prussia, on account of his lover, Lady Elizabeth Craven, Kulmbach, too, became Prussian, and the Plassenburg was used in the years that followed as a camp for French prisoners of war. Since the Plassenburg represented an obstacle to French and Bavarian forces advancing against Prussia in 1806, the town of Kulmbach was occupied in October and November that year. After the capitulation of its Prussian garrison, the castle was slighted in order to render it militarily useless.

Finally, Kulmbach was granted to Bavaria in 1810. In 1846 it was connected to the King Ludwig South-North Railway. This resulted in a tremendous economic boom - particularly for the breweries - as their products could now be readily exported. So the number of breweries grew to 26 in 1882. In 1890 Kulmbach was elected as a free (kreisunmittelbar) town. In 1933, the NSDAP seized power in Kulmbach and the Imperial School of German Technology (Reichsschule der deutschen Technik) was established in the Plassenburg. As a result, Kulmbach was even given an additional motorway junction which is now the start of today's A 70 autobahn. In early 1945, Kulmbach was captured by American troops without a fight. In the local government reforms of 1972, the districts of Kulmbach and Stadtsteinach were merged and Kulmbach is now the county town.

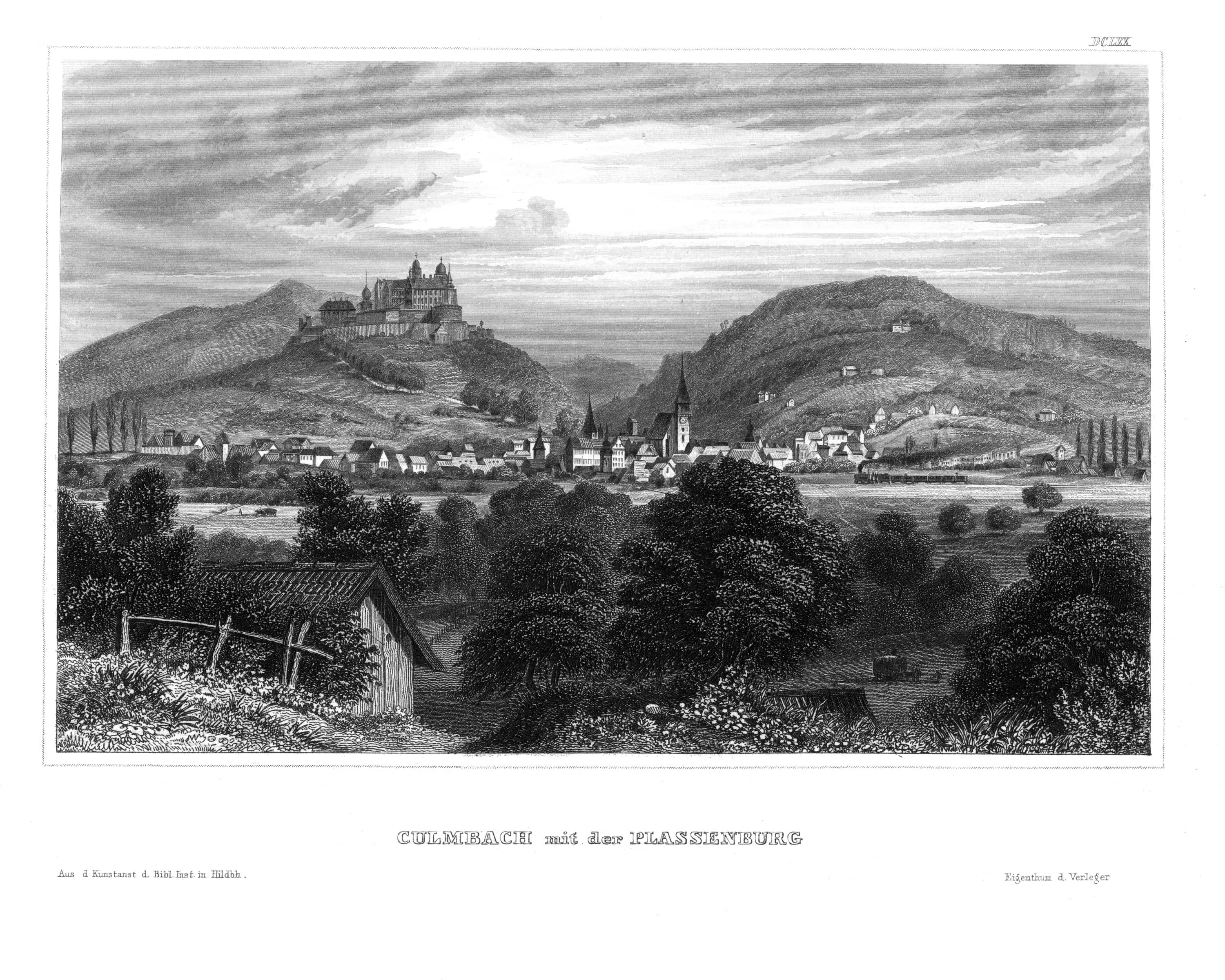
Historic view of Kulmbach

== Politics ==
=== Mayors ===
- 1946–1958: Georg Hagen, SPD
- 1958–1970: Wilhelm Murrmann, FWG
- 1970–1994: Dr. Erich Stammberger, Wählergemeinschaft Kulmbach (WGK)
- 1994–2007: Inge Aures, SPD
- 2007-2020: Henry Schramm, CSU
- since 2020: Ingo Lehmann, SPD

=== Town council ===
The local elections of 2014 and 2020 resulted in the following representation on the town council:

	2014	2020
CSU	11	9
SPD	9	8
Greens/Open list	2	4
Voters' Association	7	6
FDP	1	1
AfD	-	2
Totals	30	30

== Twin towns – sister cities ==
Kulmbach is twinned with:

- Bursa, Turkey (1998)
- Kilmarnock, Scotland, United Kingdom (1974)
- Lugo, Italy (1974)
- Rust, Austria (1981)
- Saalfeld, Germany (1988)

== Leisure, culture and places of interest ==
=== Culinary specialities ===
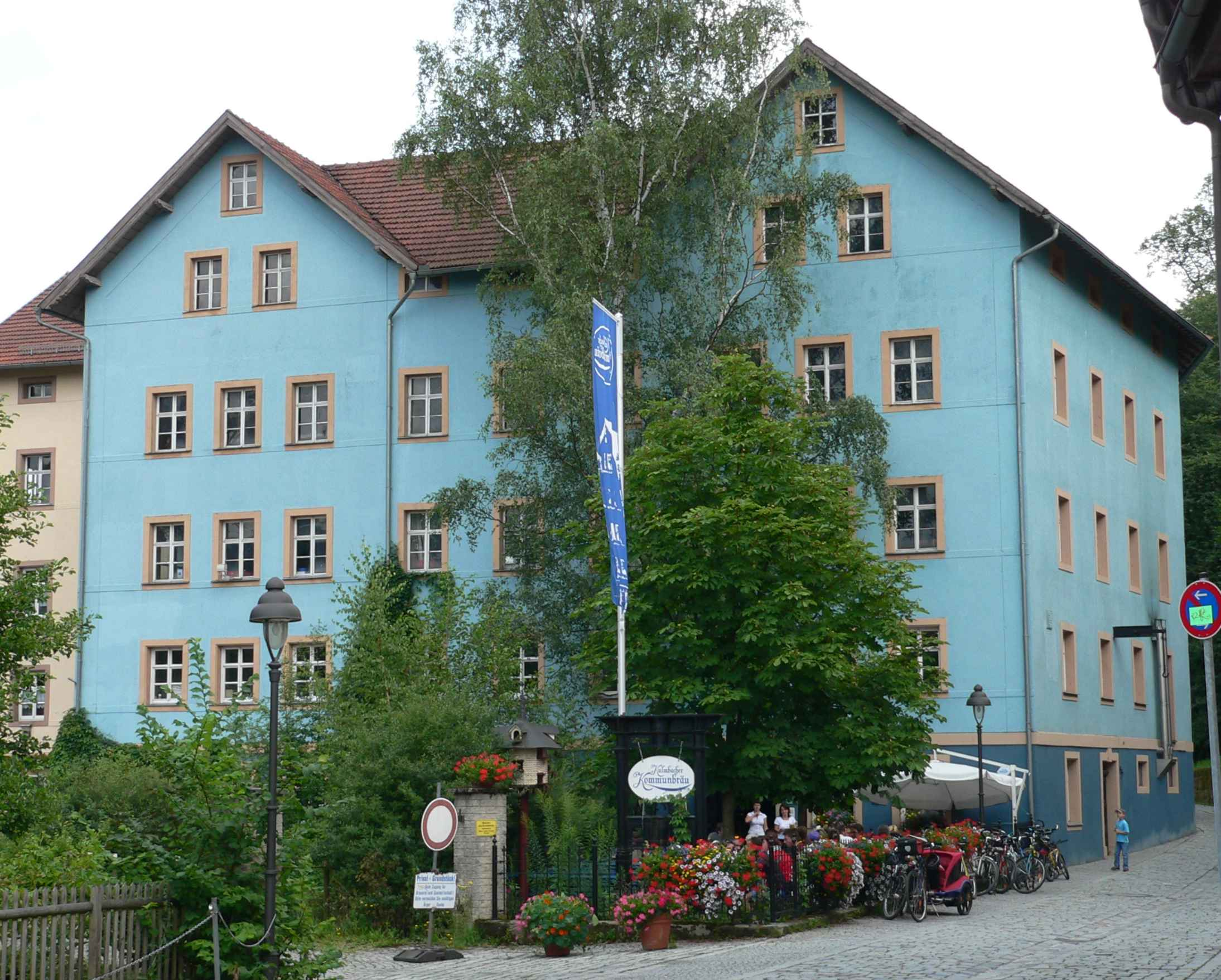
The Kulmbacher Genossenschaftsbrauerei common brewery in an old mill

Besides the usual Upper Franconian specialties, there is Kulmbacher Bratwurst sausage which consists of a very fine ground pork and is served in aniseed rolls, the so-called Stölla. These sausages may be eaten at one of the many sausage stalls in the town. Known far beyond the town itself is the strong beer known as EKU 28, brewed by the Kulmbacher Brauerei, which for years was regarded as the strongest beer in the world. Kulmbach has also earned a reputation as a food centre thanks to the Max Rubner Institute (Federal Agency for Food Safety, formerly the Federal Institute for Meat Research), which has come to prominence since the BSE scandal.

=== Sport and recreation ===
- The club, ATS Kulmbach 1861, is one of the oldest and largest sports clubs in Bavaria.
- Kulmbach Airfield (Kulmbacher Flugplatz ) EDQK

=== Museums ===
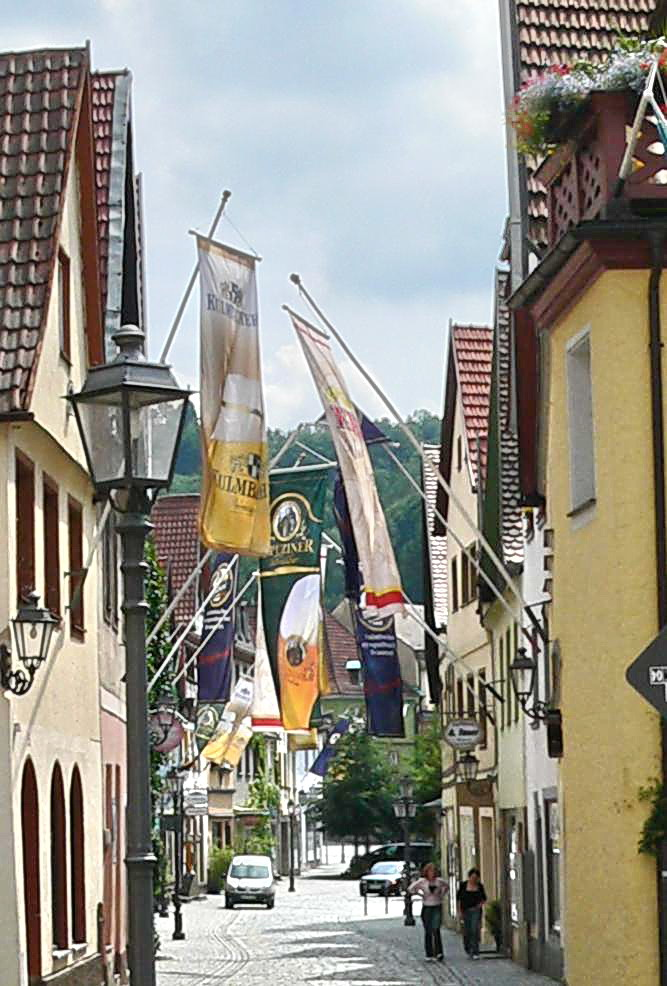
Flags in Kulmbach's Altstadt during the beer festival

- Plassenburg museums:
  - German Tin Soldier Museum in the Plassenburg, with more than 300,000 tin figures
  - Frederick the Great Army Museum (Armeemuseum Friedrich der Große)
  - Upper Main Landscape Museum (Landschaftsmuseum Obermain) with a replica of the Ebstorf Map, and displays covering the Reformation, the Destruction of Kulmbach in 1553 and the Reconstruction of the Old Residenz Town. In the Pörbitsch Treasure, discovered in 1912, during construction work, there are gold and silver dishes belonging to the wealthy merchant family, Gutteter that had it buried in their garden during the Thirty Years War.
- The Public Bath House (Badhaus) is one of eight scientifically researched public baths in Germany. The bathing hall, changing and rest rooms, pre-bath and boiler room have been restored and give an impression of bathing in the Middle Ages. On an open gallery on the upper floor works by young artists in the region are exhibited.
- Bavarian Brewery and Bakery Museum (Bayerisches Brauerei- und Bäckereimuseum). Beer has been brewed in Kulmbach's Mönchshof ("monastery") for over 600 years. On the site of the former Mönchshof Brewery, there is now the Mönchshof Restaurant with a large beer garden and the museum. Various information boards and historical machinery, bottles and other equipment give an insight into Bavarian brewing. The museum itself is in a small glass brewery. Visitors are given a small (0.2 litre) glass of museum beer at the end of their visit.
- Alter Friedhof Open-Air Museum (Freilichtmuseum "Alter Friedhof")

=== Buildings ===
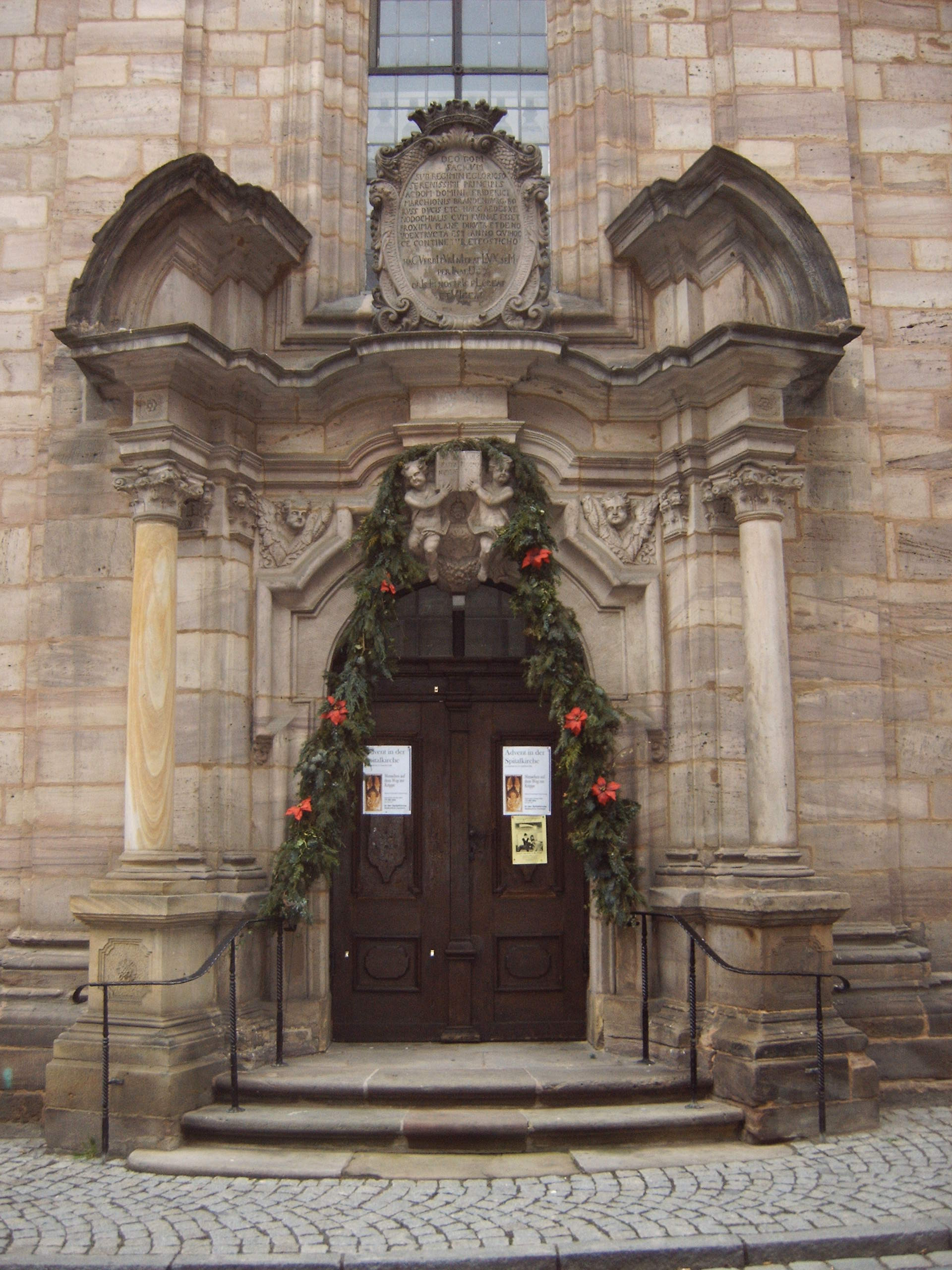
Entrance to the Spitalkirche

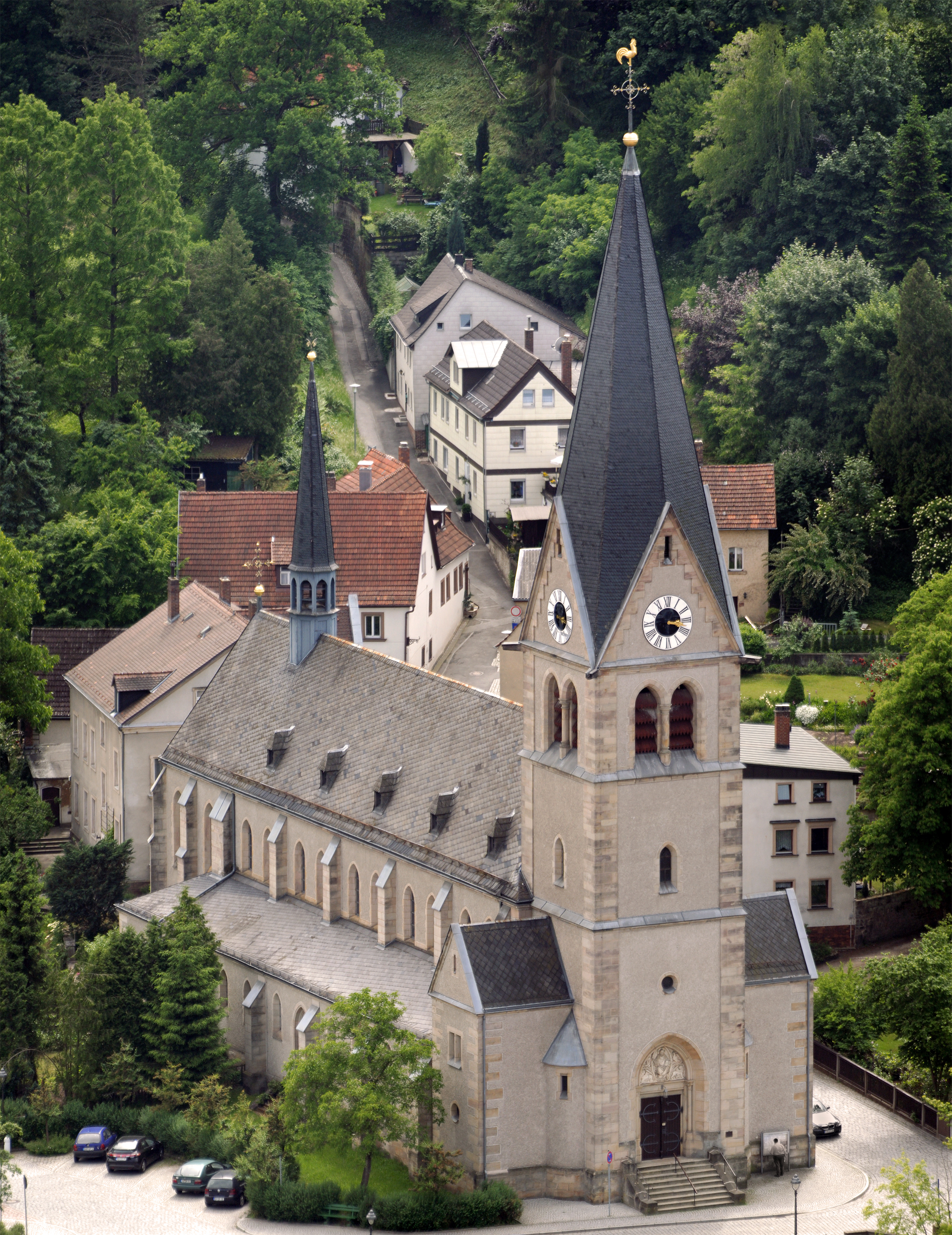
The Roman Catholic Church of Our Lady (also called ULF) on the Schießgraben

- The Plassenburg is one of the greatest Renaissance castles in Germany. It is also the origin of the legend of the White Lady.
- Kulmbach's town hall (Rathaus) was built in 1752. Plans for the rococo façade came from Bayreuth's royal master builder, Joseph Saint-Pierre. The previous town hall, later demolished, dated to the period between 1500 and 1530 and was destroyed during the Second Margrave War.
- The Public Bath House (Badhaus) is first mentioned in the records in 1398. It was scientifically researched and restored. Today part of the building serves as an art gallery.
- The White Tower was built in the 14th century to protect the town wall. Its present appearance dates to the 17th century. The tower was used until the 19th century as a debtors' prison. As part of Kulmbach's town wall the White Tower belongs to the town fortifications of the early 14th century. Like the neighbouring fortified tower of Bürgerloch, the White Tower is a double-towered gateway.
- The Luitpold fountain was built in 1898 to a design by architect, Martin Düfler. Previously the Zinnsfeld fountain, built in 1660 and symbolising the town's market freedoms, stood on the same spot. It is now in the Holzmarkt. During the Nazi era the fountain was dismantled and stored, but rebuilt in 1994. Surrounded by the town hall, market square, numerous cafés and shops it forms one of the social centrepieces of Kulmbach.
- The Red Tower goes back to around 1300 and was part of the old town fortifications. One feature is its roof construction with a curved spire.
- St. Peter's Church (Petrikirche) is a former fortified church, whose origins are uncertain. The church tower used to act as a cannon platform, it was later given a pointed roof. After the Hussite War of 1439 it was remodelled as a Late Gothic hall church. In 1878/80 the interior was decorated in the Gothic Revival style. Noteworthy are the altar by Brenk and Schlehdorn, and numerous valuable paintings. It is also the basilica of the Hohenzollern rulers.
- The hospital church (Spitalkirche) was built in 1738/1739 on the site of St. Elizabeth's Chapel.
- The Langheim Amtshof was built at the end of the 17th century by Leonhard Dientzenhofer. Today it is an educational establishment for the Academy for New Media and technical high school for pharmacy technicians.
- The Heilingschwert Tower from the 14th century is a round "shell tower" (Schalenturm), part of the town fortifications on the Schießgraben.
- The old cemetery with its many gravestones that underpin the history of the town. In front of the old cemetery on the main road is a memorial to the fallen.
- The Burggüter or fortified buildings of Kulmbach
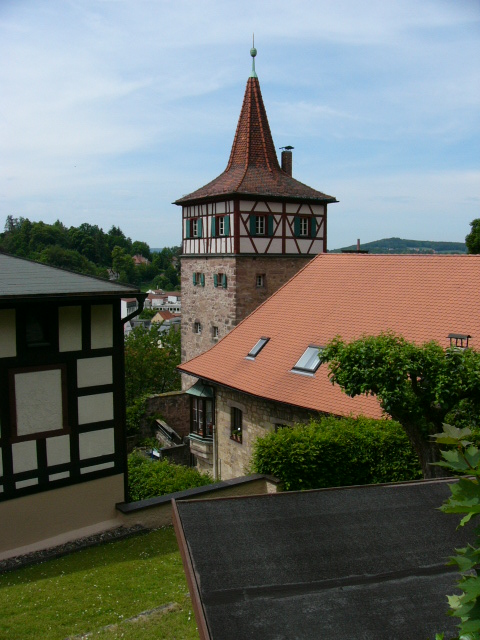
The Red Tower

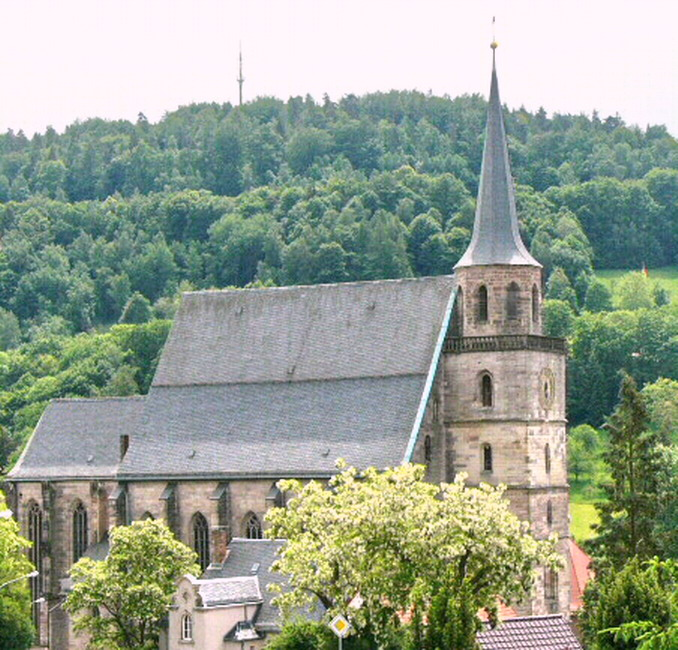
St. Peter's

=== Regular events ===
- Volksfest ("Folk festival") in April on the Festplatz at the Schwedensteg
- The Bavarian Police organize a motorcycle rally to Kulmbach every spring in collaboration with Radio Antenne Bayern. It is the largest motorcycle meeting in southern Germany and the tenth one took place in 2010.
- The Kulmbach Volksfest in May
- The three-day Altstadtfest ("old town festival") in June in wide areas of the town centre (Innenstadt).
- The Blaicher Kerwa in June
- On St. Gregori's Day in July schoolchildren from all of Kulmbach's primary schools assemble in the town square (Rathausplatz) and celebrate the Gregori Festival.
- Since 1939 the Kulmbach Beer Week has been staged at the end of July and beginning of August by the brewery, Kulmbacher Brauerei. The brewery, one of the largest in Germany, was founded in Kulmbach and made it famous for its beer. The town is also known as "The secret capital of beer".
- On Christmas Eve the townsfolk and former townsfolk of Kulmbach meet in the morning for Frühschoppen in the Upper Town (Oberen Stadt). The roads are closed and several thousand visitors go in order to meet friends and relatives whom they have not seen for a long time.

== Transport ==
- Kulmbach station on the Bamberg–Hof railway, with rail connections to Hof, Bamberg, Bayreuth and Lichtenfels. Kulmbach was also the terminus of the former Bayreuth Altstadt–Kulmbach railway.
- Junctions on the B 85 (Berga/Elster–Passau), B 289 (Coburg–Rehau) and six kilometres (3.7 miles) away near Untersteinach B 303 (Schweinfurt–Fichtel Mountains–Schirnding) federal roads, as well as on the A 9 (Munich–Berlin) and A 70 motorways (Bayreuth–Schweinfurt)
- Kulmbach Airfield (506 metres (1,660 feet) above NN) with asphalt runway (3,719 m × 30 m (12,201 ft × 98 ft)) about 3 kilometres (2 miles) north of Kulmbach (306 m (1,004 ft) above NN).

== Economy ==
Kulmbach has traditionally been a manufacturing base for the drinks and food industry. Relatively recently it has become a home to biotechnical pharmaceuticals in the shape of Roche Kulmbach GmbH (previously Alnylam Europe AG), as well as the construction and management of hot water and air conditioning equipment, heat pumps, storage and direct heating equipment, such as that made by Glen Dimplex. "AGO" specialises in biomasse and cogeneration power stations.

== Notable people ==
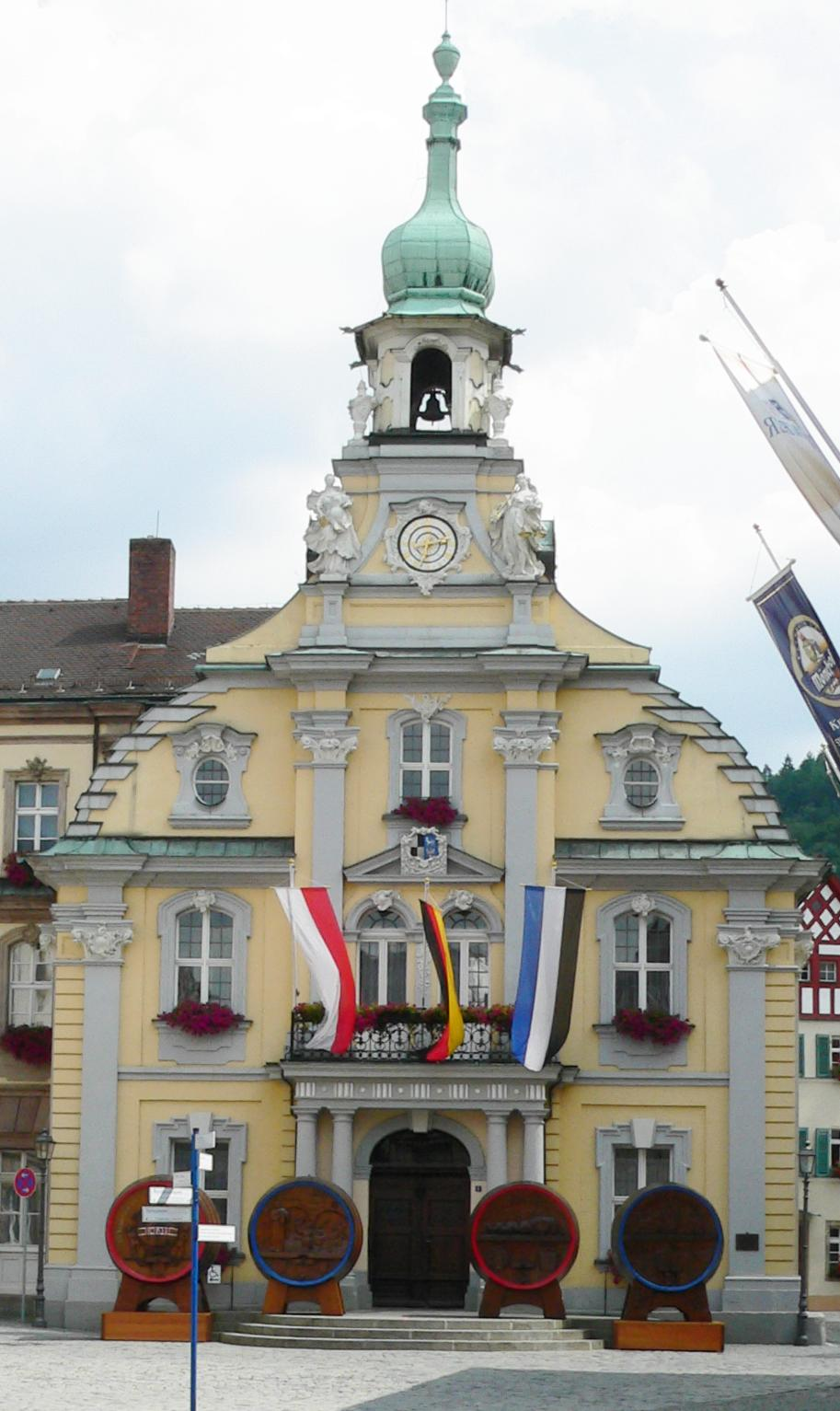
Kulmbach Town Hall with the traditional beer barrels on the occasion of the Beer Festival

- John Charles Meussdorffer I ( 1823–1894), created one of the first hat manufacturing businesses in San Francisco
- Friedrich Sesselmann (c. 1410– 1483), 1445–83 chancellor of the Electorate of Brandenburg, 1455–83 Bishop of Lebus
- Kaspar Preyel (?–1517), 1504–17 auxiliary bishop in Bamberg and titular bishop of Athyra (appointed by Pope Julius II)
- Pankraz Gutteter (1472–1532), long-distance trader
- Hans Suess, also Hans von Kulmbach (c. 1480 – c. 1522), artist and graphic designer of the Albrecht Dürer school
- Ludwig Agricola (c. 1508 – c. 1540), theologian, reformer
- Caspar Vischer (c. 1510–1579), senior builder and engineer for the margrave, George Frederick, during the rebuilding of the Plassenburg; heavily involved in the rebuilding of Kulmbach after its devastation in the Second Margrave War
- Jakob Ellrod (1601–1671), priest, astronomer and mathematician, ancestor of the Reichsfreiherr family of Ellrod
- Sigmund Theophil Staden (1607–1655), organist, composer, wait, artist and poet
- Johann Georg Hoffmann (1705–1778), castle master builder
- Johann Peter Apollonius Weltrich (1781–1850), treasurer, carried out historic and scientific research
- Gottlieb Keim (1783–1868), politician
- Alexander von Hanstein, Count of Pölzig and Beiersdorf (1804–1884), second husband to Louise of Saxe-Gotha, stepfather to Prince Albert
- Johann Adam Ries (1813–1898), coin engraver, punchcutter and graphic designer at the Münzhof in Munich
- Johann Gramp (1819–1903) vigneron and pioneer, Barossa Valley, Australia
- Fritz Huther (1827–1899), artist and Kunsterzieher
- Johann Karl Hetz (1828–1899), artist, professor and teacher in Munich
- Johann Christoph Lauterbach (1832–1918), violin virtuoso, concertmaster, conservatorium teacher, privy councillor in Dresden
- Johannes Kaulfuß (1859–1947), scientist, specialist in mosses and lichens
- Michel Weiß (1867–1951), artist, numerous paintings of Kulmbach and its countryside
- Hans Wilsdorf (1881–1960), businessman, founder of Rolex
- Georg Hagen (1887–1958), politician (SPD)
- Fritz Schuberth (1897–1977), politician (NSDAP) and SS Oberführer
- Nikolaus Wehner (1901–1942), politician (NSDAP)
- Philipp Zeitler (1901–1984), alderman of Würzburg
- Wilhelm Murrmann (1907–1975), lord mayor (FWG)
- Karl Herold (1921–1977), politician (SPD)
- Horst Lohse (born 1943), composer, founder and artistic director of the “Days of New Music” in Bamberg
- Heiner Keupp (born 1943), social psychologist and professor
- Philipp Simon Goletz alias Frankensima (born 27 September 1954), entertainer, author and musician
- Jürgen Teipel (born 1961), journalist and playwright
- Bernd Förtsch (born 1962), founder and owner of the trade magazine Der Aktionär, operator of the Deutschen Anleger Fernsehens DAF
- Alexander Herrmann (born 1971), celebrity and TV chef
- Mirjam Schmidt (born 1977), German politician
- Christopher Haase (born 1987), racing driver

=== Associated to Kulmbach ===
- Nikolaus Hollweg (1897–1923), World War I veteran and Bavarian police officer who was killed by Nazis during the Beer Hall Putsch
- Matthias Tretzscher (1626–1686), organ maker
- Johann Christoph Stierlein (1759–1827), cartographer
- Caspar Walter Rauh (1912–1983), artist and illustrator, lived in Kulmbach from 1955
- Thomas Gottschalk (born 1950), TV presenter
- Karl-Theodor zu Guttenberg (born 1971), former Federal Minister for Defence, represented the district in the Bundestag from 2002 until March 2011

=== Honorary citizens ===
See List of honorary citizens of Kulmbach

=== Margraves of Brandenburg-Kulmbach ===
See Hohenzollern or Brandenburg-Kulmbach

== Sources ==
- Deutscher Städteatlas (1989). Band: IV; 9 Teilband. Acta Collegii Historiae Urbanae Societatis Historicorum Internationalis - Serie C. Im Auftrag des Kuratoriums für vergleichende Städtegeschichte e.V. und mit Unterstützung der Deutschen Forschungsgemeinschaft, hrsg. von Heinz Stoob †, Wilfried Ehbrecht, Jürgen Lafrenz und Peter Johannek. Stadtmappe Kulmbach, Author: Friedrich Bernward Fahlbusch. ISBN 3-89115-039-3, Dortmund-Altenbeken 1989.
- Bogner, Franz X. (2006). Der Obermain. Ein Luftbildporträt von Bayreuth bis Bamberg. Ellwanger-Verlag, Bayreuth, ISBN 3-925361-57-X.
