= Cesenatico Skyscraper =

Skyscraper in Cesenatico, Italy

- Grattacielo di Cesenatico (Italian)
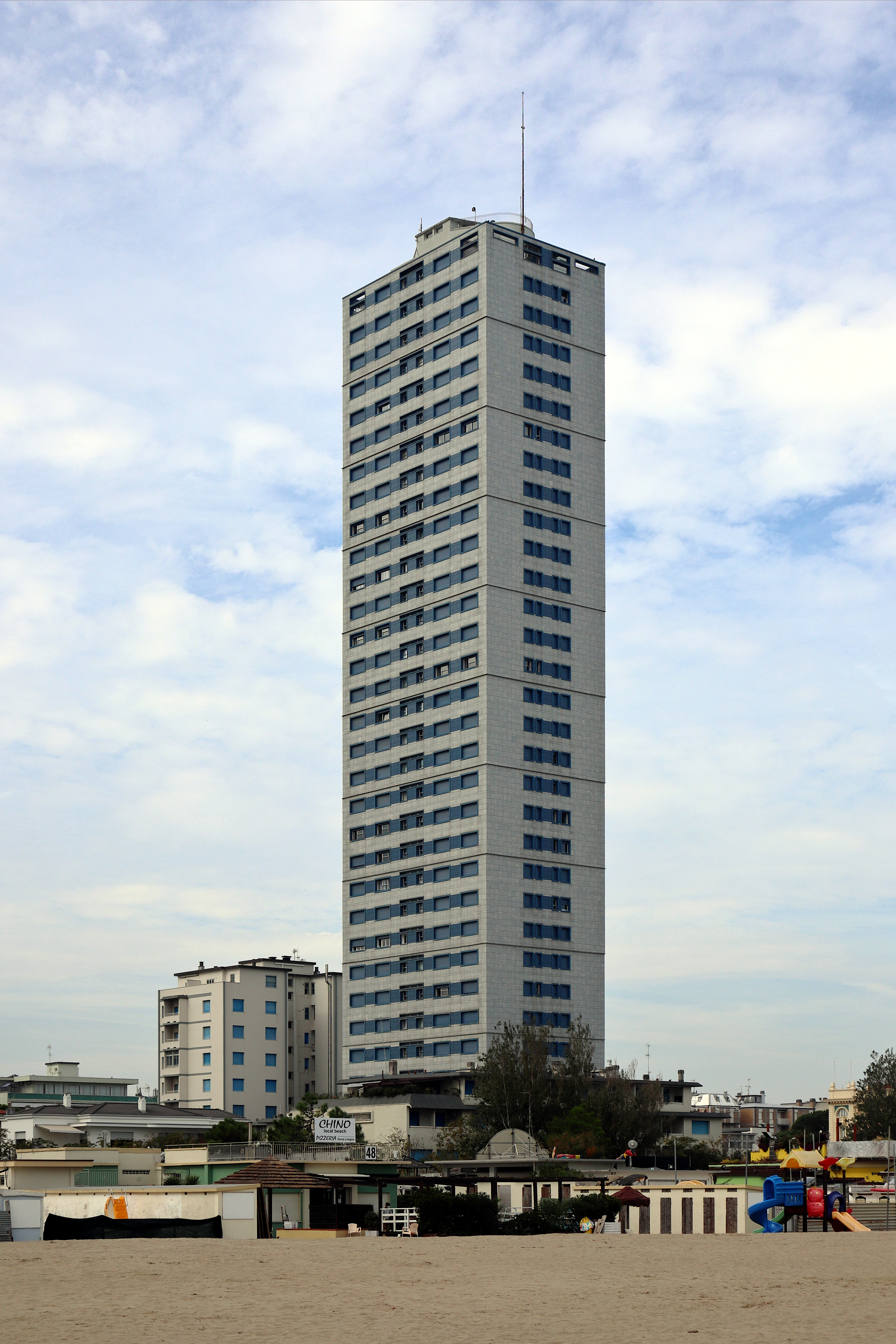
- Interactive map of the Cesenatico Skyscraper area

General information
- Status: Completed
- Type: Residential
- Architectural style: Rationalism
- Location: Cesenatico, Italy, 4 Piazza Andrea Costa, Cesenatico, Italy
- Coordinates: 44.20088°N 12.40632°E
- Construction started: 1957
- Completed: 1958

Height
- Roof: 118 m (387 ft)

Technical details
- Structural system: Concrete
- Floor count: 35

Design and construction
- Architect: Eugenio Berardi
- Structural engineer: Bruno Bottau; Maurizio Berlati & Ivan Missiroli (MEP)

The Cesenatico Skyscraper (Italian: Grattacielo di Cesenatico) is a high-rise residential building in Cesenatico, Italy. Originally built between 1957 and 1958, and recladded in 2009, the tower stands at 118 m (387 ft) tall with 35 floors and was the tallest building in Italy between 1958 and 1960.

== History ==
=== Architecture ===
The tower was designed by the engineer Eugenio Berardi and is also known as Condominio Marinella 2 having been dedicated to his wife Marinella Ragazzini from Faenza. The previous year, again designed by Berardi, the Marinella skyscraper in Milano Marittima had been inaugurated, the fourth skyscraper built in Italy after the Piacentini Tower, the INA Tower and the Breda Tower.

The works were directed by the Marinella Real Estate Company, established by the engineer Berardi and carried out by the Edile Forlivese Cooperative, which completed the project from February 1957 to 5 August 1958. The skyscraper stands on the sand a few dozen metres from the sea.

It is currently the 20th tallest skyscraper in Italy and still one of the tallest reinforced concrete buildings. From topographic and satellite surveys carried out during the study of the renovation works, it emerged that the skyscraper leans 33 centimetres over Piazza Costa.

=== Renovation ===
It has undergone renovation work, which includes: positioning of porcelain stoneware tiles on the facades, insertion of aluminum shutters, revision of hydraulic and electrical systems, replacement of old elevators. These redevelopment works were carried out following the flooding of a floor and the generation of smoke from the elevator machine room.

Between 2003 and 2009 it was subject to complete redevelopment and consolidation works designed by the architect Giovanni Lucchi of Cesenatico and the engineers Maurizio Berlati of Cesenatico and Ivan Missiroli of Forlì.

The works involved:

the load-bearing structure, with the consolidation of 572 of the approximately 900 pillars that support the complex; the drainage plumbing system; the facades, where the 580 roller shutters were replaced and a ventilated facade was applied, made of an aluminum structure and porcelain stoneware tiles in shades of gray measuring 60 x 60 cm, light blue and blue. The contract for the internal and external works of the skyscraper was approximately 4 million Euros.

== See also ==
- List of tallest buildings in Italy

Records
Preceded by Breda Tower	Tallest building in Italy; 1958–1960	Succeeded by Pirelli Tower
