= Bayreuth Altstadt–Kulmbach railway =

Former railway line in Germany

Coordinates: 49°56′07″N 11°33′00″E

Bayreuth Altstadt–Kulmbach
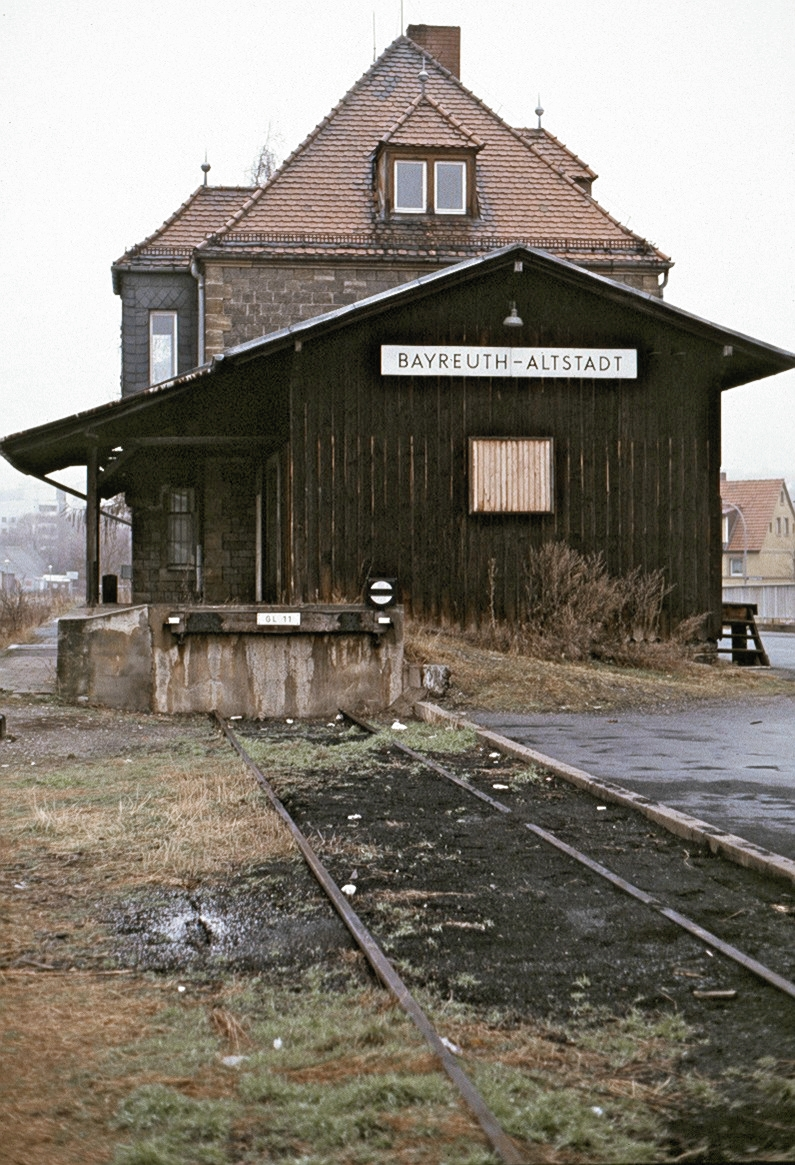
- Bayreuth Altstadt station in 1987

Overview
- Line number: 5003

Service
- Route number: latest 851, 842

Technical
- Line length: 36.9 km (22.9 mi) (Line class: C2)
- Track gauge: 1,435 mm (4 ft 8 1/2 in)
- Maximum incline: 2.55 %

The Bayreuth Altstadt–Kulmbach railway was a branch line in the Bavarian province of Upper Franconia in southern Germany. It was also known colloquially as the Thurnauer Bockela (which roughly translates as "Little Thurnau Goat").

== History ==
=== The first attempt in 1872-1878 ===
On 17 August 1872 the market town of Thurnau applied for the envisaged railway line from Forchheim through Hollfeld to Bayreuth not to be routed to Bayreuth but via Thurnau to Kulmbach, and to extend it via Nordhalben to Eichicht (de) and thus link it with the line to Jena. But after the Forchheim–Plankenfels–Bayreuth railway project went into a concrete planning stage in summer 1877, the towns of Kulmbach and Thurnau modified Thurnau's 1872 proposal in a combined application issued on 18 January 1877. This time it saw the line branching off from a place in the vicinity of Hollfeld from the Forchheim-Bayreuth line and then running via Hollfeld and Thurnau to Kulmbach. The general management of the Royal Bavarian Transport Institution decided on 16 May 1878 to turn these proposals down, however, on operational grounds.

=== The failed second attempt in 1880 ===
After the individual application from the market town of Thurnau, albeit later combined with Kulmbach, foundered, the rural districts under the Royal District Court of Thurnau sent a petition on 13 October 1880 to King Ludwig II of Bavaria requesting the construction of a railway line from Bayreuth via Thurnau and Weismain. This was to form junctions with the Munich–Hof/Saale and Hochstadt/Main–Stockheim–Eichicht railways. The aim was to link Thurnau to the trunk route from Bohemia to Thuringia, that was to run from Eger via Kirchenlaibach and Bayreuth. Ludwig II turned the application down, because the line was not of sufficiently high priority.

=== Third time lucky ===
About 10 years later a Thurnau Lokalbahn (branch line) Committee was formed, that made an application on 14 January 1891 to the State Ministry for the Royal House and Foreign Affairs for a branch from Bayreuth to Thurnau. The Lokalbahn Committee proposed a route through Drossenfeld, Langenstadt, Hutschdorf and Kasendorf. Almost at the same time, the Kulmbach Lokalbahn Committee on 8 March 1891, requested the construction of a Lokalbahn from Kulmbach to Hollfeld, that would be routed via Lanzenreuth, Thurnau, Kasendorf and Wonsees - i.e. through Franconian Switzerland. Since the crown now looked favourably on railway projects, the executive board of the Royal Bavarian Transport Institution, agreed to investigate the construction costs and profitability of both railway proposals. Both routes remained - all in all - in the race. At the instigation of the member of parliament for Kulmbach, Wilhelm Meußdoerffer, the executive board invited the Thurnau and Kulmbach Lokalbahn Committees to a joint discussion at Kasendorf on 20 July 1901. There, the committees were informed that a Lokalbahn from Bayreuth via Thurnau to Kulmbach would be incorporated into the next Lokalbahn law. Both committees immediately agreed. The Imperial (Reichsgraf) Count of Thurnau, von Giech, took over as honorary chairman.

=== Wrangling over the route ===
Nevertheless, there were some changes to the route. At a meeting in Bayreuth on 2 September 1903, to which the Royal Bavarian State Railways had invited interested parties, the course of the railway was finally fixed. The most important changes were:

- Melkendorf succeeded in getting the Lokalbahn routed via Melkendorf and not Burghaig.
- Count von Giech got agreement for a halt at Krumme Fohre, which gave his chalk sandstone (Kalksandstein) factory access to the railway network. The count donated 43,000 m² of land to facilitate this.

=== Construction ===
After the Lokalbahn law of 10 August 1904 had authorised the construction of the line, along with 29 other branch lines, the first sod was cut on the Thurnau–Kulmbach section on 1 May 1907 and on the Bayreuth–Thurnau section on 1 February 1908.

The Thurnau–Kulmbach stretch was opened on 11 October 1908, and the Bayreuth–Thurnau section on 26 June 1909. The line was opened to the public on 28 June 1909.

== Route ==
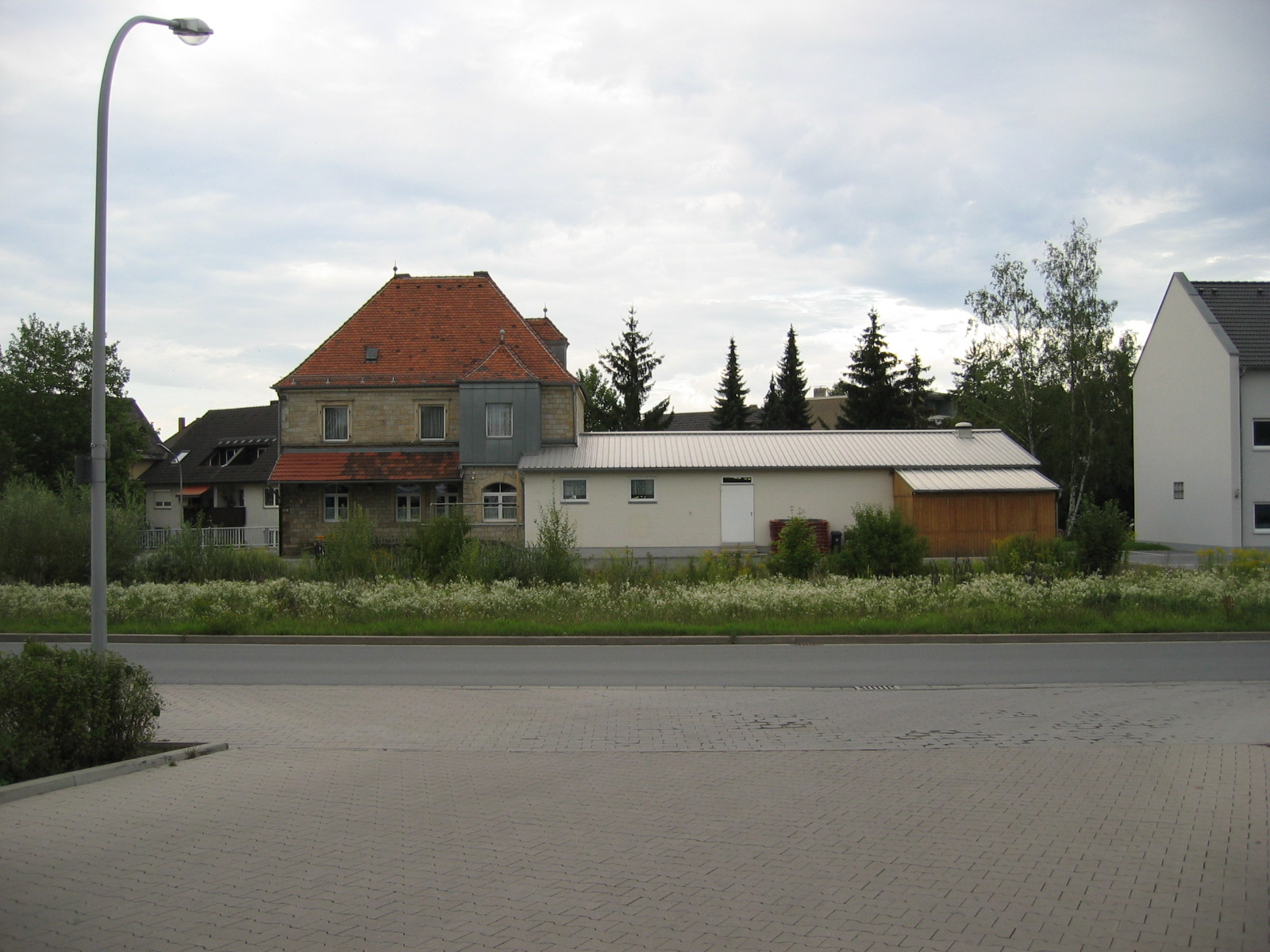
Bayreuth-Altstadt station from the south

(The coordinates in the text are for Google Earth and can be entered using cut and paste. The Drossenfeld–Kulmbach section is still shown as existing in Google Earth.)

The line branched off at Bayreuth Altstadt station (49°56'7.06"N 11°33'0.23"E) from the Lokalbahn to Hollfeld in a westerly direction. Running through Heinersreuth and Altenplos the line reached Neudrossenfeld. Beyond Neuenreuth am Main it descended through the Limmersdorf Forest and ran downhill to Thurnau, the former midpoint of the line. After passing through Krumme Fohre, Katschenreuth and Melkendorf the line finally reached Kulmbach.

- Steepest incline: near Limmersdorf 25.0 ‰
- Journey time: Bayreuth Hauptbahnhof–Bayreuth Altstadt–Thurnau: 72 minutes

=== Structures ===
Three of the larger structures are worth mentioning:

- Kalkbruchstein bridge over the Mistelbach near Bayreuth Altstadt; inside span: 18 m
- The Schorrmühl bridge over the Aubach near the mill (Schorrmühle) at Thurnau; a two arch concrete bridge - since torn down (2004?); inside span of each arch: 16 m
- Bridge over the Red Main near Katschenreuth; Steel bar design; inside span: 25 m; there are also two smaller 'flood bridges'

=== Private sidings ===
Siding	Kilometre marker	Remarks
Forest siding (Forstgleis)	17.5	1908–1910; special track for transporting away the trees damaged by the Black Arches moth in Limmersdorf Forest
Steinenhausen	37,6	
Bayernwerk	39,2	Pre-1960 facility

== Closure ==
Passenger service were closed on the Bayreuth–Neudrossenfeld section on 3 June 1973; and goods traffic followed on 1 January 1983. The tracks were completely dismantled by 7 December 1983, and the track system in Thurnau station considerably scaled down. The station building at Thurnau and its associated goods shed were demolished in December 1985, the station building in Drossenfeld met the same fate in 1987.

The two single-arched stone bridges in the city of Bayreuth (over Bamberger Straße (49°56'12.08"N 11°32'49.65"E) directly northwest of Bayreuth-Altstadt station and over Adlerstraße (49°56'20.39"N 11°32'47.87"E)) were demolished by the mid-1970s. The railway embankment was turned into a city cycle route and is partly used as an access path to the houses in Lotzbeckstraße built in the 1980s. The city street map shows the former railway as Thurnauer Weg.

On 3 September 1993 the last section of line, from Kulmbach to Thurnau, was closed for passenger services; the section from Thurnau to Neudrossenfeld having close several years earlier (ca. 1983), not least because of the construction of the bypass around Neudrossenfeld, the B 85. Goods trains still ran to Melkendorf until 31 December 1998; since then only the siding has been served. The only tracks that remain run from Kulmbach station to the level crossing in Melkendorf (May 2007).

== Present-day use of the trackbed ==
The former trackbed from Bayreuth-Oberobsang (the crossroads of the B 85 with Himmelkronstraße) to Heinersreuth (end of Bayreuther Straße shortly before entering the town) was removed in the 1970s to enable the upgrade of the B 85. Today, Drossenfelder Weg and Drossenfelder Straße are on the former base of the old B 85. The level crossing at the end of the present-day Bayreuther Straße was very dangerous because the road ran uphill and cut the trackbed at a very sharp bend.

Much of the rest of the line from Bayreuth to Kulmbach has been converted into the Red Main Cycle Way (Rotmain-Radweg) .

== Nickname ==
Robert Zintl reported that a Lokalbahn line was affectionately called the Bockela or Bockl because most of the trains on these lines "now and then bucked and kicked somewhat obstinately like a stroppy little billy goat" (hie und da etwas eigenwillig bockte und stieß wie ein gereiztes Böcklein).

== See also ==
- Royal Bavarian State Railways
- Bavarian branch lines
- List of closed railway lines in Bavaria
