= Gottlieb Keim =

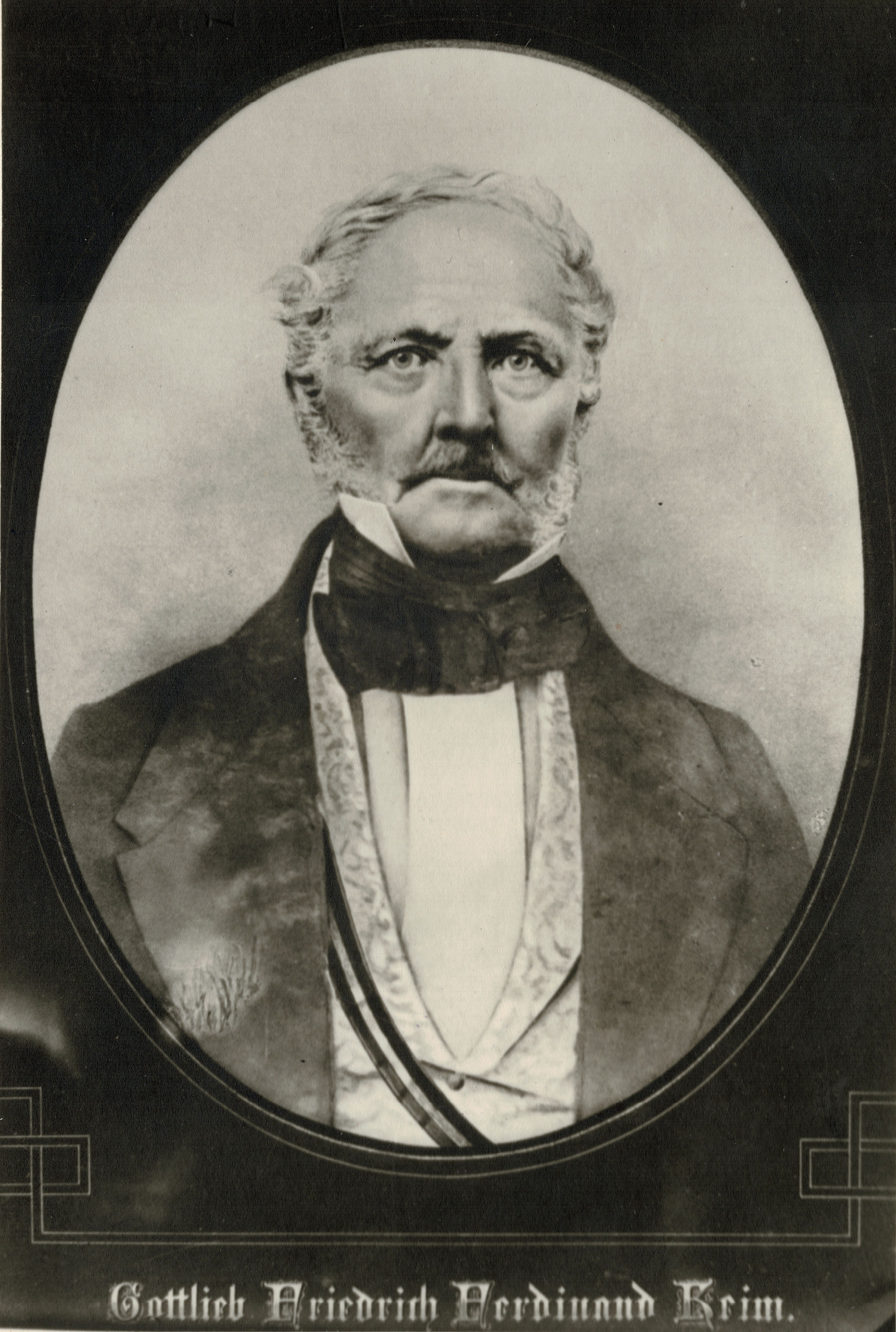
Gottlieb Keim

Gottlieb Keim (10 March 1783 – 29 August 1868) was a member of the Frankfurt Parliament.

== Life ==
Born in Kulmbach, during his law studies at the University of Erlangen-Nuremberg Keim became a member of the Corps Onoldia, from which he left because of differences. With like-minded fellow students from the Bayreuth area he thereupon founded in 1803 a Landsmannschaft for Bayreuth students, which took the place of a Franconian Landsmannschaft in dissolution and developed bit by bit to the Corps Baruthia.

Hired against Napoleon Bonaparte, he entered the Prussian judicial service after his studies. After Franconia had been occupied and handed over to Bavaria, he refused to join the Bavarian civil service (Bavaria was on the side of the opponent).

Subsequently, he became a freelance lawyer and city councillor in Bayreuth. The city sent him in 1848 as a member of the Frankfurt Parliament.

Keim died in Bayreuth August 29, 1868, at the age of 85.

== Literature ==
- Dieter Mronz: Gottlieb Friedr. Ferd. Keim 1783–1868. Jahrbuch des Verein für corpsstudentische Geschichtsforschung, vol. 31 (1986), pp. 159–176
- Egbert Weiß: Corpsstudenten in der Paulskirche, Einst und Jetzt, special issue 1990, p. 25
