= Mirjam Schmidt =

German politician

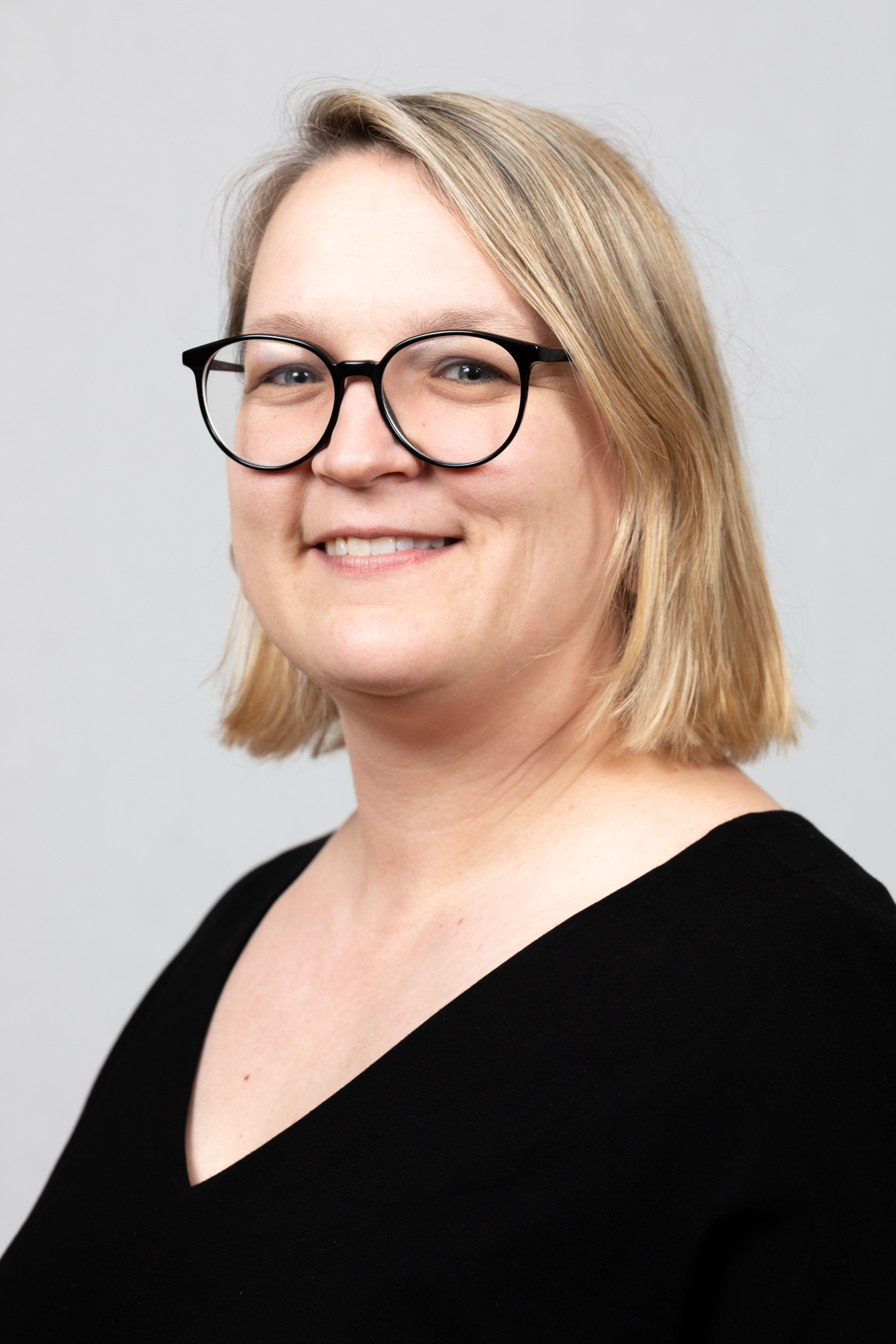
- Schmidt in 2019

Members of the Landtag of Hesse
- Incumbent
- Assumed office January 2019

Personal details
- Born: Mirjam Schmidt; 1977 (age 48–49) Kulmbach, Germany
- Party: Alliance 90/The Greens

Mirjam Luise Schmidt (born 26 February 1977 in Kulmbach) is a German politician (Alliance 90/The Greens) and since 2019 member of the Landtag of Hesse.

== Life ==
Mirjam Schmidt studied art history, history and pedagogy in Munich (1998-2004) and Frankfurt am Main (2004-2007) and graduated with a master's degree. After working as an assistant and gallery director at the Voges Gallery in Frankfurt am Main, she joined Meixner Schlüter Wendt Architekten in 2010 as a management assistant, where she was also responsible for press and public relations. From 2013 to 2018, Mirjam Schmidt was personal assistant to Christoph Mäckler and head of communications at the German Institute of Urban Design in Frankfurt am Main. Most recently, she worked as a consultant for the City of Frankfurt am Main, where she is responsible for Department III Human Resources and Health.

She has been a member of Alliance 90/The Greens since 2016. In the 2018 Hessian state election, she became a member of the Hesse state parliament. She ran in the electoral district Frankfurt am Main IV and achieved a result of 10,647 votes (25.7%) there. She entered the state parliament via her party's state list.

== Publications ==
- Mirjam Luise Schmidt: Liturgische Elfenbeinkämme von 800-1200. Eine Analyse von Stil, Form, Darstellungsinhalt und historischer Überlieferung. VDM Verlag Dr. Müller, Saarbrücken 2010, ISBN 978-3-639-27710-4 (Magisterarbeit).
