= Rosetta Berardi =

Italian painter and artist (born 1944)

- Born: 17 May 1944 (age 82); San Michele di Ganzaria, Sicily, Kingdom of Italy
- Education: University of Bologna
- Occupations: Painter, stylist and publicist
- Spouses: Eugenio Berardi (m. 1976, d. 1977) Ivano Simonini (m. 1984)
- Children: 1
- Parent(s): Gaetano Lavatura, Salvatrice Mesarrocchio

Rosetta Berardi (née Lavatura; born 17 May 1944) is an Italian painter, photographer and installation artist. Born in San Michele di Ganzaria, Sicily, she has lived and worked in Ravenna since the 1960s.

== Biography ==
Rosetta Lavatura was born on 17 May 1944 in San Michele di Ganzaria, in the province of Catania, Sicily, the youngest daughter of Gaetano Lavatura and Salvatrice Mesarrocchio. In 1962, she moved with her family from Sicily to Ravenna. There, she studied painting at the Academy of Fine Arts of Ravenna and later graduated in Contemporary art history from the University of Bologna. Berardi began her artistic career in the late 1970s, initially working in figurative painting. Her practice subsequently expanded to include installation art and photography. Her work has also incorporated elements inspired by different writing systems and cultures, influenced in part by her travels in India and China. Since the 1990s, photography has become an important part of Berardi’s artistic practice. Her photographic works have frequently focused on details of the human body, including hands, feet and faces. Since 1977, she has used the name Berardi when signing her works, in memory of her first husband, the architect Eugenio Berardi. In 1984 she married Ivano Simonini, a publisher.

== Exhibitions ==
Berardi has participated in numerous exhibitions in Italy and abroad. Her exhibition history includes the Biennale of Sculpture in Gubbio in 1994, Premio Vasto in 1995, the 12th Rome Quadriennale in 1996, the International Triennale of Sacred Art in Celano in 1997 and Premio Michetti in 1997. In 2007, Berardi was invited to exhibit at the UNESCO headquarters in Paris for International Women's Day, where she presented her solo exhibition Chindiart. Her works are held in public and private collections, including the Museo d'Arte della città di Ravenna (MAR), the Museo della Grafica in Bagnacavallo, the Galleria Comunale d'Arte Moderna in Spoleto, and other contemporary art collections in Italy and abroad.

== Biblioteca Minima ==
Berardi has collaborated with poets on Biblioteca Minima, an artist's book series published by Edizioni del Girasole in Ravenna. The project combines her original graphics with poetry by writers including Mary de Rachewiltz, Mario Lunetta, Nanni Menetti, Sylvano Bussotti, Paolo Ruffilli, Ennio Cavalli, Maram al-Masri and Nevio Spadoni.

== Later work ==
Berardi continued to work across painting, photography and installation throughout the 21st century. In 2024, the Comune di Ravenna presented Rosetta Berardi. Iconografie del dolore privato at Palazzo Rasponi dalle Teste. The exhibition brought together works from different periods of her career and explored themes including pain, memory and the human condition. In 2024, Berardi also published Un paese nell'anima, a book inspired by her childhood in San Michele di Ganzaria. In 2025, her exhibition Tra i veli e gli strappi was held at the Museo della Città Spazio Presente in Ancona. The exhibition brought together installations, paintings and photographs addressing violence against women.
