= Nikolaus Hollweg =

German police officer (1897–1923)

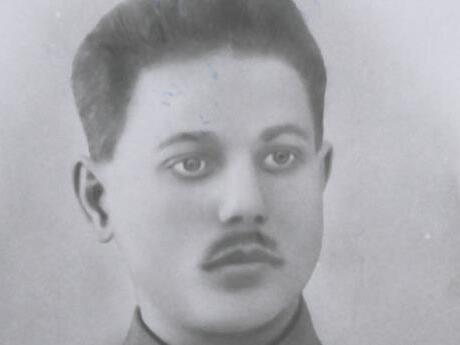
- Undated photo of Hollweg
- Born: 15 May 1897; Kulmbach, Kingdom of Bavaria
- Died: 9 November 1923 (aged 26) Munich, Weimar Republic
- Cause of death: Gunshot wounds
- Allegiance: German Empire; Weimar Republic
- Branch: Imperial German Navy; Bavarian Police
- Service years: 1917–1919
- Rank: Petty officer
- Known for: One of four casualties during the Beer Hall Putsch
- Conflicts: World War I; Political violence in Germany (1918–1933) †
- Memorials: Odeonsplatz, Munich

Nikolaus Hollweg (15 May 1897 – 9 November 1923) was a Bavarian police officer and wachtmeister who was a member of the Bavarian Police Hundertschaft, and one of the four government casualties during the Beer Hall Putsch, in which Adolf Hitler and the Nazis first attempted to seize power and overthrow the Weimar Republic.

== Biography and context ==
Born in 1897 in a small village (ortsteil) of Kulmbach, Hollweg first worked as a merchant. In 1917, he was recruited by the Imperial German Navy and fought in World War I as part of the crew of German U-boats, remaining in the Navy until his discharge in 1919 as a petty officer. After his military service, Hollweg enlisted in the Bavarian Police in November 1922, signing up for 12 years of service and working in Munich as a first assignment.

Inspired by the rise of Benito Mussolini and fascism in Italy, Hitler thought that he could gain public sympathy from general discontent with high inflation in the Weimar Republic as well as capitalise on other continuing discontents like the effects of losing World War I.

On 8 November 1923, Adolf Hitler and his followers of the Nazi Party launched the Beer Hall Putsch, seeking to overthrow the Weimar Republic. As the coup attempt threatened to fail, Hitler tried to convince the population to join his side and support the putsch by marching on Munich on 9 November. The march began at the Bürgerbräukeller, heading for the Military District Command, formerly the Royal Bavarian Ministry of War. Nazi member Ernst Röhm and his followers had been mutinying there since the previous day, prompting the 2nd Police Company to attempt to halt the march and prevent its advance on the Military District Command. During the ensuing confrontation, the putschists opened fire on the police, who returned fire. Hollweg and three other police officers were fatally wounded in the exchange of fire with the Nazis, who suffered about 16 casualties by Bavarian police. The putschists were finally suppressed, and Hitler's attempts were thwarted, resulting in his imprisonment.

== Legacy ==
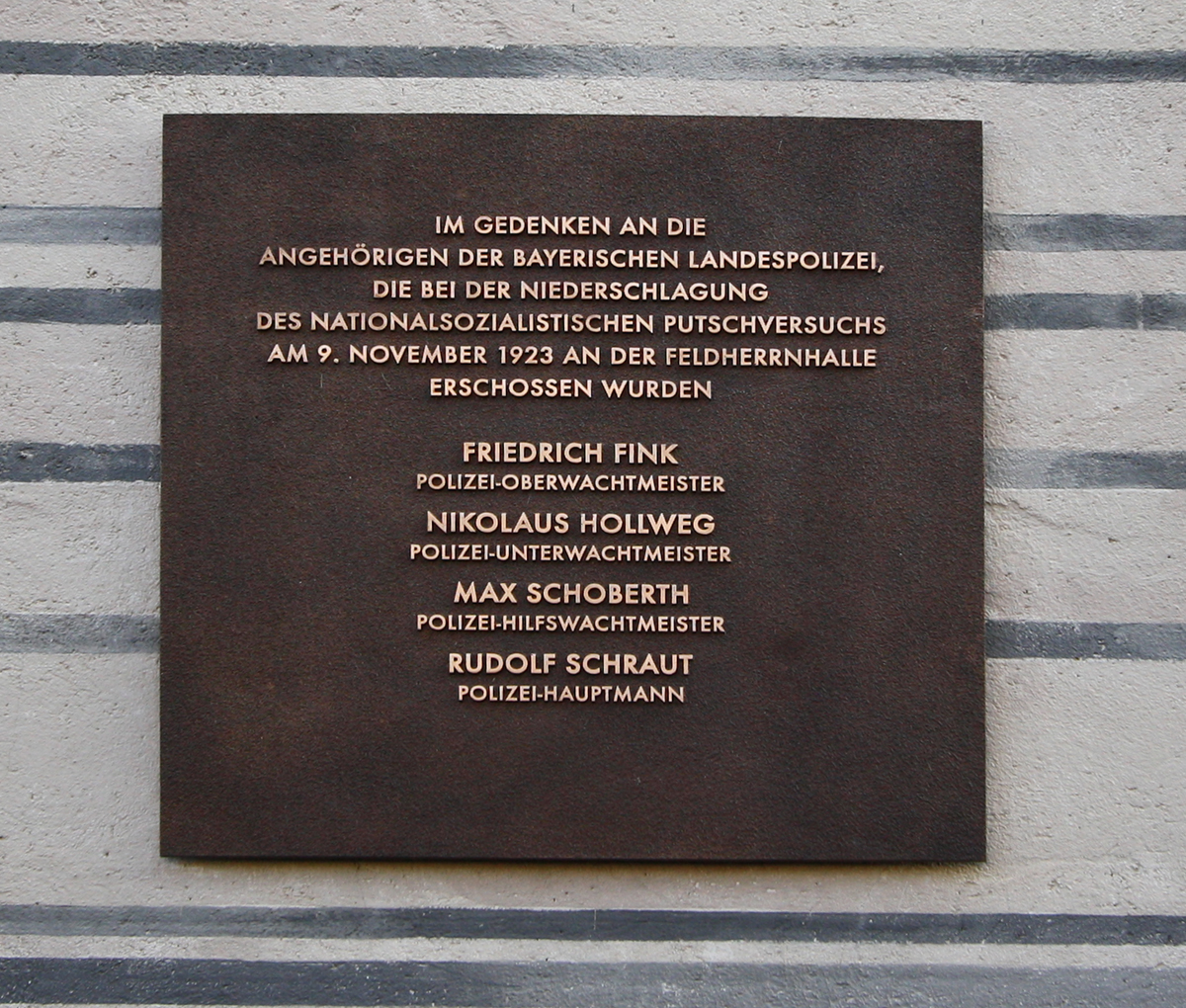
Memorial at Munich Residenz

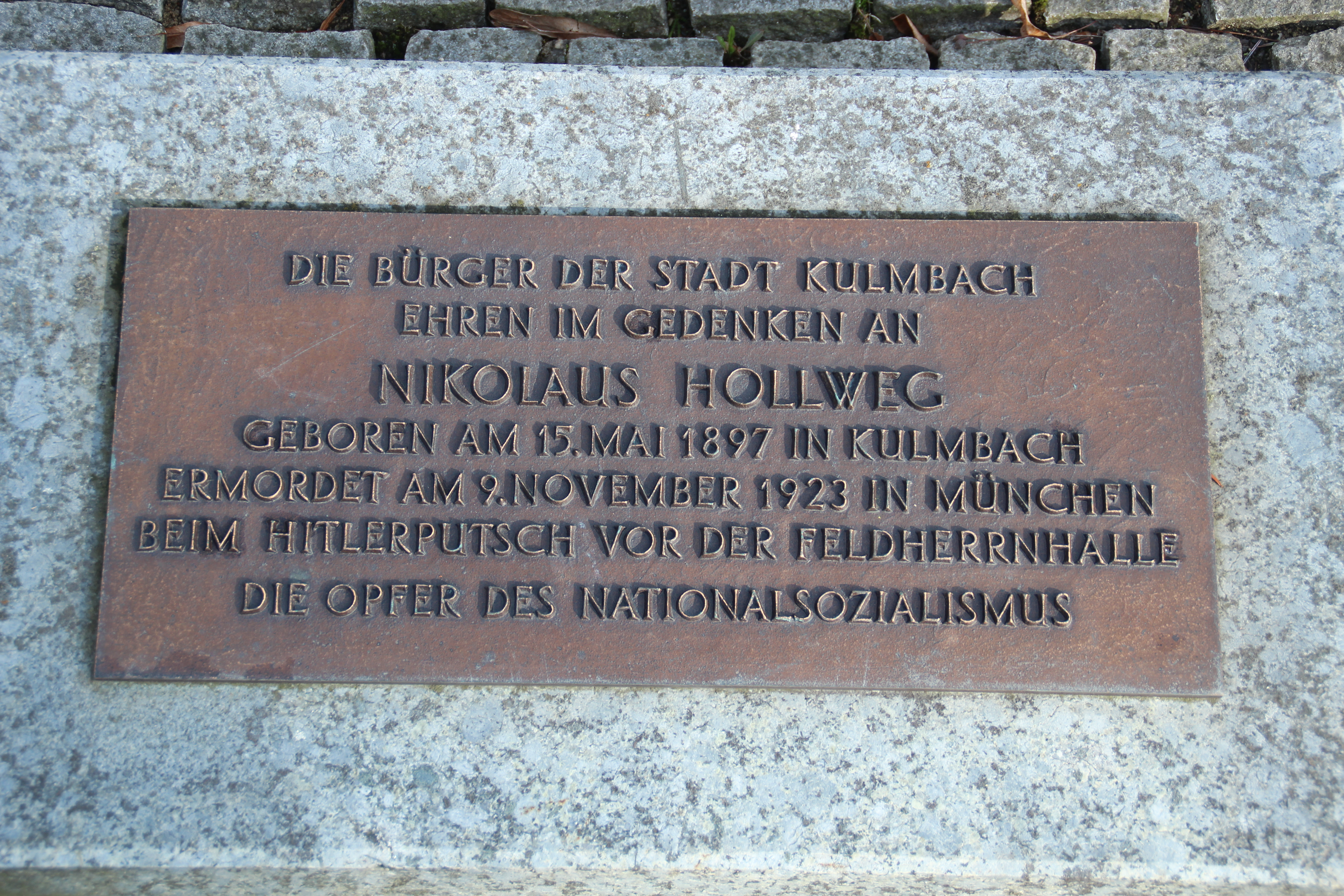
Memorial in Kulmbach

After Hitler's rise to power in 1933 and the 1934 purge during the Night of the Long Knives, Hitler directed the SS to avenge the failure of the coup, including the extrajudicial execution of Bavarian officer Gustav Ritter von Kahr, who was tortured and murdered at Dachau concentration camp in June 1934 on the orders of camp's commandant, Theodor Eicke. Von Kahr was 71 years old. Participants in the putsch were awarded the Blood Order award by the Nazi regime.

In 1994, the city of Munich erected a memorial plaque at Odeonsplatz, commemorating Hollweg and his three comrades from the Bavarian State Police who were killed in the putsch. The plaque was later removed and replaced in 2010 by a memorial plaque on the facade of the Munich Residenz. Another memorial plaque in honor of Hollweg is located in his birthplace in Kulmbach. Hollweg, as well as the other three officers, are considered by modern German politicians and media as martyrs and defenders of the Weimar democracy as well as one of the first rejections of Nazism by Germans.
