= Eugenio Berardi =

Italian architect (1921–1977)

- Born: Eugenio Berardi; 8 June 1921; Lugo, Emilia-Romagna, Kingdom of Italy
- Died: 15 July 1977 (aged 56); Ravenna, Italy
- Education: University of Bologna
- Occupation: Architect
- Spouses: Marinella Ragazzini (m. 1954, ?) Rosetta Lavatura (m. 1976)
- Children: 2
- Buildings: Cesenatico Skyscraper, Milano Marittima Skyscraper, Grand Hotel Adriano, Lido Adriano

Eugenio Berardi (8 June 1921 – 15 July 1977) was an Italian architect and engineer, known for being the architect of the Cesenatico Skyscraper, tallest building in Italy from 1958 to 1960.

== Early life and education ==
Eugenio Berardi was born on 8 June 1921 in Bizzuno, frazione of the comune of Lugo, in Emilia-Romagna, Italy. He was the son of Olivolo Berardi and Elisabetta Mazzenti.

After fighting in World War II, in 1949 he graduated from the University of Bologna, with a degree in engineering. In 1954, after his marriage with Marinella Ragazzini, Berardi opened a studio in Lugo, before moving to Faenza in 1958.

== Career ==
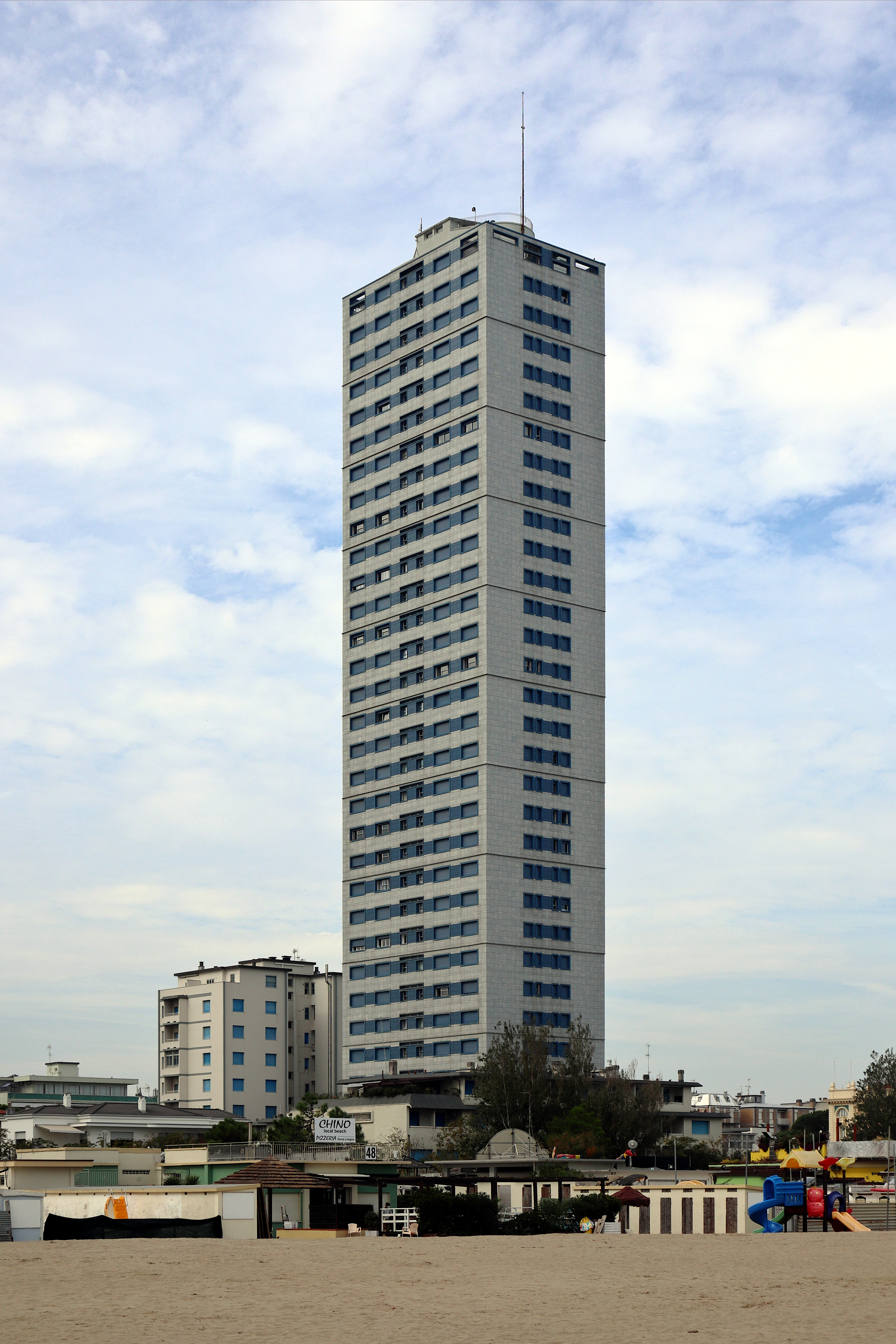
The Cesenatico skyscraper in 2022

In 1956, he founded the Società Immobiliare Marinella, with the objective of constructing several skyscrapers by the sea. Just a year later, in 1957, they were able to construct a skyscraper in Milano Marittima, followed by another in Cesenatico. The Cesenatico Skyscraper was the tallest in Italy from 1958 to 1960, measuring over 118 meters tall.

== Personal life ==
Berardi was married to Marinella Ragazzini, and had two daughters; Rosella and Genny. In 1976 he wed Rosetta Lavatura, a painter of Sicilian origins.

He died in Ravenna on 15 July 1976.
