= Pratella (surname) =

Pratella is an Italian surname. Notable people with the surname include:

- Attilio Pratella (1856–1949), Italian painter
- Francesco Balilla Pratella (1880–1955), Italian composer, musicologist, and essayist

== See also ==
- Pratella
