= Neudrossenfeld =

- Municipality
- Coat of arms

- Location of Neudrossenfeld within Kulmbach district
- Interactive map of Neudrossenfeld
- Location within Germany Location within Bavaria
- Coordinates: 50°1′N 11°30′E
- Country: Germany
- State: Bavaria
- Admin. region: Oberfranken
- District: Kulmbach
- Subdivisions: 45 Ortsteile

Government
  - Mayor (2020–26): Harald Hübner (CSU)

Area
  - Total: 50.24 km^{2} (19.40 sq mi)
- Elevation: 334 m (1,096 ft)

Population (2025-12-31)
  - Total: 3,738
  - Density: 74.40/km^{2} (192.7/sq mi)
- Time zone: UTC+01:00 (CET)
  - Summer (DST): UTC+02:00 (CEST)
- Postal codes: 95512
- Dialling codes: 09203
- Vehicle registration: KU
- Website: www.neudrossenfeld.de

Neudrossenfeld is a municipality in the district of Kulmbach in Upper Franconia in Bavaria, Germany.

== Boroughs ==
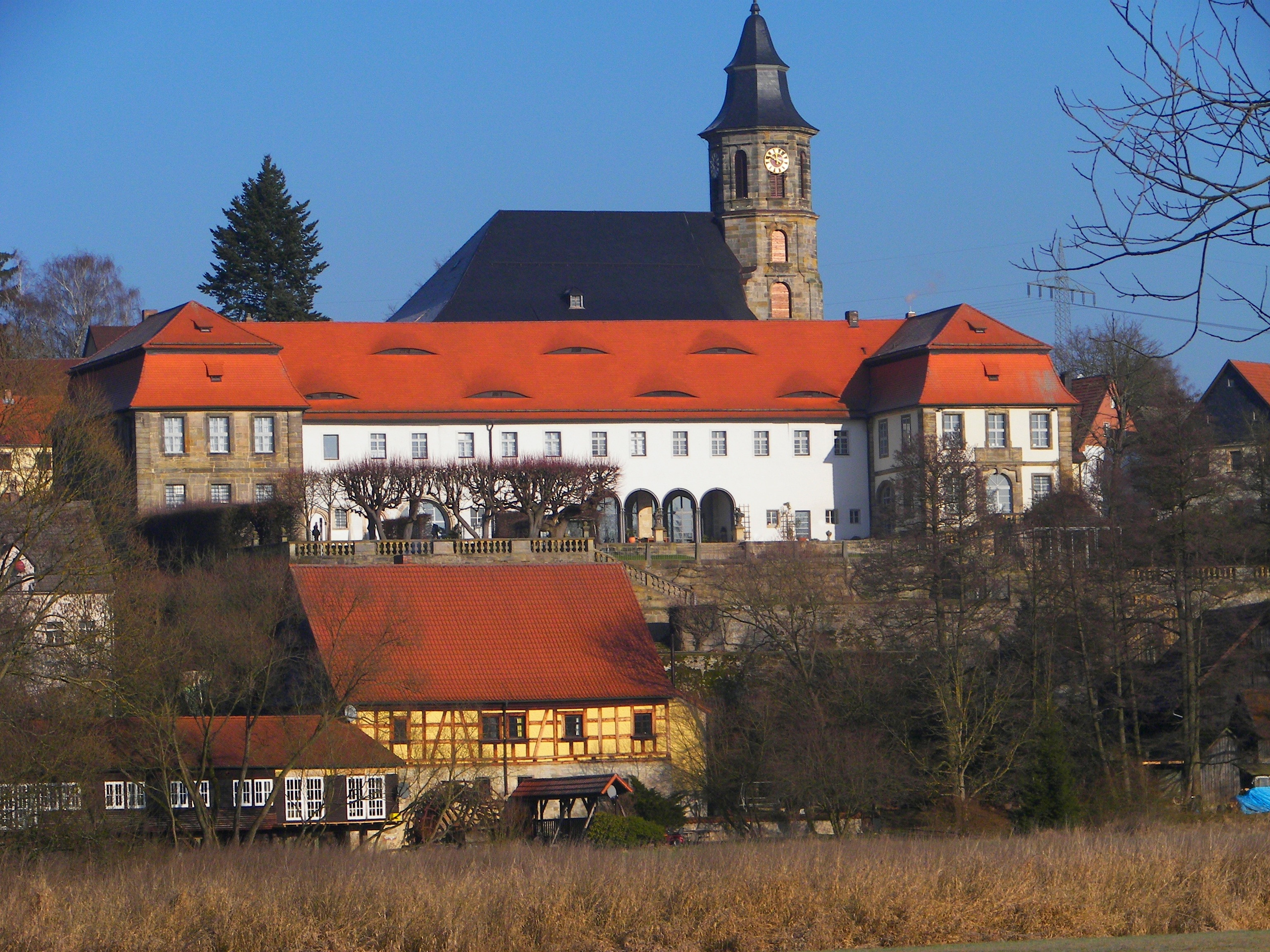
Church, castle and mill

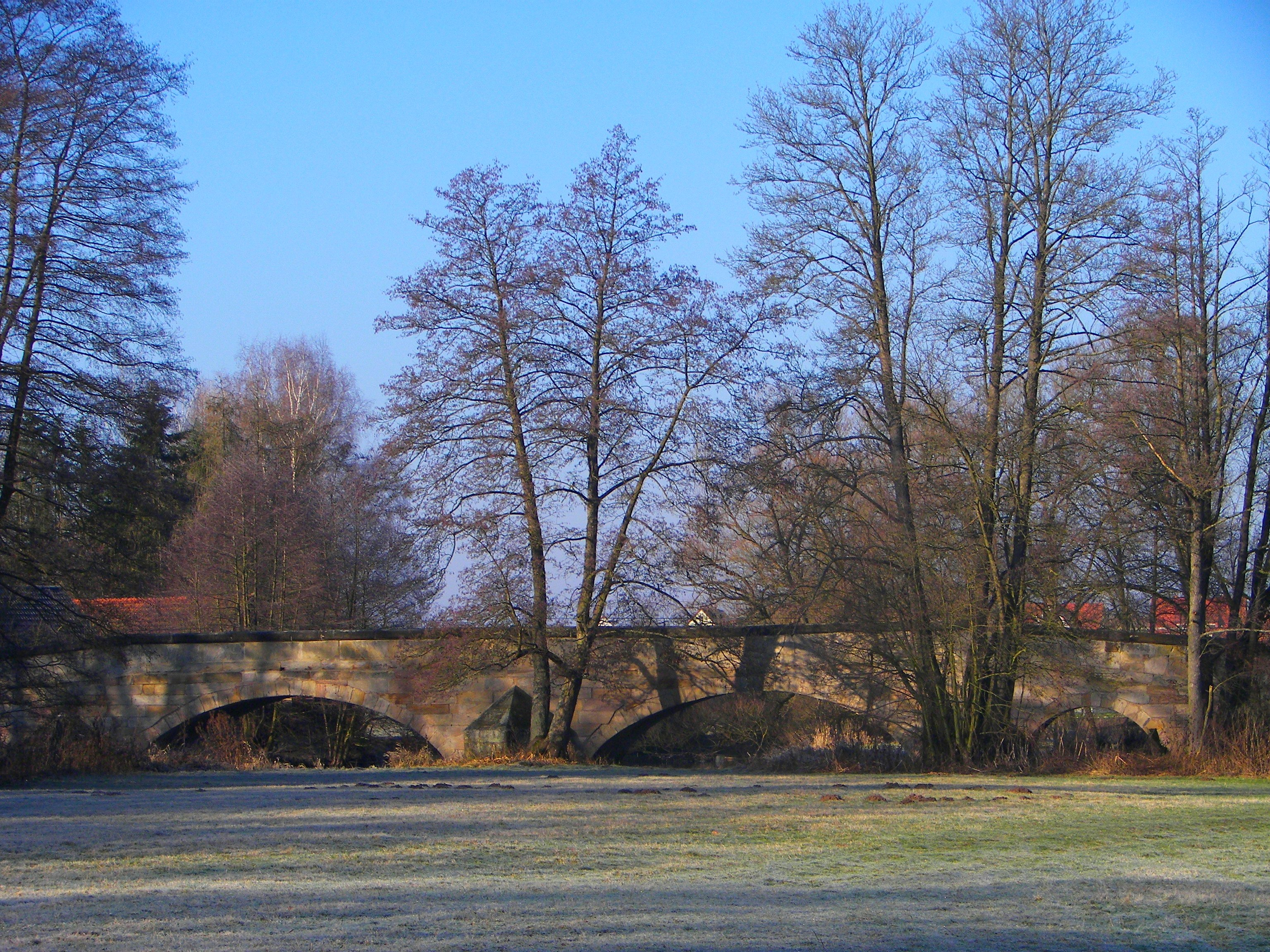
Old bridge over Roter Main river

Neudrossenfeld is composed of the following boroughs:

- Aichen
- Altdrossenfeld
- Berghaus
- Brücklein
- Buch
- Dreschen
- Dreschenau
- Eberhardtsreuth
- Eichberg
- Eselslohe
- Fichtelhof
- Fohlenhof
- Grauenthal
- Hainbühl
- Heidelmühle
- Hirschgründlein
- Hörethshof
- Hornungsreuth
- Igelsreuth
- Langenstadt
- Lehen
- Mermettenreuth
- Muckenreuth
- Neudrossenfeld
- Neuenreuth
- Oberbrücklein
- Oberkeil
- Oberzinkenflur
- Pechgraben
- Rohr
- Rudolphsberg
- Schaitz
- Schlappach
- Schwingen
- Tauberhof
- Unterbrücklein
- Untergräfenthal
- Unterkeil
- Unterlaitsch
- Unterlettenrangen
- Unterobsang
- Unterzinkenflur
- Waldau
- Waldmannsberg
- Wehelitz
- Zoltmühle

== Sport ==
The towns association football club TSV Neudrossenfeld, formed in 1924, celebrated its greatest success in 2014 when it won promotion to the northern division of the Bayernliga for the first time.
