= Bavarian Police =

State police of Bavaria, Germany

Bavarian Police Bayerische Polizei
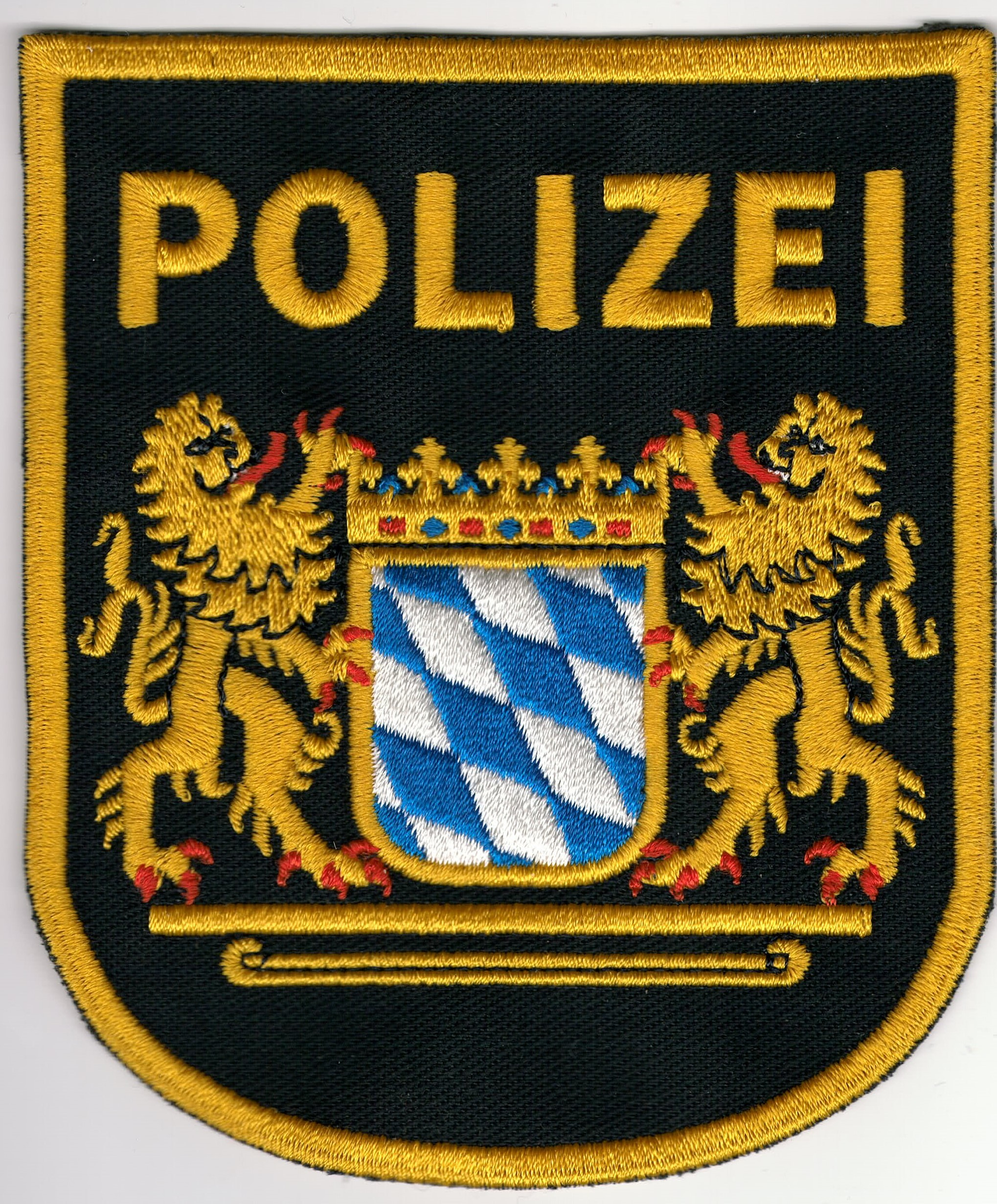
- Uniform patch

- Police badge

Agency overview
- Formed: 29 June 1946
- Employees: 41,400 (2019)
- Annual budget: €4.789 billion (2025)

Jurisdictional structure
- Operations jurisdiction: Bavaria (Germany)
- Area: 70,550.19 km^{2}
- Population: 13,003,252 (2018)
- General nature: Local civilian police

Operational structure
- Overseen by: Bavarian Ministry of the Interior
- Headquarters: Munich, Bavaria, Germany
- Agency executive: Michael Schwald, Landespolizeipräsident

Website
- www.polizei.bayern.de

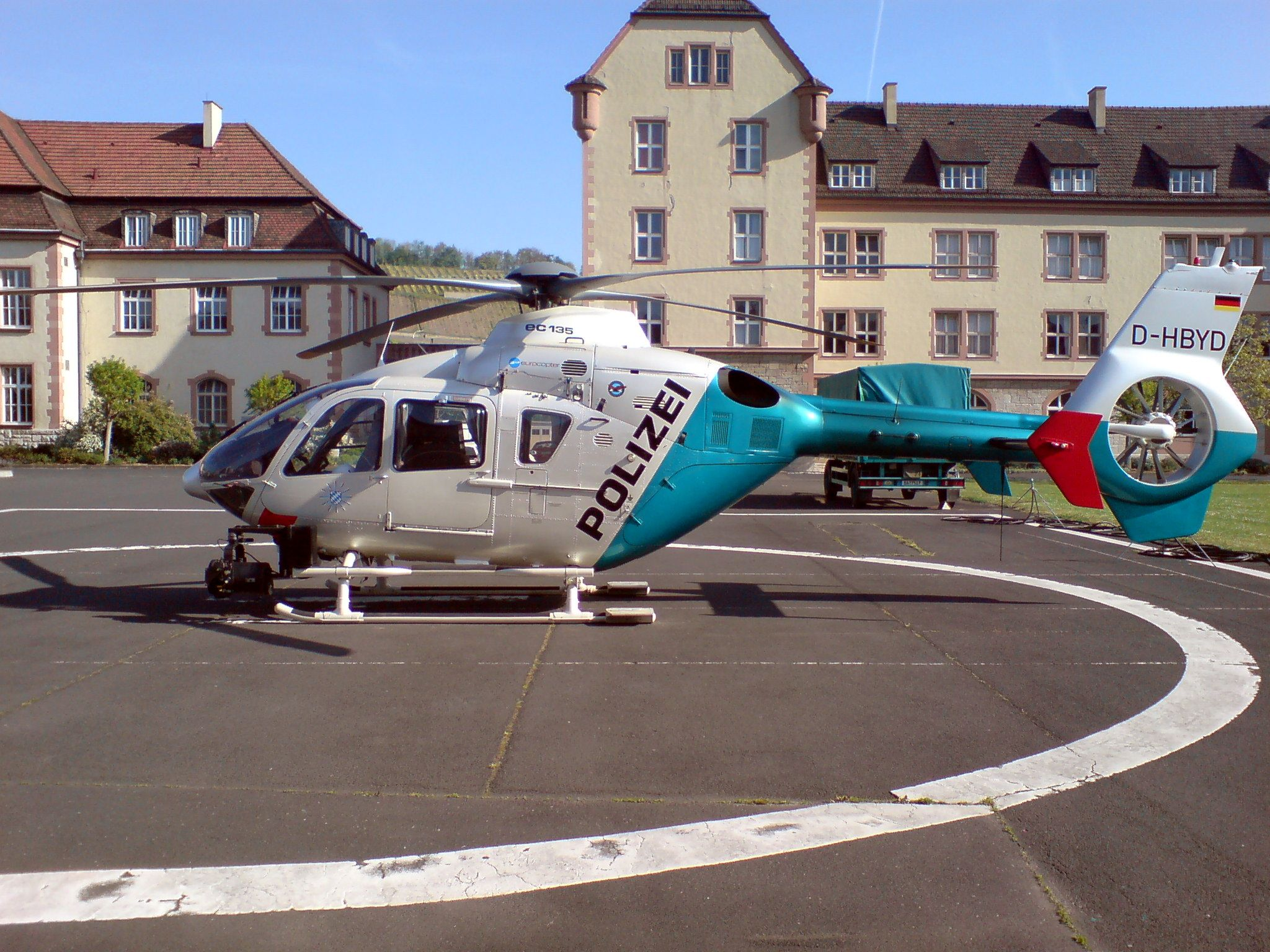
A Eurocopter EC-135 police helicopter of the Bavarian State Police

The Bavarian Police (German: Bayerische Polizei) is the state police force of the German state of Bavaria under the umbrella of the Bavarian Ministry of the Interior. It has approximately 33,500 armed officers and roughly 8,500 other civilian employees.

== Organization ==
The 10 regional police authorities in Bavaria are:

- Munich (Polizeipräsidium München)
- Central Franconia: Nuremberg
- Lower Franconia: Würzburg
- Upper Franconia: Bayreuth
- Upper Palatinate: Regensburg
- Lower Bavaria: Straubing
- Upper Bavaria-South: Rosenheim
- Upper Bavaria-North: Ingolstadt
- Swabia-North: Augsburg
- Swabia-South: Kempten

Bavaria reorganised hierarchy structures between 2005 and 2008 to reduce bureaucracy, changing from a four-tier hierarchy (Interior Ministry– Regional administration – Police Department – Police Station) to three levels (Interior Ministry, Regional Police Authority, Police Station). The seven Polizeipräsidien in Würzburg, Bayreuth, Regensburg, Nuremberg, Augsburg, Munich and Oberbayern (HQ in Munich) gave way to the 10 new areas and the Polizeidirektionen disappeared.

The reorganisation required the rewiring of all police radio and emergency notification networks which are not located only at each regional police authority.

In 2021 the official name was changed from Bayerische Staatliche Polizei (Bavarian State Police) to Bayerische Polizei (Bavarian Police).

== State Police Units ==
=== Bavarian Border Police ===
Due to the European migrant crisis in 2015, the Bavarian State Government re-established the Bavarian Border Police in 2018 to support the Federal Police to protect the border to Austria, to the Czech Republic and at the Nuremberg Airport.

=== Bereitschaftspolizei ===
The Police Support Group HQ (Bereitschaftspolizeipräsidium) in Bamberg employs 6,000 officers and civilian staff at seven Bereitschaftspolizeiabteilungen (BPA), the police schools, the police orchestra and the police helicopter squadron. The BPAs are situated in Munich, Eichstätt, Würzburg, Nuremberg, Königsbrunn, Dachau and Sulzbach-Rosenberg and have 10 companies as the state’s mobile police reserve. The helicopter squadron has nine modern choppers stationed at Munich Airport and Roth Airfield near Nuremberg. Bavaria has two basic training schools, one professional development school and a police dog school.

=== Special Units ===
Bavaria has different special units, which are the

- two Spezialeinsatzkommandos (SEK) (police tactical units), one is stationed in Nuremberg for use in the north of the state and one is attached to the Munich Police Department to cover the south of Bavaria. The SEK of South Bavaria has a mountain detachment for operations in the Alps.
- three Mobile Einsatzkommandos (MEK) (mobile response units), one of which is attached to the SEK based in Nuremberg and the other two to the Munich SEK,
- two Technische Einsatzkommandos (TEK) (technical response units), one at Nuremberg and the other at Munich,
- four Unterstützungskommandos (USK) (Special Support Groups) attached to the Police Support Group and based in Dachau, Munich, Nuremberg and Würzburg
- an Alpine Einsatzzug (Alpine Operations Platoon), based in Rosenheim.

=== Bavarian Security Watch ===
Citizens in Bavaria have been participating in public safety since 1994. This commitment to civic action is seen in the Sicherheitswacht, an auxiliary state police program, where approx. 800 citizens in 125 Bavarian towns (July 2016) voluntarily assist their local police. They have very limited powers (identity verification, questioning and can prohibit people from staying in a certain area) under the principle of proportionality. The only armament is a Pepper spray

== Water Police ==
The Bavarian Water police is directly subordinate to the Bavarian Ministry of the Interior. The headquarters is located in Nuremberg and has 10 river police stations along the Main and Danube rivers and the Main-Danube Canal. It also supports 14 police stations that cover major lakes in Bavaria.

== State Investigation Bureau ==
The Bavarian Landeskriminalamt (State Investigation Bureau) is directly supervised by the Bavarian Interior State Ministry situated in Munich and employs 1,800 officers and civilian staff. Its missions are: witness protection, state security, undercover investigations, statistics, monitoring the development of crime, crime prevention, criminal investigations analysis, exchange of information with foreign countries and forensic science.

== Equipment ==
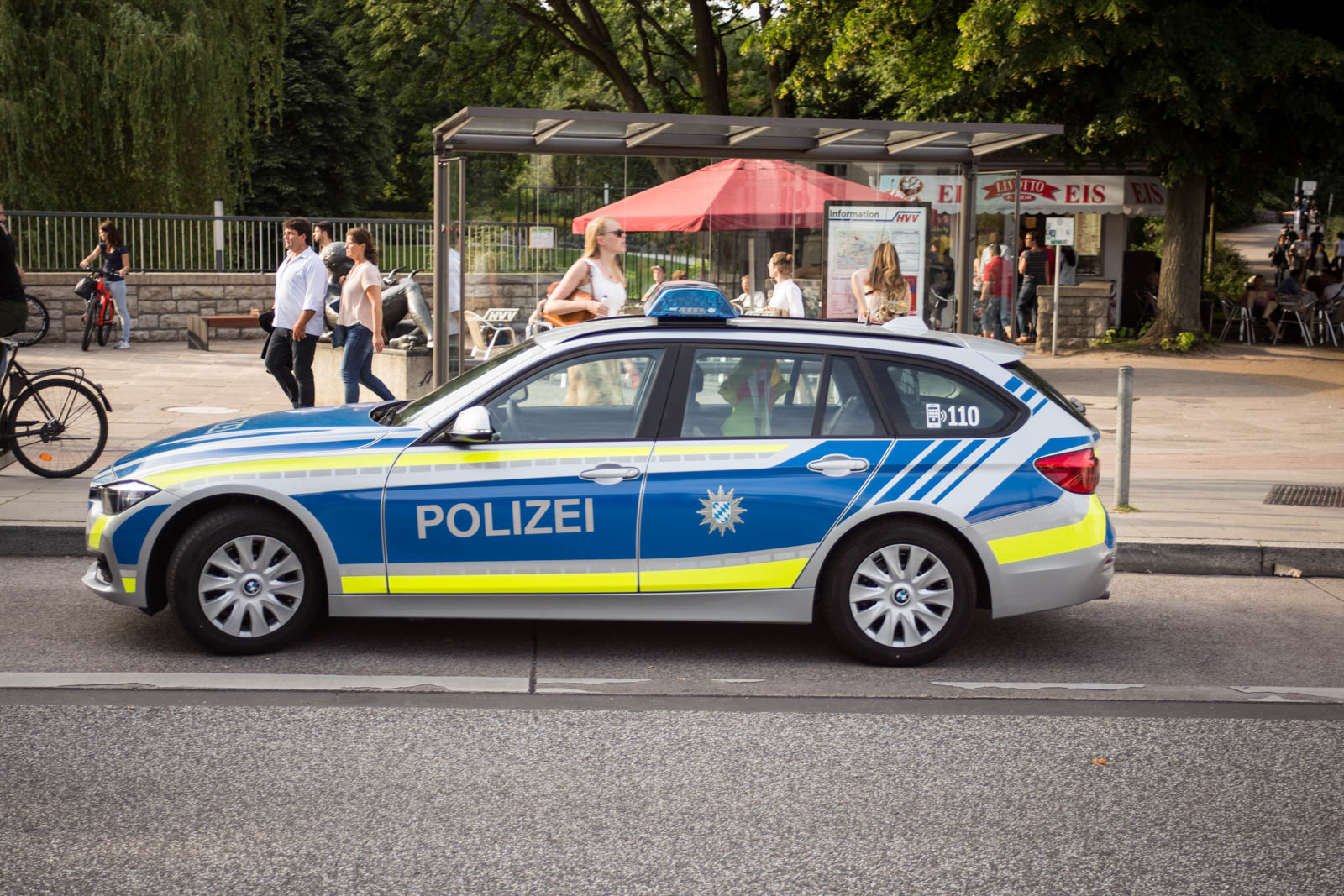
Bavarian police car in 2017

The most used car brand is BMW.

On duty, officers carry their duty handgun (Heckler & Koch VP9) and many other tools, such as handcuffs, pepper spray, a flashlight, an expandable baton and (since 2019) Axon 2 bodycameras.

There are Heckler & Koch MP5 submachine guns for high risk calls in all patrol cars. On top of that, some patrol officers are trained as specialized tactical officers and are skilled in the use of their issued Heckler & Koch G3 and FN SCAR rifles.

== Notable cases ==
- 12 May 1972: Bomb attack on the main building of the Bavarian State Investigation Bureau in Munich by the Red Army Faction, 3 people were injured and 60 police cars were damaged.
- 5 September 1972: Palestinian terrorists attacked the Israeli team during the Olympic Games in Munich, known as the Munich massacre.
- 10 August 1994: Discovery of 363g of plutonium on a smuggler at Munich's Franz Josef Strauss airport; the so-called plutonium affair.
- July 1998: Giorgio Basile who killed 30 people was arrested in Kempten and turned state witness providing testimony for the arrest of 50 Mafia members in Germany.
- 14 January 2005: The fashion designer Rudolph Moshammer was found murdered in his house. One day later the murderer, Herisch Ali Abdullah, was arrested through a DNA analysis match and sentenced to life imprisonment.

== See also ==
- Bavarian Border Police
- Landespolizei
- Joseph Ratzinger Sr. – Bavarian policeman
- Nikolaus Hollweg – Bavarian officer and World War I veteran who was killed by Nazis during the Beer Hall Putsch
