= Lugo, Emilia-Romagna =

Lugo
- Comune
- Città di Lugo
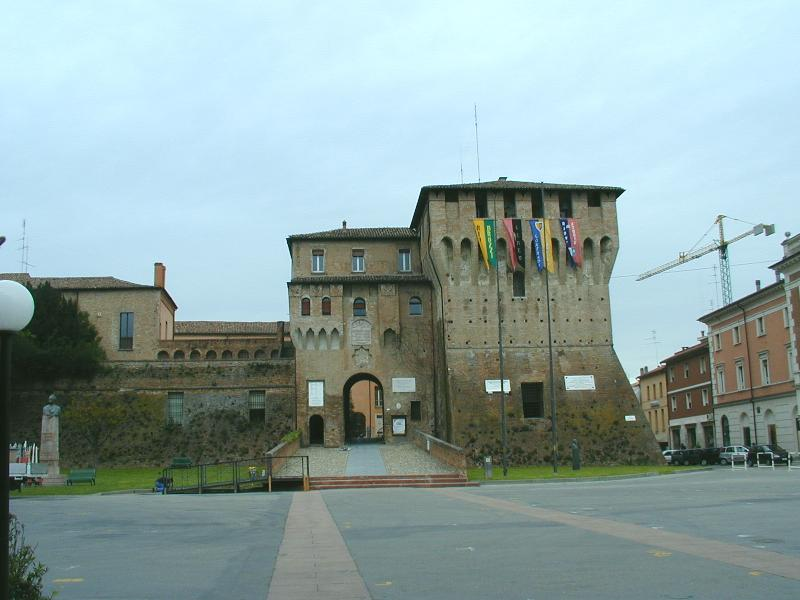
- The Este Castle.

- Coat of arms

- Location within Italy Location within Emilia-Romagna
- Coordinates: 44°25′N 11°55′E
- Country: Italy
- Region: Emilia-Romagna
- Province: Ravenna (RA)
- Frazioni: Ascensione, Belricetto, Bizzuno, Ca' di Lugo, Campanile, Chiesanuova, Ciribella, Giovecca, Malcantone, Passogatto, San Bernardino, San Lorenzo, San Potito, Santa Maria in Fabriago, Torre, Villa San Martino, Viola, Voltana, Zagonara

Government
  - Mayor: Elena Zannoni

Area
  - Total: 116 km^{2} (45 sq mi)
- Elevation: 15 m (49 ft)

Population (30 September 2017)
  - Total: 32,321
  - Density: 279/km^{2} (722/sq mi)
- Demonym: Lughesi
- Time zone: UTC+1 (CET)
  - Summer (DST): UTC+2 (CEST)
- Postal code: 48022
- Dialing code: 0545
- Patron saint: St. Hilary of Galeata
- Saint day: May 15
- Website: Official website

Lugo (Romagnol: Lùgh) is a town and comune in the northern Italian region of Emilia-Romagna, in the province of Ravenna.

== History ==
A settlement in where the city is now is mentioned for the first time in 782 AD, but the names Lucus appears only in 1071. In 1161 it was a fief of the Counts of Cunio, but in 1202 it returned to the Papal States. It was later a possession of the da Polenta, Pepoli, Visconti and Este; the latter maintained it until 1597, when the city was again annexed to the Papal States.

In 1424 the Castle of Zagonara (now destroyed) was the seat of the homonymous battle, in which a Milanese army defeated the Florentines.

When in 1797 the French revolutionary forces invaded northern Italy, Barnaba Chiaramonti (later pope as Pius VII), then still Bishop of Imola, addressed his flock to refrain from useless resistance to the overwhelming and threatening forces of the enemy. The town of Lugo refused to submit to the invaders and was delivered up to a pillage which had an end only when the prelate, who had counselled subjection, supplicantly cast himself on his knees before General Augereau.

In 1859, through plebiscite, Lugo joined the newly born Kingdom of Italy. During World War II, the Senio river formed the frontline between the German and Allied occupation areas from December 1944 until 10 April 1945. The city was liberated by the 1st Jaipur Infantry. A memorial to the Jaipur Infantry was built in the city. The city suffered heavy destruction but recovered quickly after the end of the conflict.

On 19 January 1993 the area near Lugo experienced a meteorite airburst with a yield estimated at 10 kilotonnes of TNT (42 TJ).

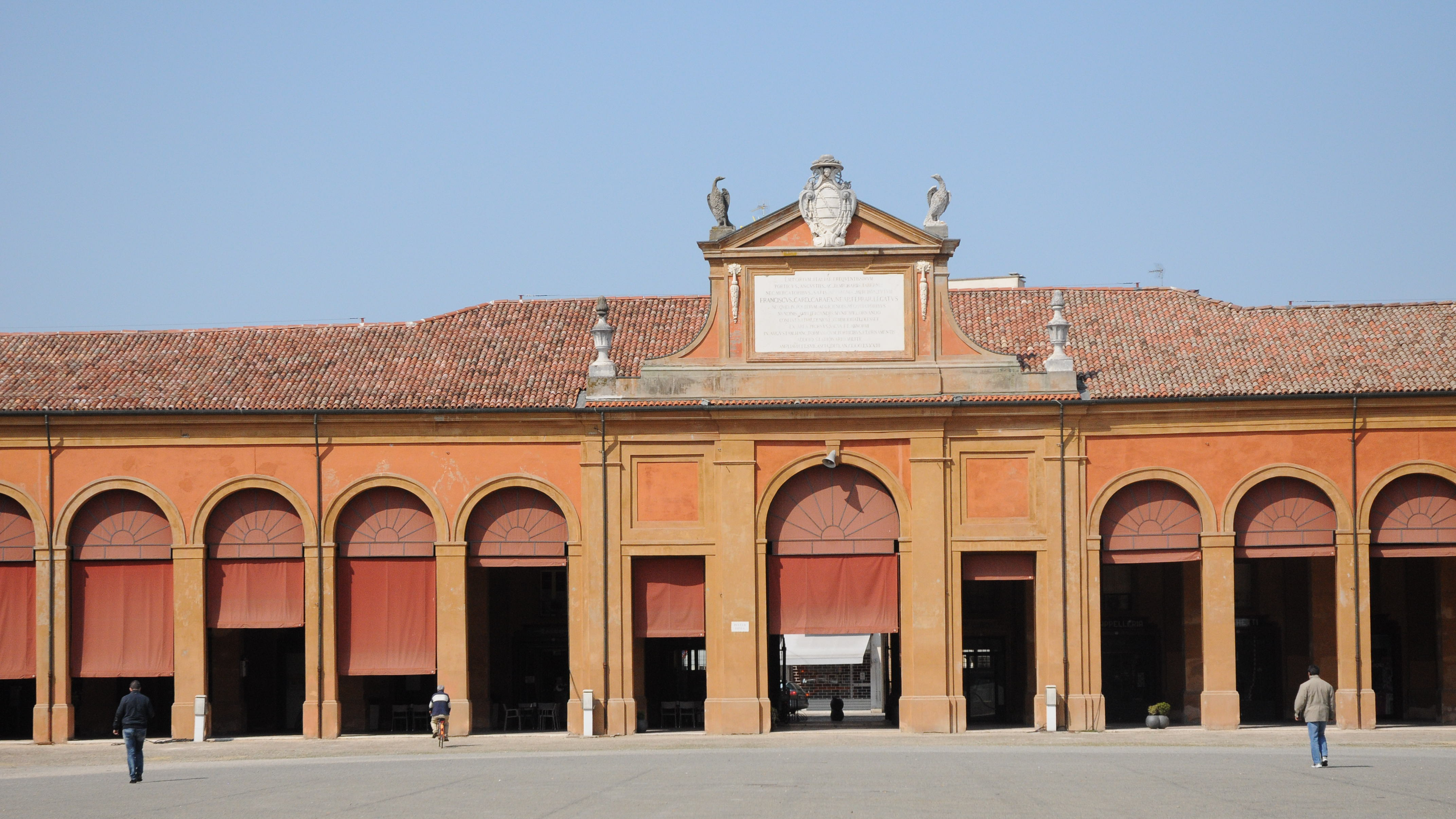
Il Pavaglione

== Main sights ==
- Rocca Estense (Este Castle), the Town Hall from 1797. The current appearance dates from 1500, when the old fortress was rebuilt; the eastern side was erected during the Napoleonic occupation. The interior houses portraits of famous lughesi, a lunette attributed to Mino da Fiesole and a noteworthy 19th-century garden.
- The Pavaglione, former 19th century covered market (mainly known for silkworm trade).
- The Oratorio of Croce Coperta, with 15th-century frescoes.
- The 'Collegiata' church, rebuilt in the 18th century over a 13th-century Franciscan edifice, has a suggestive 15th-century cloister.
- San Francesco di Paola (1890), houses a precious polychrome terracotta sculpture of Dead Christ (15th century).
- Teatro Rossini, now a 445-seat opera house, completely restored between 1984 and 1986 based on its original conception from 1759 and restoration and expansion in 1821.

== People ==
- Gioachino Rossini (1792–1868) – composer
- Giuseppe de Begnis (1793–1849) – operatic bass
- Agostino Codazzi (1793–1859) – cartographer
- Gregorio Ricci-Curbastro (1853–1925) – mathematician
- Attilio Pratella (1856–1949) – painter
- Francesco Balilla Pratella (1880–1955) – composer
- Charles Ponzi (1882–1949) – swindler, known for the Ponzi scheme
- Gustavo Del Vecchio (1883-1972) – economist and politician
- Francesco Baracca (1888–1918) – World War I flying ace
- Fabio Taglioni (1920–2001) – engineer
- Eugenio Berardi (1921–1977) – architect
- Mario Lega (born 1949) – professional motorcycle racer
- Pierluigi Martini (born 1961) – Formula One racing driver
- Lorenzo Baroni (born 1990) – motorcycle racer

== Twin towns ==
- Agustín Codazzi, Colombia
- Choisy-le-Roi, France
- Kulmbach, Germany
- Nervesa della Battaglia, Italy
- (Republic of Ireland) Wexford, Ireland
- Yoqneam, Israel
