= Teatro Rossini (Lugo) =

Opera house in Lugo, Italy

Coordinates: 44°25′13″N 11°54′34″E

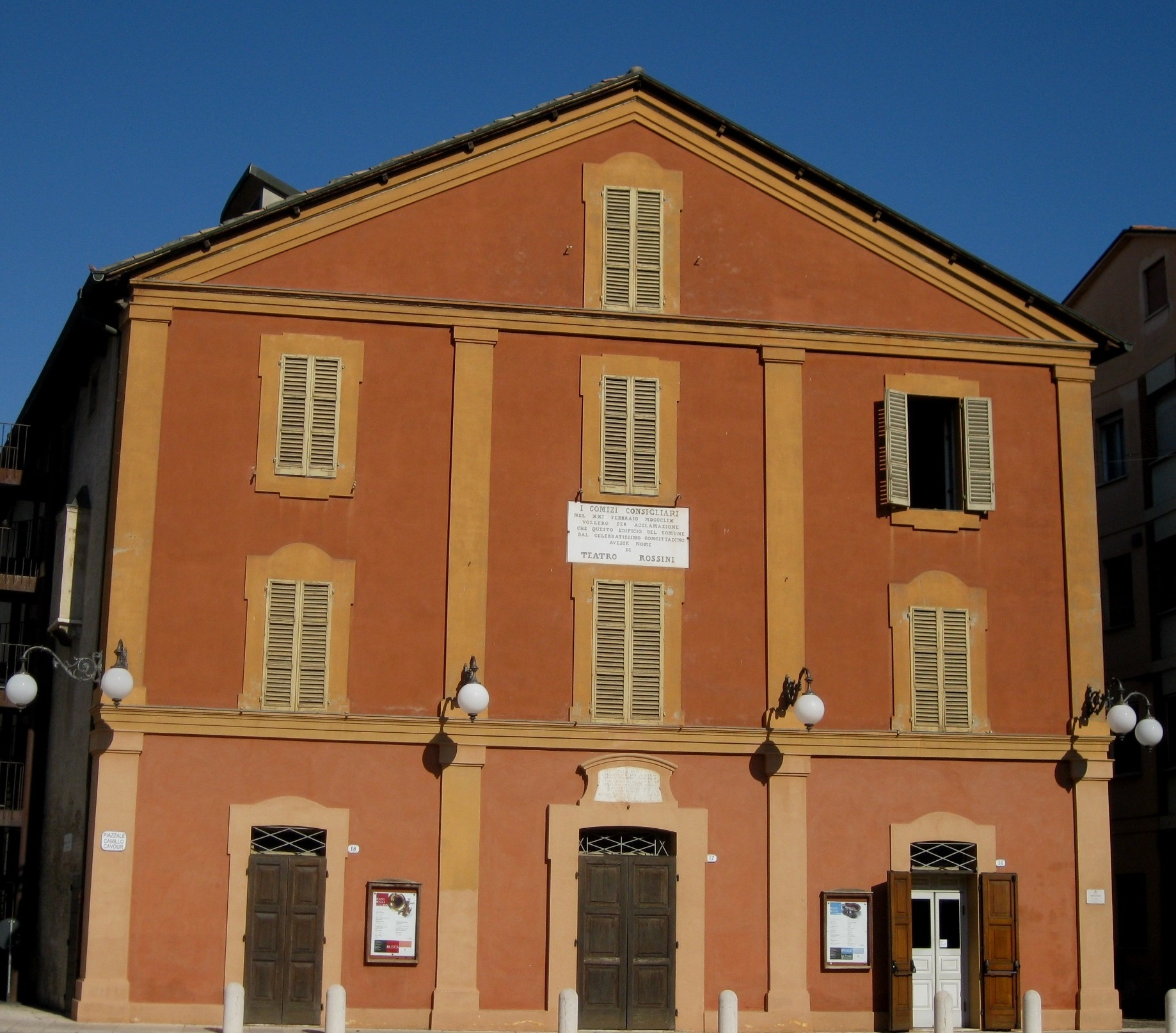

Teatro Rossini is the name of an opera house in Lugo, Italy that serves as an adjunct venue for the work of Teatro Comunale di Bologna.

The Teatro Rossini was built in 1760, its main parts following a design of Ambrogio Petrocchi. Work on its interior, including the stage, seating, and balconies, was completed by Antonio Galli Bibiena. The theater's work has embraced collaborations with Ravenna's Teatro Alighieri and Pesaro's Rossini Foundation, as well as the ties to Bologna. It seats roughly 500.

The theatre took its present name in honour of the composer Gioachino Rossini in 1859.

== See also ==
- List of opera festivals
- List of opera houses
