= Nuremberg–Cheb railway =

Railway line in Germany and the Czech Republic

Nuremberg Hbf – Cheb
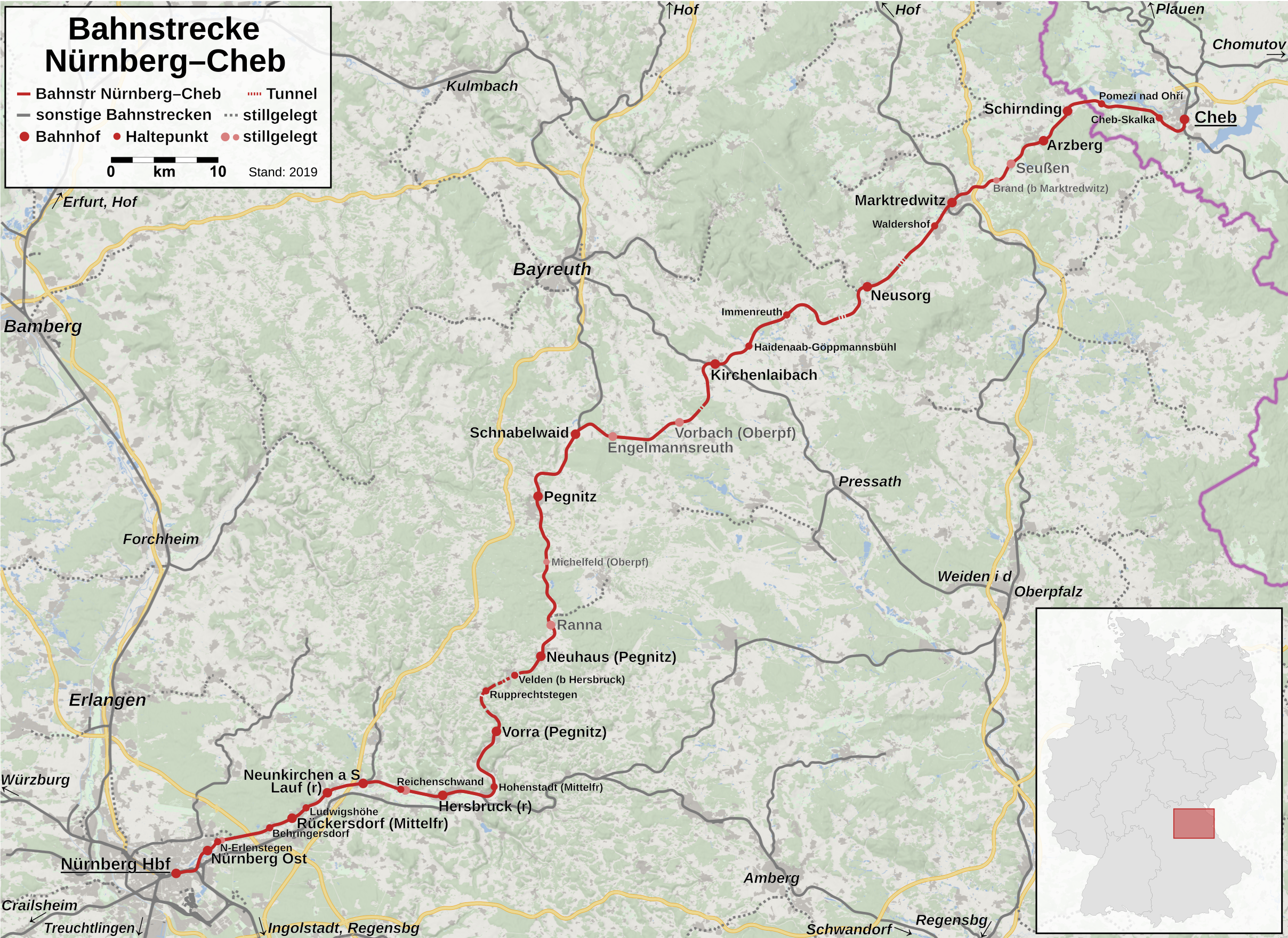

Overview
- Line number: 5903
- Locale: Bavaria, Germany and Czech Republic

Service
- Route number: 512, 544, 860, 891.3

Technical
- Line length: 151.4 km (94.1 mi)
- Number of tracks: 2 (Nürnberg Hbf – Marktredwitz)
- Track gauge: 1,435 mm (4 ft 8 1/2 in) standard gauge
- Electrification: 25 kV/50 Hz AC catenary (Cheb-Skalka – Cheb)
- Operating speed: 160 km/h (99 mph)

The Nuremberg–Cheb railway is a 151 km long, non-electrified main line, mainly in the German state of Bavaria. It runs from Nuremberg via Lauf an der Pegnitz, Hersbruck, Pegnitz, Kirchenlaibach, Marktredwitz and Schirnding to Cheb in the Czech Republic. The route is also known as the Right (bank of the) Pegnitz line (German: rechte Pegnitzstrecke) or the Pegnitz Valley Railway (Pegnitztalbahn). It was built as the Fichtel Mountains Railway (Fichtelgebirgsbahn). The Nuremberg–Schnabelwaid section of it is part of the Saxon-Franconian trunk line (Sachsen-Franken-Magistrale).

== History ==
The line was originally intended to provide a direct link between Nuremberg and Bayreuth, adding to the Bayreuth–Neuenmarkt-Wirsberg branch line opened in 1853 from the Bamberg–Hof section of the Ludwig South-North Railway. Since the route via Bamberg was not a satisfactory solution, planning began on a direct connection to Nuremberg. Several variants were considered, running via: Forchheim–Ebermannstadt, Gräfenberg–Pegnitz, Schnaittach–Betzenstein and Neuhaus–Pegnitz, with the last selected.

A direct connection from Nuremberg to Bohemia was developed in three stages from Schnabelwaid to Cheb (then a mainly German-speaking city in the Austrian Empire, called Eger). First, a year after the opening of the Bayreuth route on 15 May 1878, the section was opened from Schnabelwaid via Kirchenlaibach and Laibach to Marktredwitz. The next section from Marktredwitz to Schirnding followed on 20 November 1879 and the gap from Schirnding to Cheb was closed on 1 November 1883.

The originally single-track line was duplicated in 1898 and 1899 between Nuremberg and Marktredwitz, with traffic cleared to use both tracks in 1901.

=== Opening dates ===
- Nuremberg–Schnabelwaid: 15 July 1877
- Schnabelwaid–Marktredwitz: 15 May 1878
- Marktredwitz–Schirnding: 20 November 1879
- Schirnding–Cheb: 1 November 1883

== Line ==
In the Nuremberg area, the line is called the Right Pegnitz line (rechte Pegnitzstrecke) is used to distinguish it from the Nuremberg–Schwandorf line, which is known as the Left Pegnitz line (linke Pegnitzstrecke), since both lines run parallel with each other between Nuremberg and Hersbruck and on each side of the Pegnitz river. The section of the line that runs from Nuremberg to Pegnitz along the course of the Pegnitz River, with many crossings of it between Hohenstadt and Pegnitz is known as the Pegnitz Valley Railway (Pegnitztalbahn). The entire construction project was known as the Fichtel Range Railway (Fichtelgebirgsbahn) as the central section of the line passes through the Fichtel Mountains.

=== Route ===
The line leaves the Nuremberg station to the east, turns to the left after Dürrenhof S-Bahn station and passes under the lines to Regensburg and to Schwandorf. After crossing the Wöhrder See (lake) the line runs through the southern part of the Nuremberg suburbs of St. Jobst and Erlenstegen, continuing between the Sebald Reichwald (forest) and the Pegnitz through Behringersdorf and Rückersdorf.

On the eastern edge of Lauf the line crosses the A 9 to reach Neunkirchen station where the Schnaittach Valley Railway (Schnaittachtalbahn) branches off to Simmelsdorf-Hüttenbach and runs through Reichenschwand to Hersbruck. Before Hohenstadt the line turns to the left and continues to follow the Pegnitz through Franconian Switzerland and Veldensteiner Forst national park to Pegnitz. In this section, the line crosses the Pegnitz 25 times and runs between Vorra and Neuhaus through a 7 km section with seven tunnels.

After Pegnitz station the line runs next to federal highway B 2 and B 85 to Schnabelwaid station, where the line to Bayreuth branches off. The line runs to the east to Kirchenlaibach, where it meets the Weiden–Bayreuth line. This once important railway junction, which included a rail workshop, is now reduced to a six-track through station with a large area of gravel to its south, which once had rail installations.

After the station, the line turns northeast and runs from now on along the southern edge of the Fichtel Mountains. In Lenau the line turns to the right to run around a spur of the Fichtel Mountains, and then runs through Armannsberg tunnel under the village of Oberwappenöst and continues to Neusorg station where until 1984 the branch line to Fichtelberg branched off. Then the line runs further to the northwest through the Langentheilener Tunnel, where it crosses the Danube-Main watershed, and continues to Waldershof and Marktredwitz.

The route leaves Marktredwitz station to the northeast, crossing under highway B 93 and then runs to the Czech border next to highway B 303. It runs north of Seussen along the Röslau river near the Kohlberg and Lindenberg mountains to Arzberg. After the line passes through the border station of Schirnding, it continues to the east to Cheb, connecting with the line from the south, originating in Plzeň and then runs around the edge of the inner city to Cheb station.

=== Line engineering ===
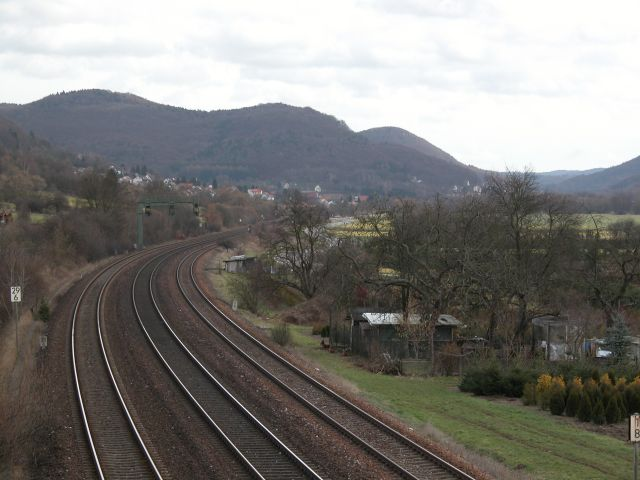
three track section at Hersbruck

The line is a double track from Nuremberg to Marktredwitz and a single track from Marktredwitz to Cheb and is not electrified for its whole length. The line has three tracks from the 27.7 km mark (Hersbruck (rechts Pegnitz) station) to the 29.5 km mark, where the Hersbruck–Pommelsbrunn line branches off. This section has bi-directional signalling. In addition, bi-directional signaling is installed between Rückersdorf and Neunkirchen am Sand and between Vorra and Neuhaus.

612 (RegioSwinger) diesel tilting trains are used on the winding line, operating at a maximum speed of 160 km/h.

=== Transport authority ===
The Nuremberg–Haidenaab-Göppmannsbühl section is integrated in the Greater Nuremberg Transport Association (Verkehrsverbund Großraum Nürnberg, VGN) and served by R3 and R33 trains.

== Services ==
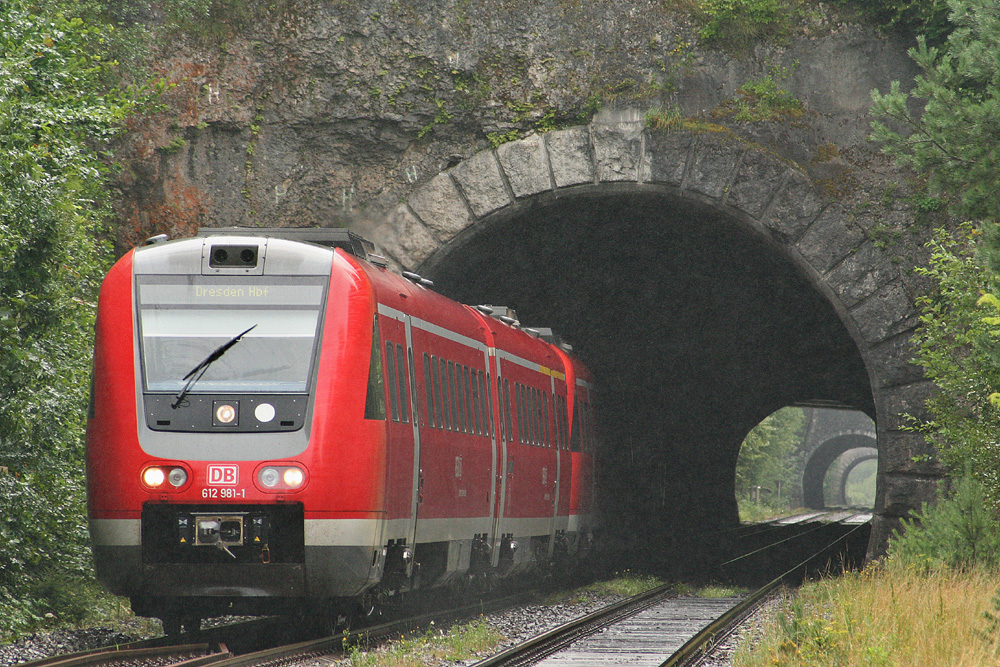
Class 612, running as the Franken-Sachsen-Express to Dresden near Velden

Since the timetable change on 10 December 2006, the Franken-Sachsen-Express Interregio-Express service operates on the line, using class 612 diesel multiple units (DMUs), from Nuremberg via Bayreuth or Marktredwitz to Hof, continuing via Chemnitz to Dresden, replacing an InterCity service. This connection was discontinued at the timetable change in December 2014. Thus, the Nuremberg–Dresden route is now divided at Hof and since then Regional-Express services (RE) run from Nuremberg to Hof and from Hof to Dresden, requiring a change in Hof.

In addition, Regional-Express services run on the Nuremberg–Pegnitz–Bayreuth / Marktredwitz–Hof / Cheb routes with class 612 DMUs. The various Regional-Express services are operated with train portions separating or merging at Hersbruck and Pegnitz stations.

Since 9 December 2012, there have been no long-distance passenger services on the route.

DB Regio Mittelfranken has operated Regionalbahn services on the Nuremberg–Neunkirchen–Neuhaus route since the timetable change on 14 December 2008 under the brand name of Mittelfrankenbahn, using class 648 DMUs. Before the timetable change, class 614 DMUs or class 218 diesel locomotives with n-coach sets were used. Vogtlandbahn operates regionalbahn services from Marktredwitz to Cheb using Siemens Desiro DMUs.

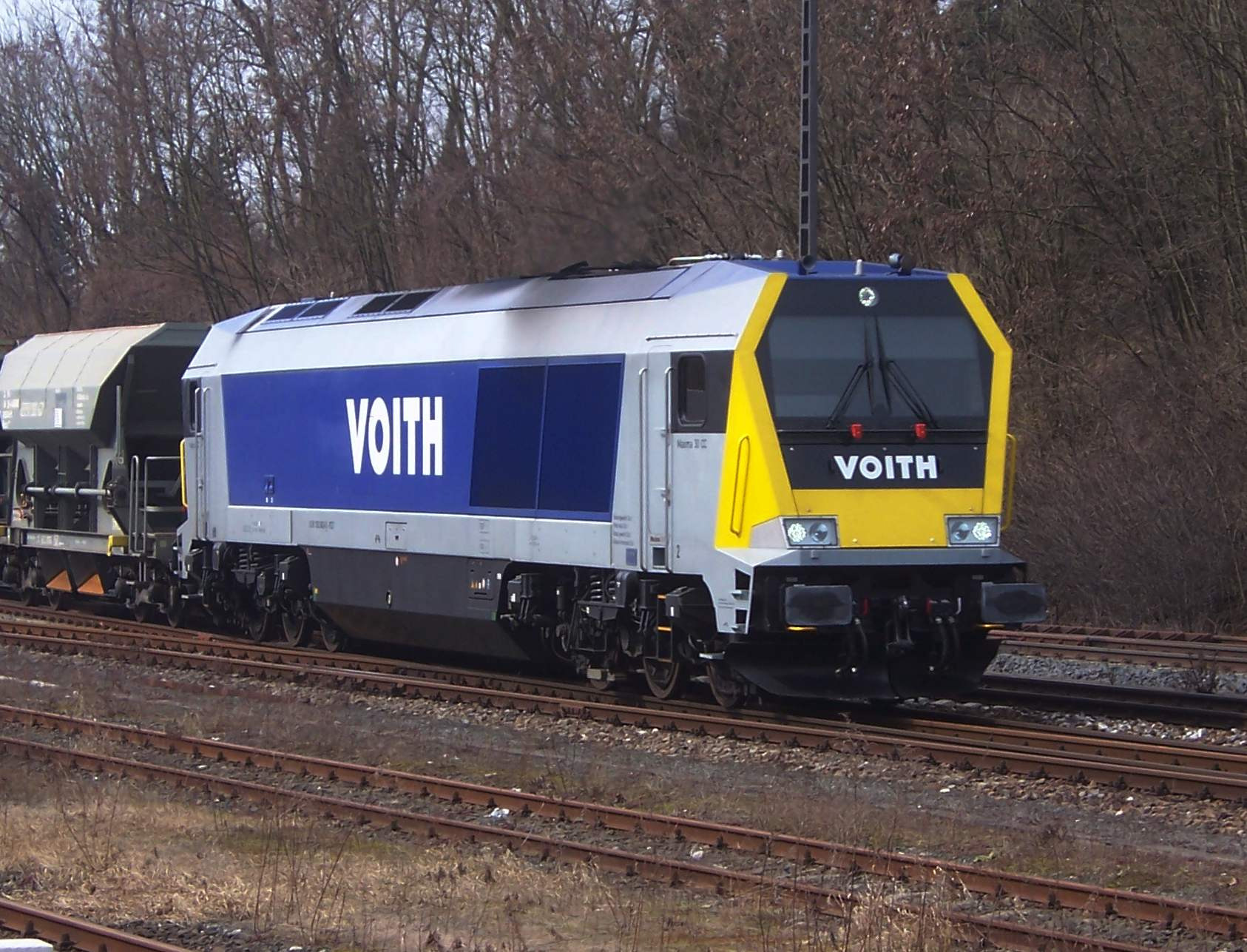
Voith Maxima 30 CC in Hersbruck running to Pegnitz

== Future ==
=== Electrification ===
The track is listed in the Federal Transport Infrastructure Plan as Project No. 16 (Nuremberg–Marktredwitz–Reichenbach/German Czech border) to be electrified by 2018. The cost of the project to the German government is estimated at €467 million. Electrification is particularly difficult in the tunnels between Vorra and Neuhaus. The railway line would have to be closed for several months, moreover several bridges would have to be renewed. In the course of electrification it is planned to extend the network of Nuremberg S-Bahn along this line.
