= Bayreuth Hauptbahnhof =

Railway station in Bayreuth, Germany

Bayreuth Hbf
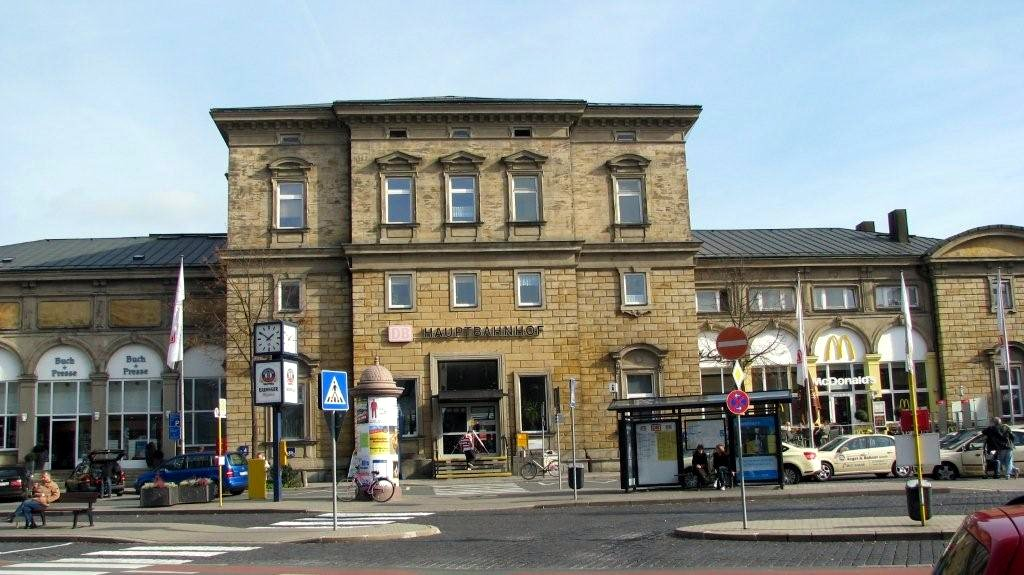
- The station building

General information
- Location: Bahnhofsstraße, 20; Bayreuth, Bavaria; Germany
- Coordinates: 49°57′0″N 11°34′49″E
- Owner: Deutsche Bahn
- Operator: DB Netz; DB Station&Service
- Lines: Neuenmarkt-Wirsberg; Bayreuth–Warmensteinach; Weiden–Bayreuth; Schnabelwaid–Bayreuth; Bayreuth–Hollfeld
- Platforms: 3
- Tracks: 5

Other information
- Station code: 0439
- DS100 code: NBY
- Category: 3
- Fare zone: VGN: 1201
- Website: www.bahnhof.de

Services
Preceding station	DB Regio Bayern	Following station
Creußen (Oberfr) towards Nürnberg Hbf	RE 30	Münchberg towards Hof Hbf
Neuenmarkt-Wirsberg towards Coburg	RE 32	Pegnitz towards Nürnberg Hbf
Trebgast towards Bamberg	RE 38	Creußen (Oberfr) towards Nürnberg Hbf
Preceding station		Following station
Bindlach towards Coburg	RB 24	Terminus
Seybothenreuth towards Weiden (Oberpfalz)	RB 34	Bayreuth-St Georgen towards Weidenberg
Terminus	RB 97	Stockau towards Bad Steben
Location

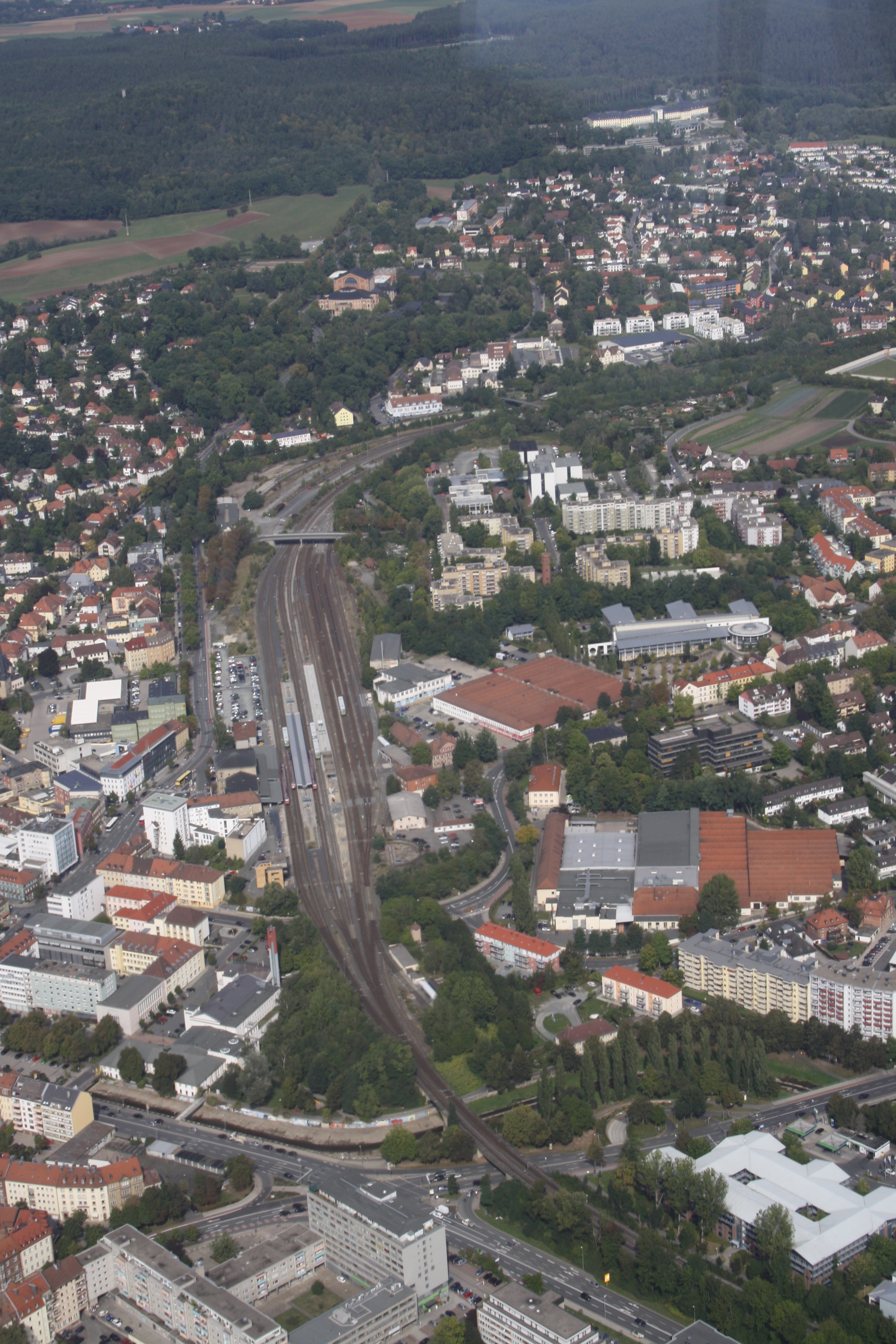
Aerial view of the station

Bayreuth Hauptbahnhof is the main railway station in the German town of Bayreuth, in northern Bavaria.

== Overview ==
Railway lines run north to Neuenmarkt-Wirsberg, and from there to Bamberg and over the Schiefe Ebene to Hof, east to Weidenberg, southeast to Weiden and south to Schnabelwaid with connections to Nuremberg on the Pegnitz Valley Railway. The lines around Bayreuth are all single-tracked and non-electrified.

== Train services ==
Due to the fact that all four railway lines are single-track and non-electrified, Bayreuth is currently only served by regional rail services. From December 2007 until December 2013, the Franken-Sachsen-Express provided a direct connection from Nuremberg to Dresden. The technology used for this was the Class 612 diesel multiple set. After the electrification of the railway between Plauen and Hof in 2013, the Franken-Sachsen-Express required a transfer in Hof and had a longer travel time due to the use of non-tilting electric trains. Later that year, the FSX was rerouted through Marktredwitz for a fully electrified railway.

=== Regional Rail Services ===
Regional routes serving Bayreuth are operated by DB Regio and the private company agilis. Since 2014, regional rail services in Bayreuth have belonged to the Integrated Transport Association of Greater Nuremberg (VGN, for Verkehrsverbund Großraum Nürnberg). There are Regional-Express links via Lichtenfels to Bamberg and Würzburg, and via Lichtenfels and Kronach to Saalfeld.

Beginning on 23 May 1992, tilting diesel multiple units of Class 610 have worked the railway through the Pegnitz valley from Nuremberg to Bayreuth. These were bought by the former Deutsche Bundesbahn specifically for the winding railway. These trains proved quite reliable and reduced the travel time significantly. Today, DB Regio uses the Class 612 DMUs exclusively, and agilis operates the Stadler Regio-Shuttle RS1.

Line	Route	Frequency	Operator
RE 30	Hof – Bayreuth – Pegnitz – Nürnberg	60 min	DB Regio Bayern
RE 32	Nürnberg – Bayreuth – Kulmbach – Lichtenfels – Coburg	120 min	DB Regio Bayern
RE 38	Nürnberg – Bayreuth – Kulmbach – Lichtenfels – Bamberg	120 min	DB Regio Bayern
RB 24	Bayreuth – Kulmbach – Lichtenfels – Coburg	60 min	agilis
RB 34	Weiden (Oberpf) – Kirchenlaibach – Bayreuth – Weidenberg	60 min	agilis
RB 97	Bad Steben – Hof – Marktredwitz – Kirchenlaibach – Bayreuth	60 min	agilis

== Gallery ==
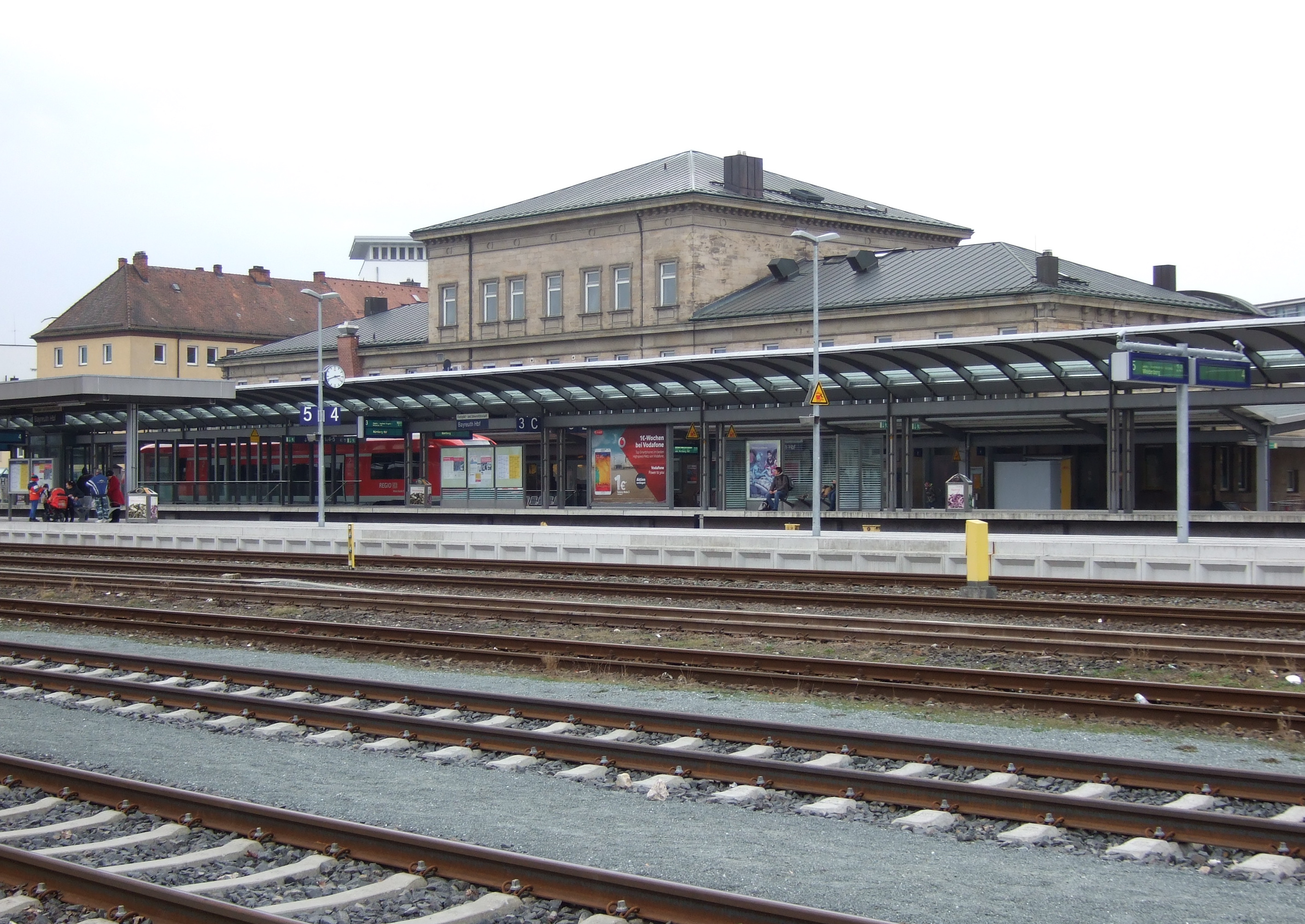
The station building seen from the track side

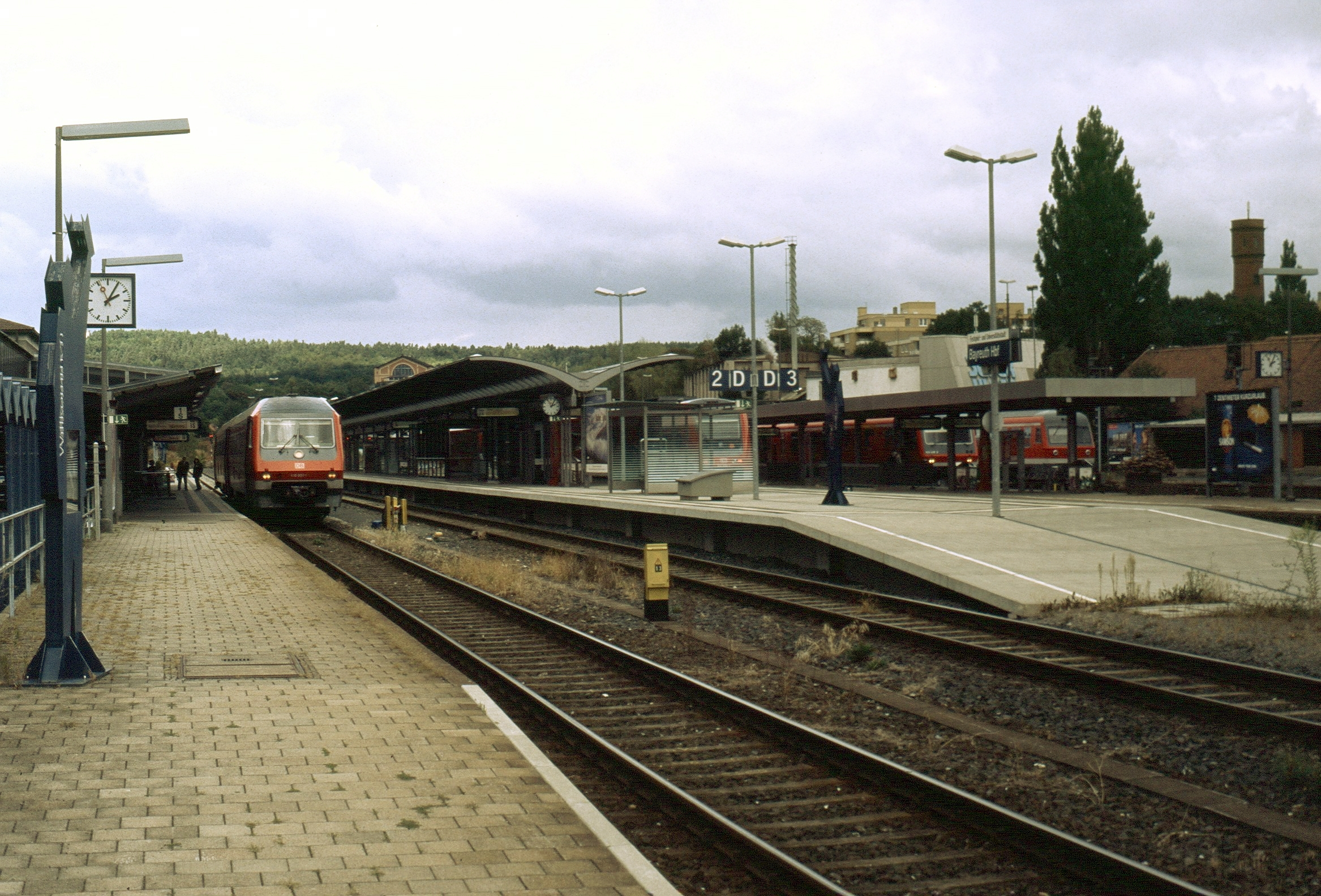
View of the platforms

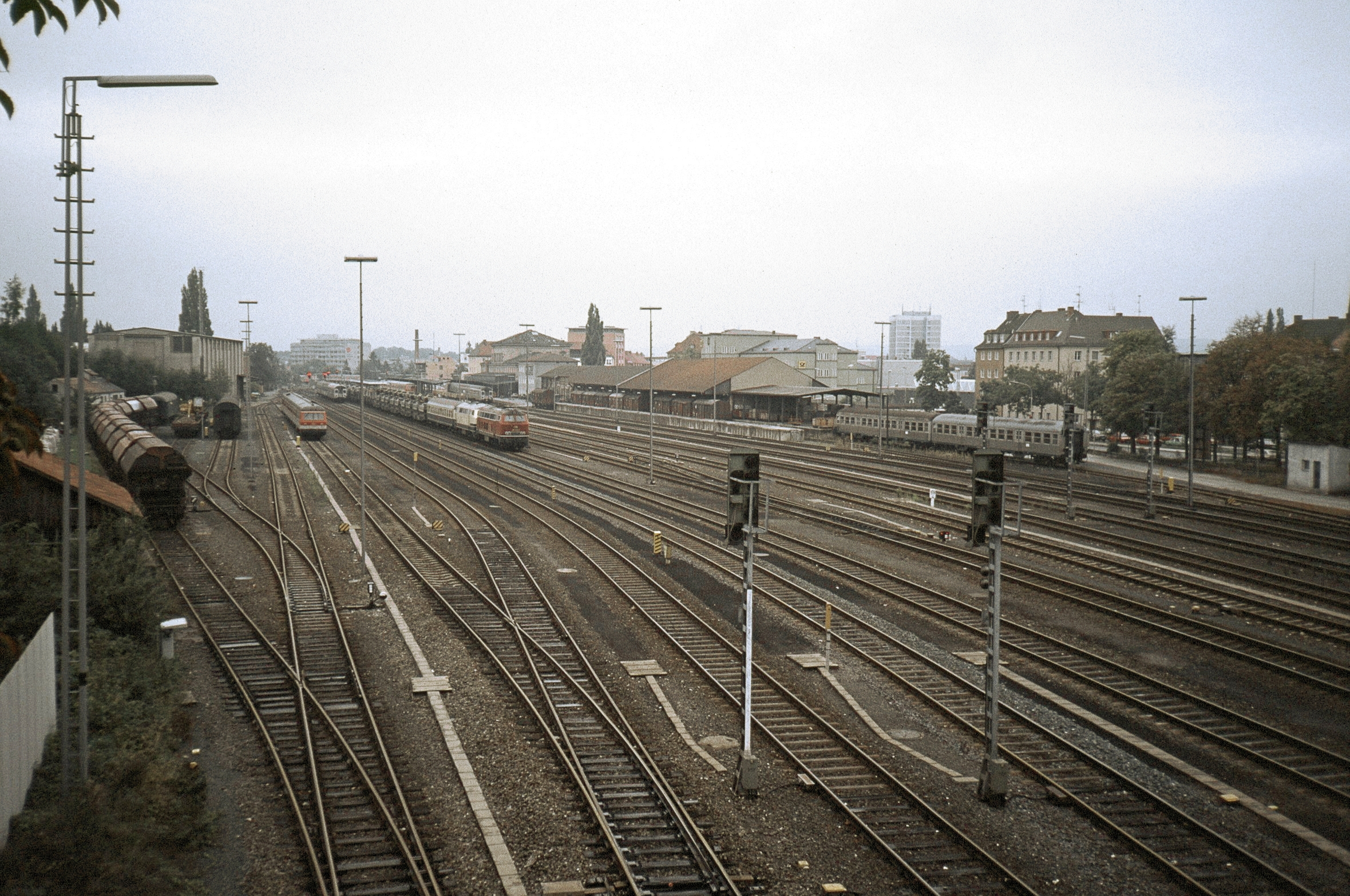
The station in 1987

== Literature ==
- Robert Zintl: Bayreuth und die Eisenbahn. Gondrom, Bindlach 1992, ISBN 3811207806

== See also ==
- List of railway stations in Bavaria
