= Weiden–Bayreuth railway =

Major railway in the German state of Bavaria

Overview
- Line number: 5051
- Locale: Bavaria, Germany

Service
- Route number: 867

Technical
- Line length: 58.1 km (36.1 mi)
- Track gauge: 1,435 mm (4 ft 8 1/2 in) standard gauge
- Operating speed: 120 km/h (75 mph)

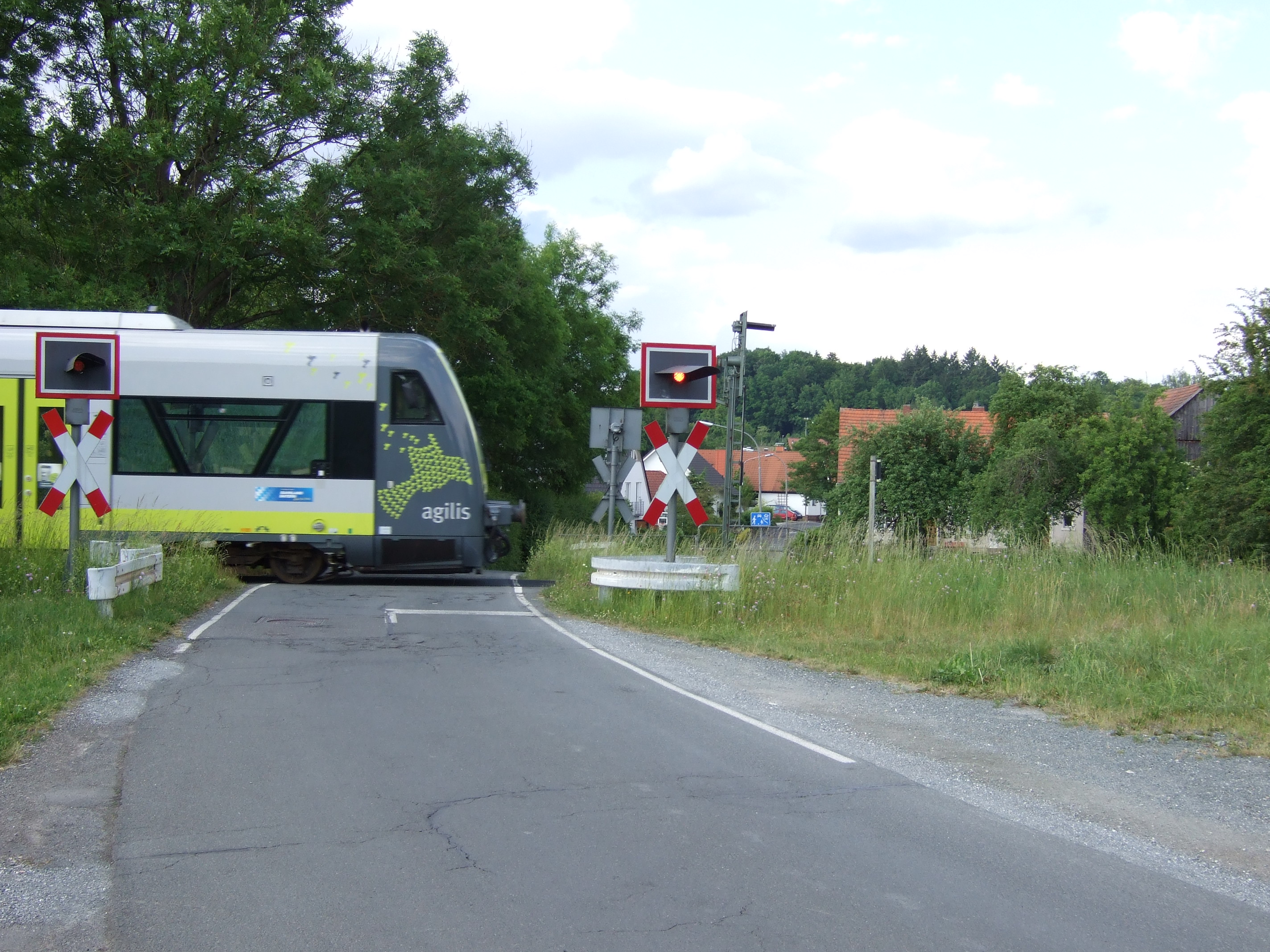
Diesel multiple unit on Wunaustraße level crossing in Bayreuth

The Weiden–Bayreuth railway is a major railway in the German state of Bavaria. It connects Weiden in der Oberpfalz, Kirchenlaibach and Bayreuth.

== History ==
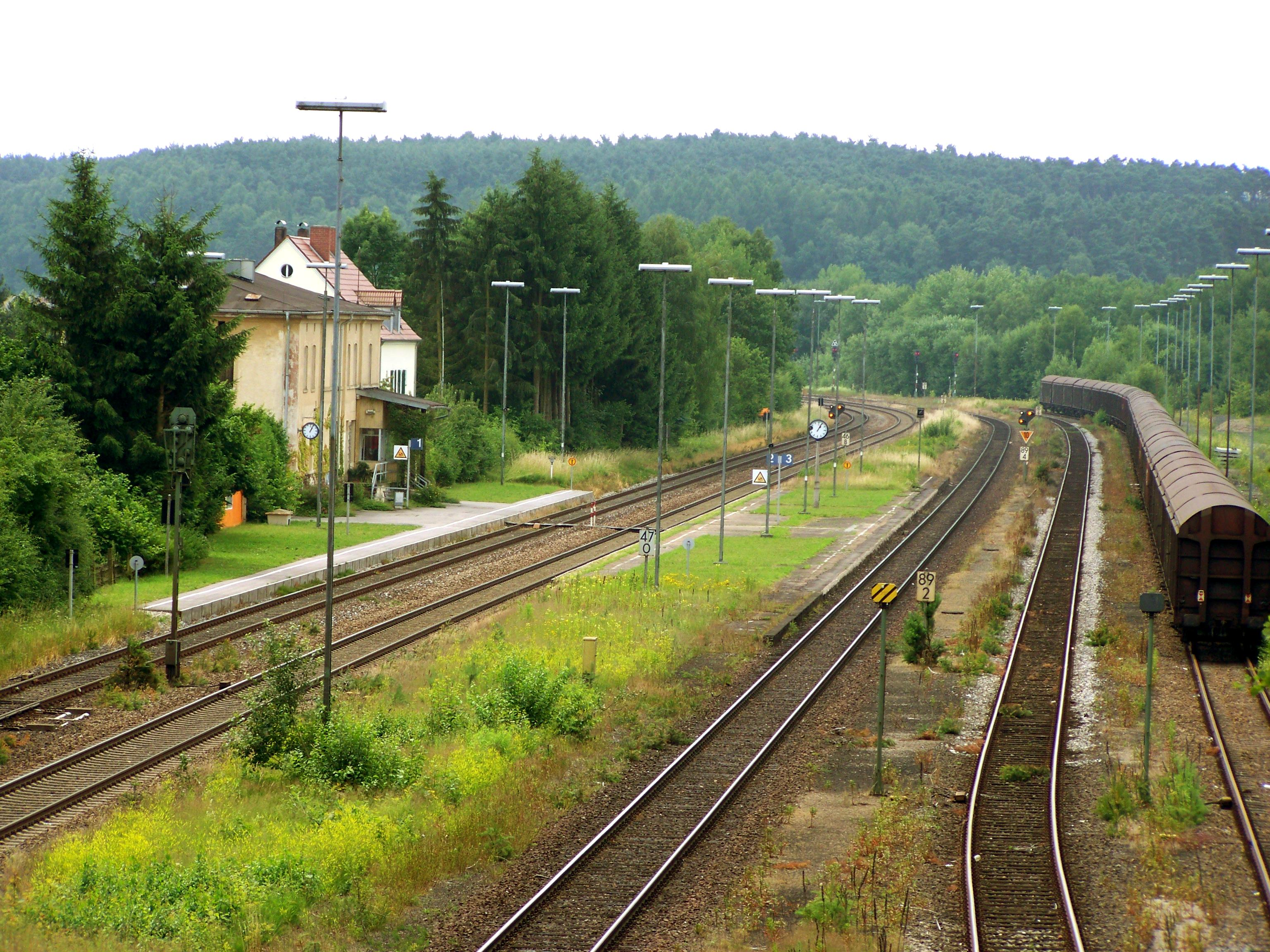
Irrenlohe station, left the tracks from Weiden in 2009

The Bavarian Eastern Railway Company (Bavarian Ostbahn) gained the concession to build the line was on 3 January 1862. Construction began later that year and was completed on 1 December 1863. From Schwandorf station to Irrenlohe station its single track ran parallel with the also single-track Regensburg–Schwandorf–Amberg–Nuremberg line of the Eastern Railway. It ended in its own station in Bayreuth south of the former Brandenburger Thor (Brandenburg Gate, the location of the station of the state railway, the current Bayreuth Hauptbahnhof), which had a roundhouse, a goods shed, a carriage shed and a residential block for railway officials. To reduce costs, however, passenger traffic was handled from the beginning at the platform of the Bayreuth–Neuenmarkt-Wirsberg railway.

With the commissioning of the Eastern Railway line, the former Bayreuth terminus became a through station on the Hof–Bayreuth–Weiden–Regensburg–Munich route, which at first required changes in Bayreuth and Irrenlohe. As a result, the line from Bayreuth to Munich was 40 Bavarian miles long, 12.5 miles shorter than via Augsburg (a Bavarian mile equalled 7,420.4 or 7,414.9 metres). Train crossings were scheduled at Parkstein-Hütten, Kemnath-Neustadt, Kirchenlaibach and Seybothenreuth.

Initially, three pairs of passenger trains operated between Bayreuth and Irrenlohe. In international traffic, a passenger train (Courierzug—courier train—with exclusively first class carriages) running without changing carriages between Cologne and Vienna was added in the 1860s.

On 1 January 1876, the Bavarian Eastern Railway Company was nationalised and the line was taken over by the Royal Bavarian State Railways (Königlich Bayerische Staats-Eisenbahnen). The two Bayreuth stations were merged at the same time, requiring a change to the track layout.

The Schwandorf–Weiden section is now considered to be part of the Regensburg–Weiden railway.

== Route ==
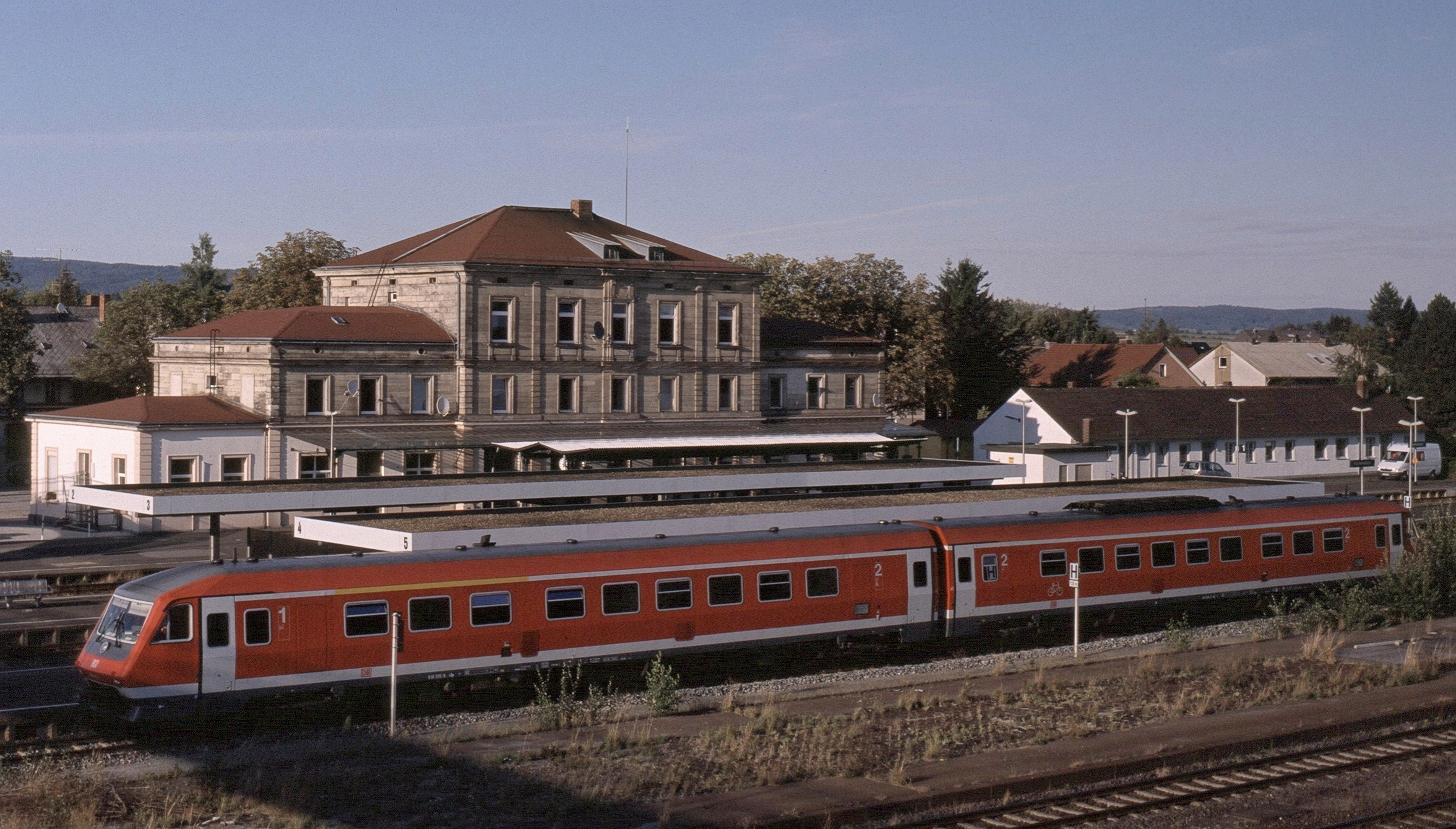
Kirchenlaibach station with class 610 set, 2003

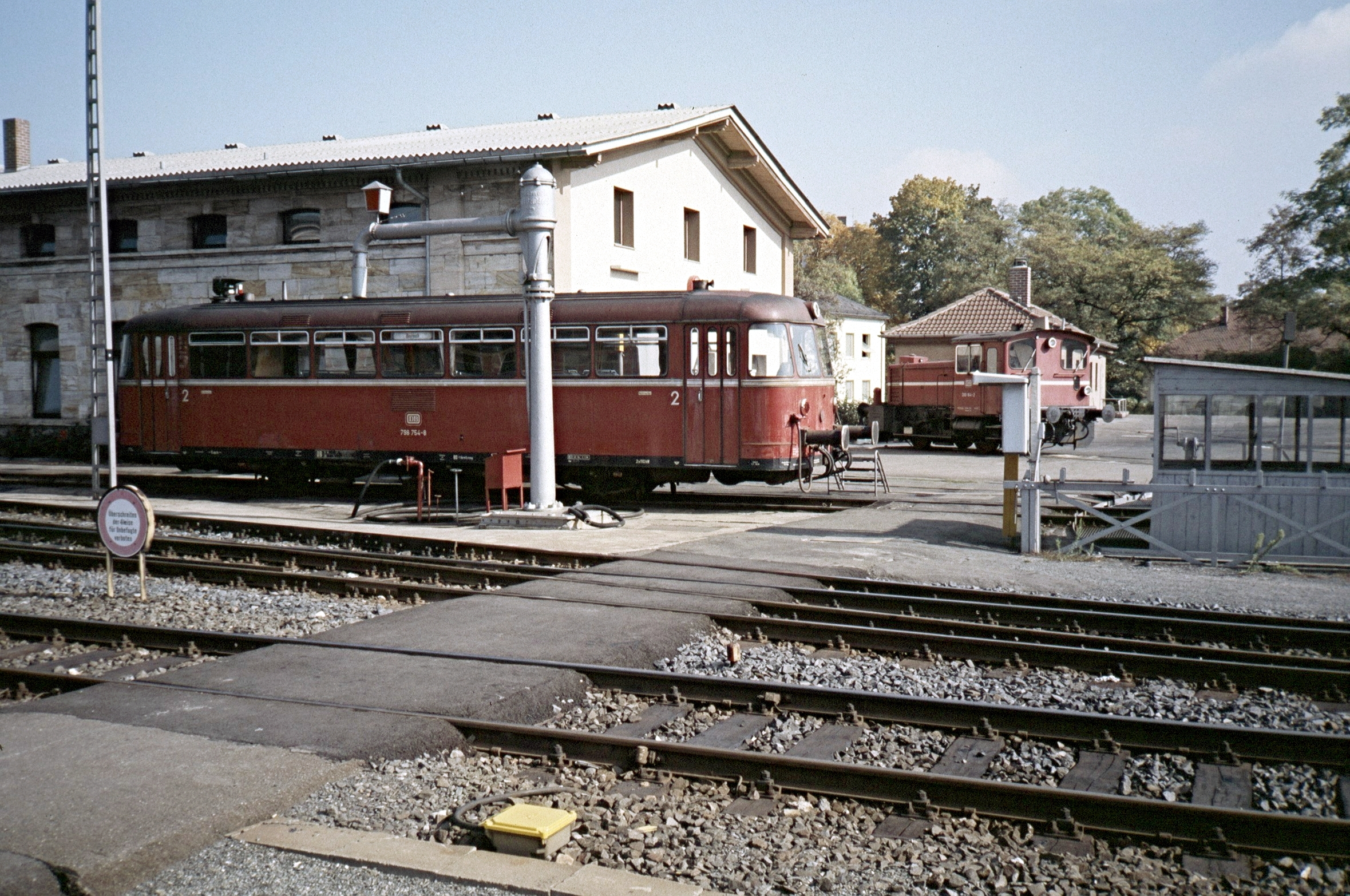
Class VT 98 railbus in front of the former Ostbahn carriage shed in Bayreuth, 1986

The line branches from the Regensburg–Weiden railway at Weiden station and proceeds along the B 470 highway through the Weiden suburbs of Rehbühl and Weiden-West and past the Seltmann porcelain factory. Near the Brandweiher estate the route swings to the southwest and then runs northwest through the Manteler forest and from Schwarzenbach along the Haidenaab to Pressath. In Pressath a branch line to Kirchenthumbach branched off until 1962 and there is still a siding to the Grafenwöhr training camp. Next, the line runs along the Haidenaab, passing to the east side of Rauher Kulm and meets the Nuremberg–Cheb railway at Kirchenlaibach station. After Kirchenlaibach station the line runs to the northwest along the B 22 through the Seybothenreuth forest and between the Pensenberg and Schlehenberg mountains to Bayreuth. The line passes through the Bayreuth districts of Grunau, Colmdorf and Neue Heimat and then reaches the line from Schnabelwaid. The two lines run parallel across the valley of the Red Main river on a nearly 1.5 km long embankment; the line from Weiden runs on the eastern track. Coming from the south the two lines cross the B 22 (Wieland-Wagner-Strasse), then the Bayreuth mill canal and finally, just before the entrance to Bayreuth station, it crosses the B 2 (Albrecht-Dürer-Straße) and immediately afterwards the Red Main.

=== Track standard ===
The route is single track over its entire length and not electrified.

== Rolling stock ==
Rail services on the line are operated by Agilis with Stadler Regio-Shuttle RS1 diesel railcars.
