= Schnabelwaid–Bayreuth railway =

Railway line in Upper Palatinate, Germany

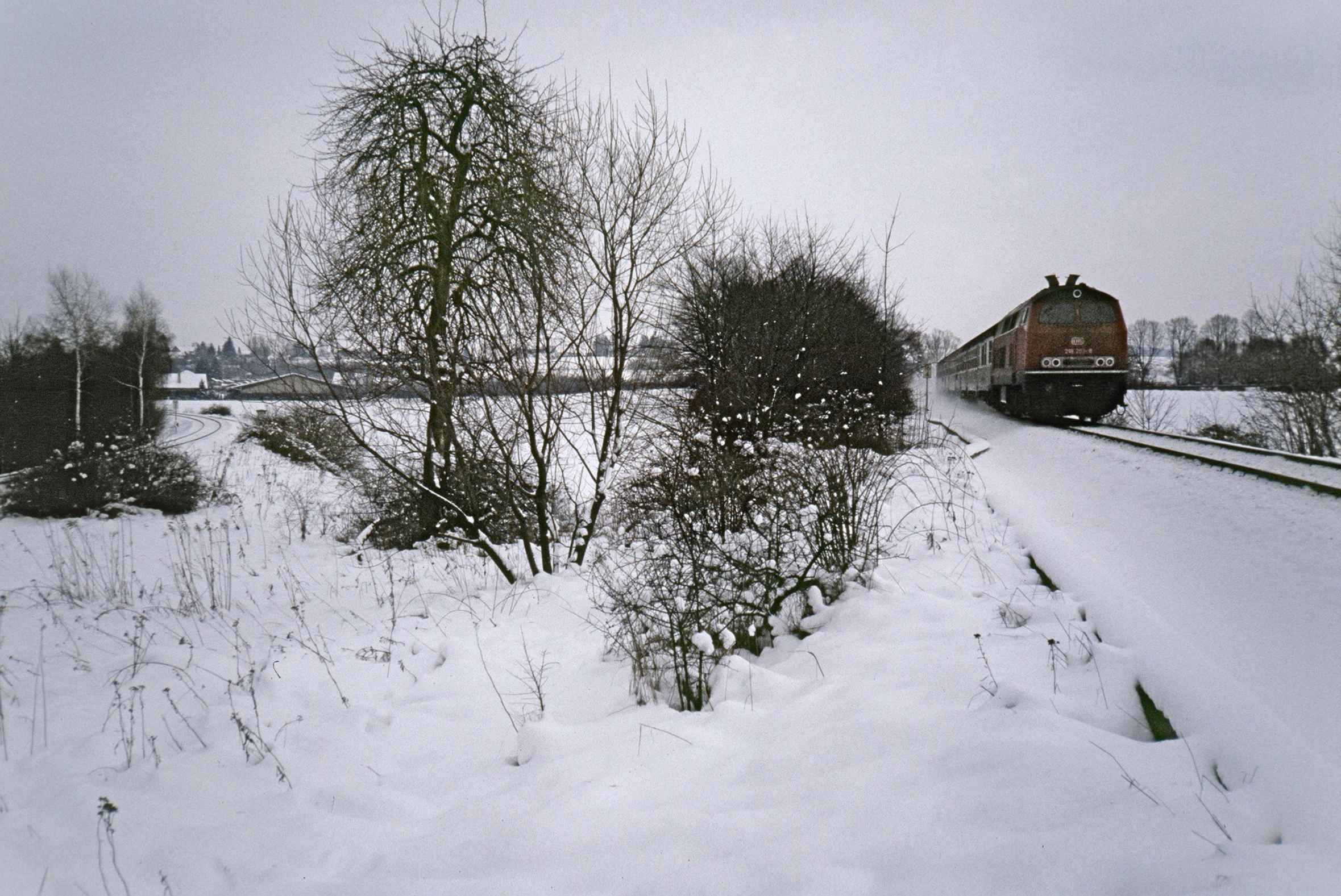
- Kreuzstein junction (left: Ostbahn to Weiden)

Overview
- Line number: 5001
- Locale: Bavaria, Germany

Service
- Route number: 512, 860

Technical
- Line length: 18.2 km (11.3 mi)
- Track gauge: 1,435 mm (4 ft 8 1/2 in) standard gauge
- Operating speed: 140 km/h (87 mph)

The Schnabelwaid–Bayreuth railway is an 18.2 km long single-track main line from Schnabelwaid via Creußen to Bayreuth in the German state of Bavaria. It is part of the Saxon-Franconian trunk line (German: Sachsen-Franken-Magistrale).

== History ==
The line was built as a continuation of the Pegnitz Valley Railway from Nuremberg to Pegnitz to provide a direct connection from Bayreuth to Nuremberg that was shorter than the branch line opened in 1853 from Neuenmarkt-Wirsberg on the Ludwig South-North Railway. It was opened on 15 July 1877.

== Route ==
The line branches off the Nuremberg–Cheb line at Schnabelwaid station and runs north next to highways B 2 and B 85 and the Red Main river to Bayreuth.

Just south of Bayreuth station the line crosses the valley of the Red Main on a 1.5 km-long embankment. On this embankment to the east of the Schnabelwaid–Bayreuth line is the parallel track of the Weiden–Bayreuth line. The two tracks cross the B 22 (Wieland-Wager Straße), the Bayreuth mill canal and finally, just before the entrance to Bayreuth station, the B 2 (Albrecht-Dürer Straße) and immediately afterwards the Red Main.

=== Line standards ===
The route is single track for its entire length and has passing places for trains at Creußen and Neuenreuth stations. The line has a maximum speed of 140 km/h.

== Services ==
Regional-Express services run every two hours, using class 612 diesel multiple units (DMUs) (RegioSwingers), from Nuremberg via Pegnitz, Bayreuth, Münchberg to Hof. Until the timetable change in December 2013, these trains were operated as Interregio-Expresses, continuing to Chemnitz and Dresden. Since the electrification of the Saxon-Franconian trunk line between Hof and Dresden, the service has ended in Hof, so a change is required. In addition, class 612 sets are used to operate Regional-Express services from Nuremberg to Bayreuth and school services. Since December 2013, there has also been a direct service operated with class 612 sets from Lichtenfels to Nuremberg via Kulmbach, Neuenmarkt-Wirsberg and Bayreuth. Since the accession of the district and the city of Bayreuth, the line has been fully integrated into the Verkehrsverbund Großraum Nürnberg (VGN), which organises regional rail services, and is served by Regionalbahn service R3.
