= Hersbruck–Pommelsbrunn railway =

Railway line in Germany

Hersbruck–Pommelsbrunn

Overview
- Line number: 5926
- Locale: Bavaria, Germany

Service
- Route number: 870

Technical
- Line length: 5.4 km
- Track gauge: 1435 mm
- Operating speed: 100 km/h max.

The Hersbruck–Pommelsbrunn railway is a 5.4 km long mainline railway in the German state of Bavaria, which connects the Nuremberg–Cheb and Nuremberg–Schwandorf lines to each other.

== History ==
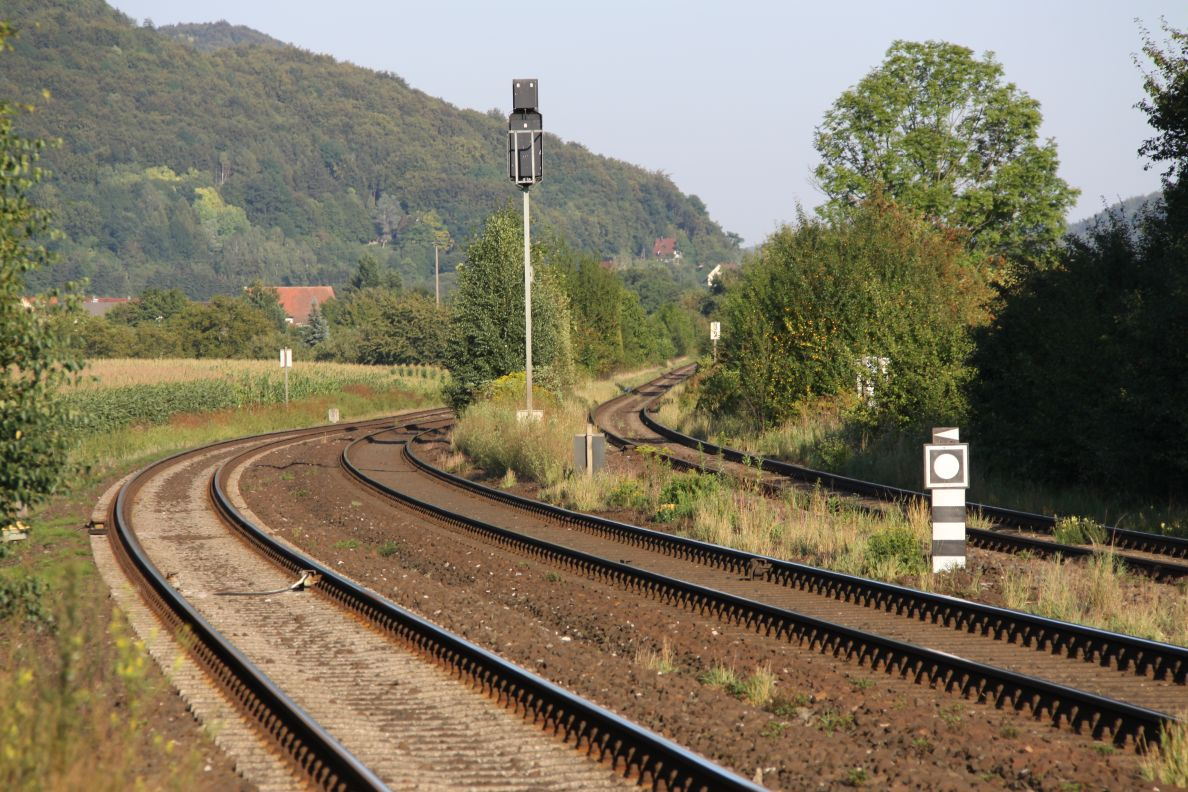
View from Hersbruck Ost to the east: the right track runs to Pommelsbrunn

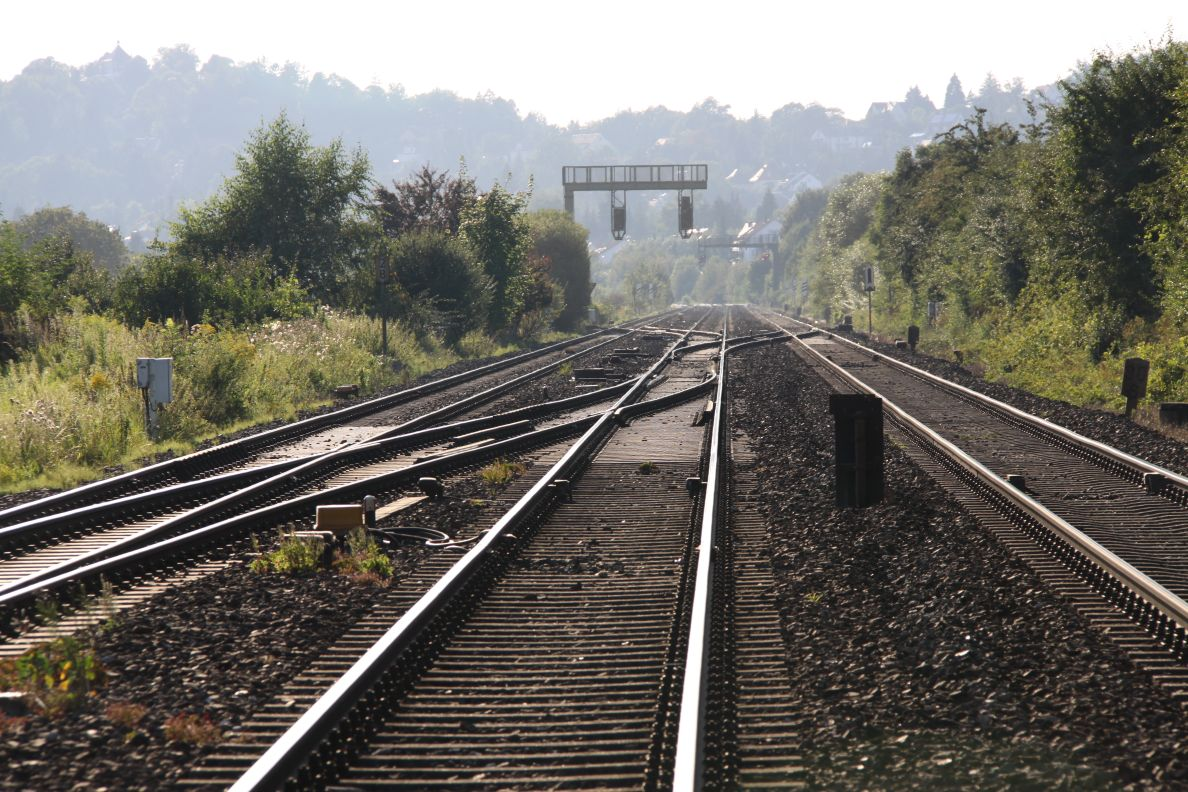
View of the tracks from Hersbruck Ost

Iron ore was long mined in the Auerbach area. The Hersbruck–Pommelsbrunn link was built by the Bavarian State Railways for the carriage of this ore to the former Maxhütte steelworks in Sulzbach-Rosenberg and it was opened on 15 October 1877.

== Route ==
The line begins at Hersbruck (rechts Pegnitz) station and runs in an easterly direction parallel with the two-track Nuremberg–Cheb line to a level crossing with the road connecting Hersbruck and Hohenstadt. It then climbs a ramp onto an embankment and turn at the beginning of the village of Hohenstadt to the southeast, first crossing the Pegnitz and then federal highway B14 and meets the Nuremberg–Schwandorf line at Pommelsbrunn depot, a former station, now without passenger facilities.

== Operations ==
The connecting line is now used by Regional-Express services on the Nuremberg–Hersbruck (rechts Pegnitz)–Neukirchen (b. Sulzbach-Rosenberg)–Neustadt an der Waldnaab / Schwandorf routes. These run from Nuremberg to Hersbruck on the Right Pegnitz line with some trains to Bayreuth and Marktredwitz uncoupled in Hersbruck. Diesel multiple units of class 610 (Pendolino) and 612 (RegioSwinger tilting trains) are used on the line.
