= Neusorg–Fichtelberg railway =

Overview
- Line number: 5030

Technical
- Line length: 14.7 km (9.1 mi)
- Track gauge: 1,435 mm (4 ft 8 1/2 in)

The Neusorg–Fichtelberg railway was a German branch line northern Bavaria. It linked the town of Fichtelberg in the Upper Franconian county of Bayreuth with Neusorg station in the Upper Palatine county of Tirschenreuth on the main line from Nuremberg to Cheb. This standard gauge, single-track Lokalbahn ('local line') was 14.7 km long and was opened on 20 December 1890 by the Royal Bavarian State Railways.

The line ran in a northwesterly direction along the valley of the Fichtelnaab river up into the Fichtel Mountains. Passing through Ebnath and Brand it reached its terminus, the climatic health resort of Fichtelberg at a height of 720 m above sea level, where, for centuries, there had been a mining industry. The town was the highest terminal station of all branch lines in the Fichtel Mountains.

During the early decades no more than three pairs of trains ran daily on workdays fuhren, in 1939 there were four and in 1957 even as many as eight. On Sundays the number of trains rose from three to six over the course of the years. As the Deutsche Bundesbahn (DB) increasingly withdrew itself from the area, services reduced from 1975 to just one train, which left in the morning during the week from Fichtelberg to Kirchenlaibach and returned from Schirnding in the evening. The rest of the time a DB bus was laid on. On 30 May 1976 passenger services on the railway stopped completely. Goods traffic continued until 30 September 1984, and an industrial siding on the other side of Brand was worked until the end of the year.

== See also ==
- Royal Bavarian State Railways
- Bavarian branch lines
- List of closed railway lines in Bavaria

== Sources ==
- Gerald Hoch, Andreas Kuhfahl: Nebenbahnen in der Oberpfalz. Neustadt bei Coburg 2000
- Wolfgang Bleiweis, Ekkehard Martin, Stefan Winkler: Fränkische Nebenbahnen einst und jetzt – Oberfranken. Egglham und München 1986
