= Bindlach station =

Railway station in Bayreuth, Germany

Bindlach
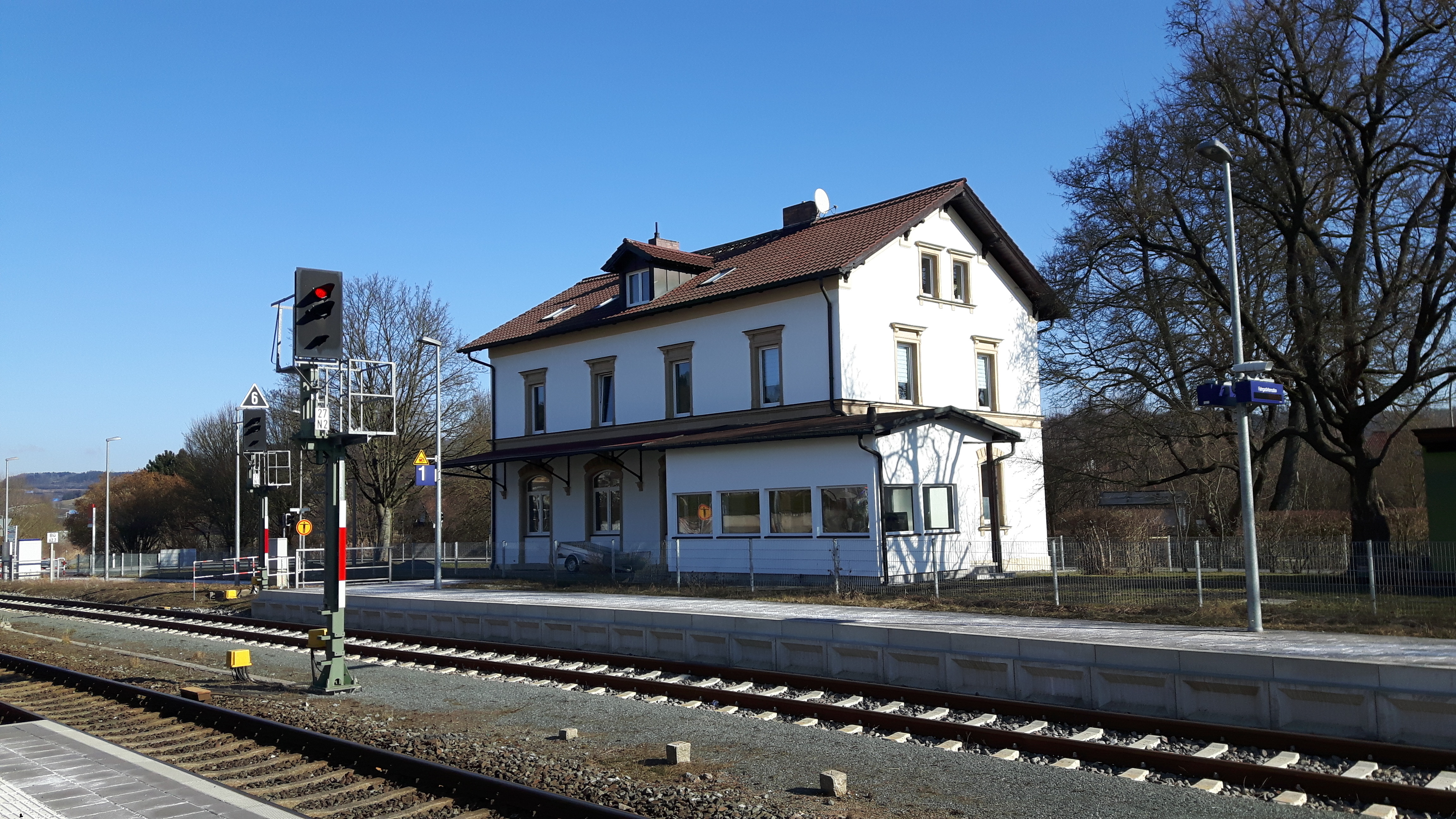
- 2018

General information
- Location: Bahnhofstraße 23; 95463 Bindlach; Bavaria; Germany
- Coordinates: 49°58′49″N 11°36′13″E
- Owner: DB Netz
- Operator: DB Station&Service
- Lines: Bayreuth–Neuenmarkt-Wirsberg railway (KBS 852)
- Platforms: 2 side platforms
- Tracks: 2

Other information
- Station code: 648
- DS100 code: NBI
- IBNR: 8000974
- Category: 6
- Fare zone: VGN: 1251
- Website: www.bahnhof.de

Services
Preceding station		Following station
Ramsenthal towards Coburg	RB 24	Bayreuth Hbf Terminus
Location
- Location within Bavaria

Bindlach station is a railway station in the municipality of Bindlach, located in the district of Bayreuth in Upper Franconia, Germany.
