= Neunkirchen am Sand–Simmelsdorf-Hüttenbach railway =

Railway line in Middle Franconia, Germany

Neunkirchen am Sand–Simmelsdorf-Hüttenbach

Overview
- Line number: 5925

Service
- Route number: 891.3

Technical
- Line length: 9.8 km (6.1 mi)
- Track gauge: 1,435 mm (4 ft 8 1/2 in)

The Schnaittach Valley Railway (German: Schnaittachtalbahn) is a single-tracked, branch line in the Bavarian province of Middle Franconia in southern Germany. It branches off at Neunkirchen am Sand from the Nuremberg–Cheb railway and runs from there in a northerly direction through the valley of the Schnaittach to its terminal station at Simmelsdorf-Hüttenbach.

== History ==
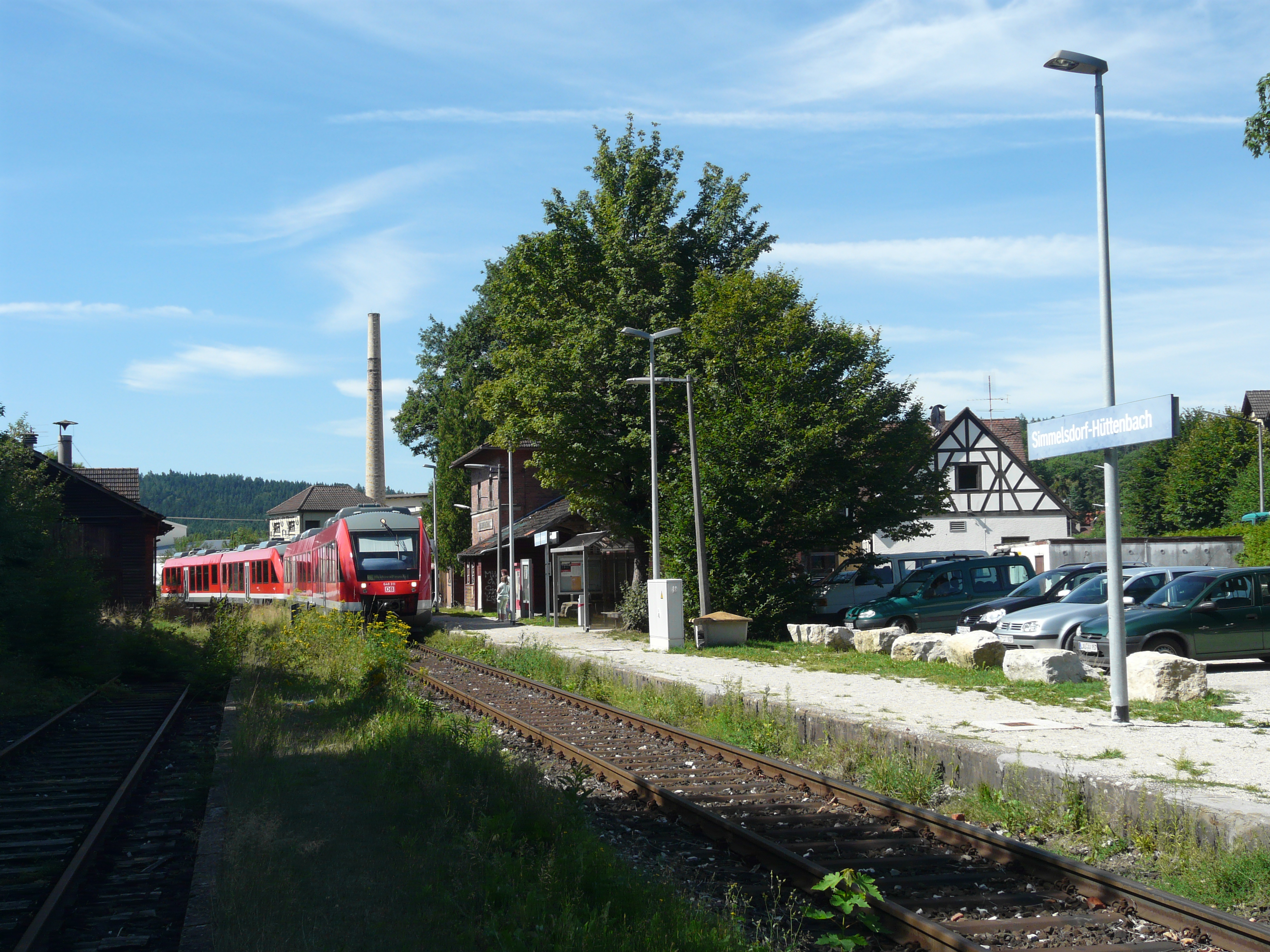
A passenger train arriving at the terminal station of the Schnaittach Valley Railway

The stub line was opened on 5 December 1895, after connexion of Schnaittach to the railway line from Nuremberg to Bayreuth was dropped in favour a route through the Pegnitz Valley. An extension to the village of Betzenstein 12 km away was never established due to disagreements over the course of the line and the outbreak of the First World War. Train crossings took place in the former station of Schnaittach Markt.

Since 27 September 1987 the line has been integrated into the Greater Nuremberg Transport Network (VGN) and has been given a line number of R31.

== Operations ==
Since 15 September 2008 the line has been worked exclusively by Class 648 diesel multiple units these having gradually replaced earlier stock in anticipation of the introduction of DB Regio Mittelfranken's Middle Franconian Railway after the 2008/2009 timetable change. Since 14 December 2008 an hourly services has been implemented; in addition all trains runs through to Nuremberg. Previously Class 614 diesel multiples and operated along with school trains comprising Class 218-hauled Silberling coaches.

== Future ==
With the planned electrification of the Nuremberg Cheb railway there are plans to likewise electrify this branch line and include it into the Nuremberg S-Bahn network.

== Gallery ==
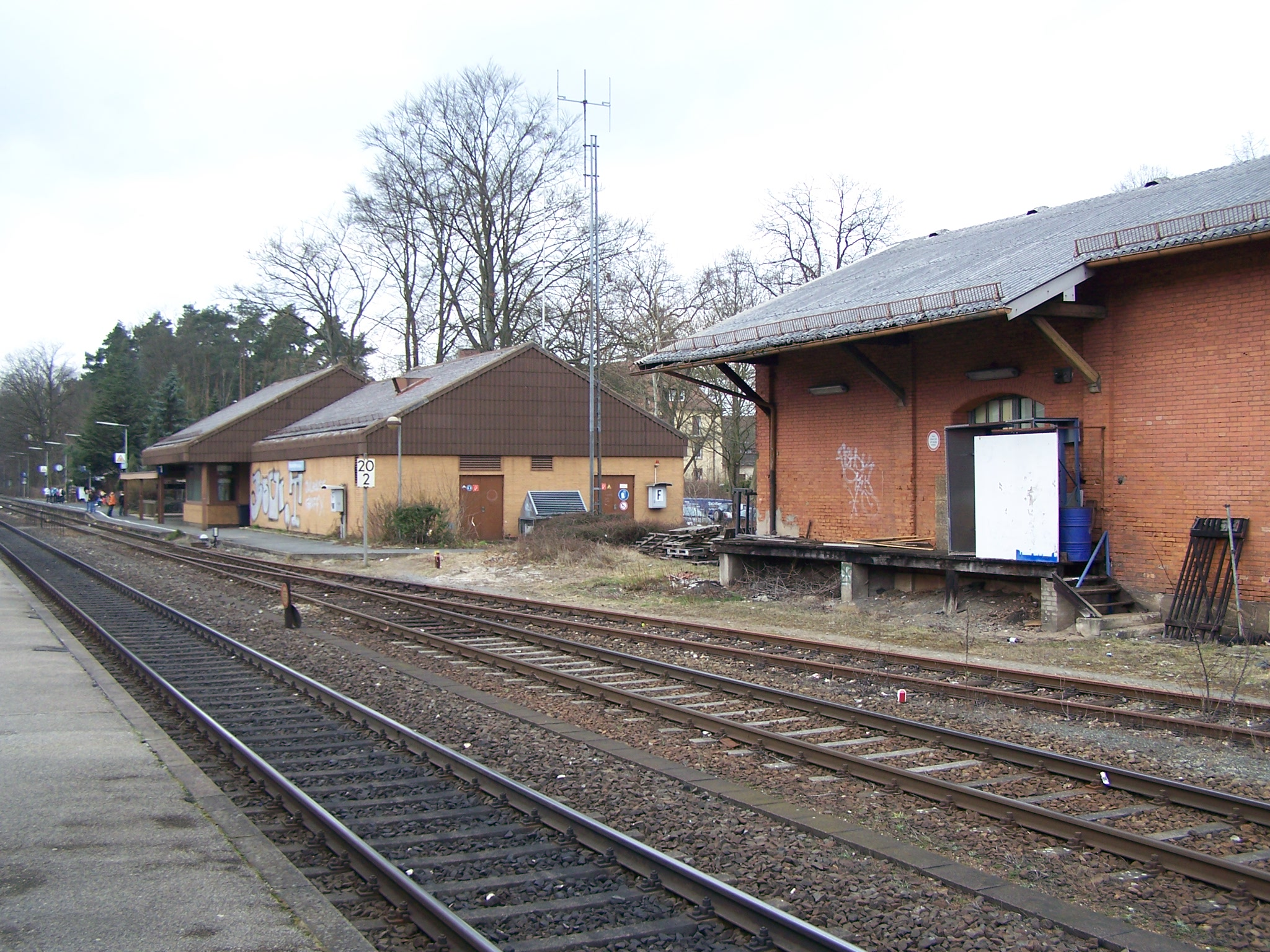
Neunkirchen am Sand station

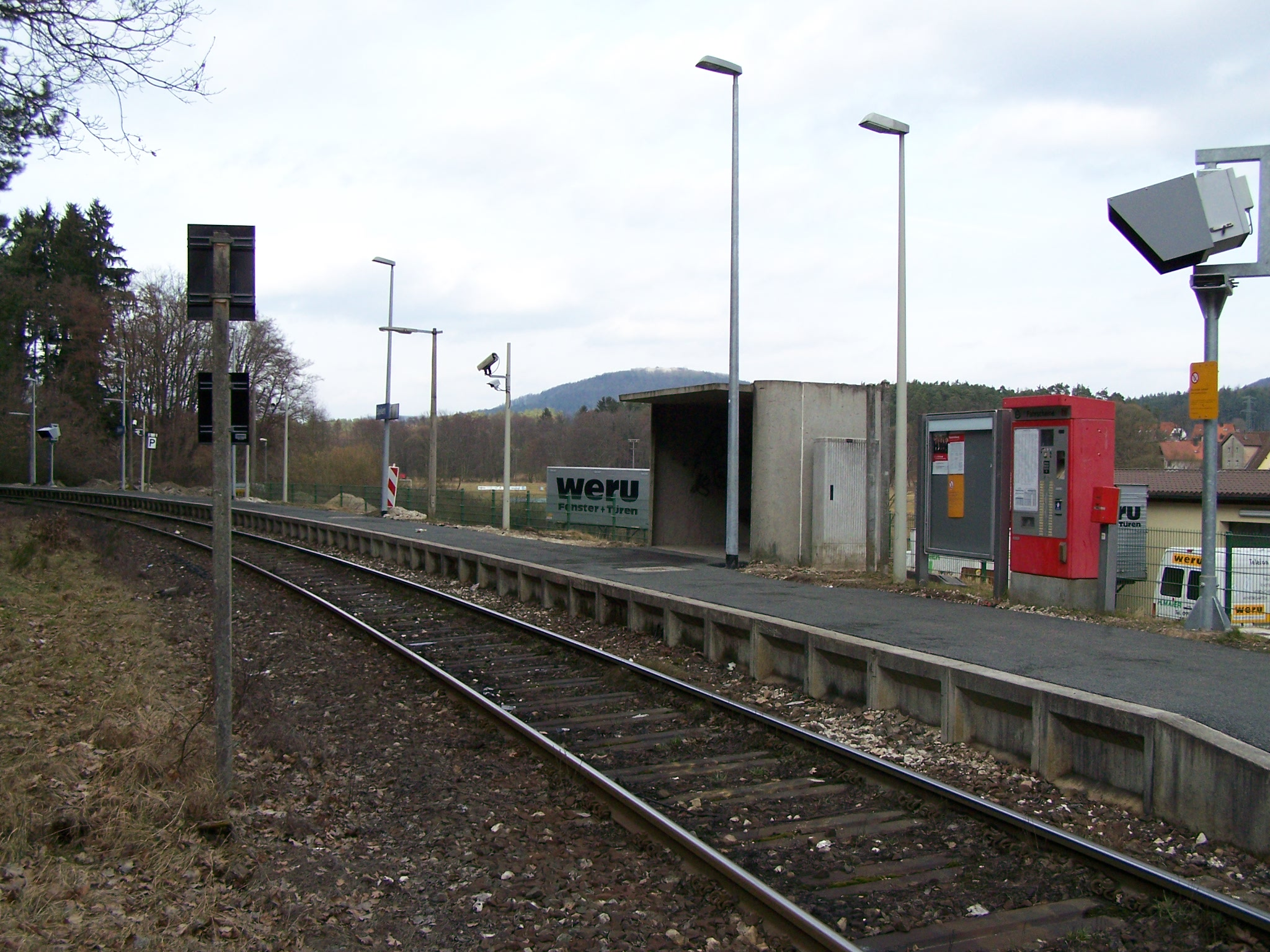
Speikern halt

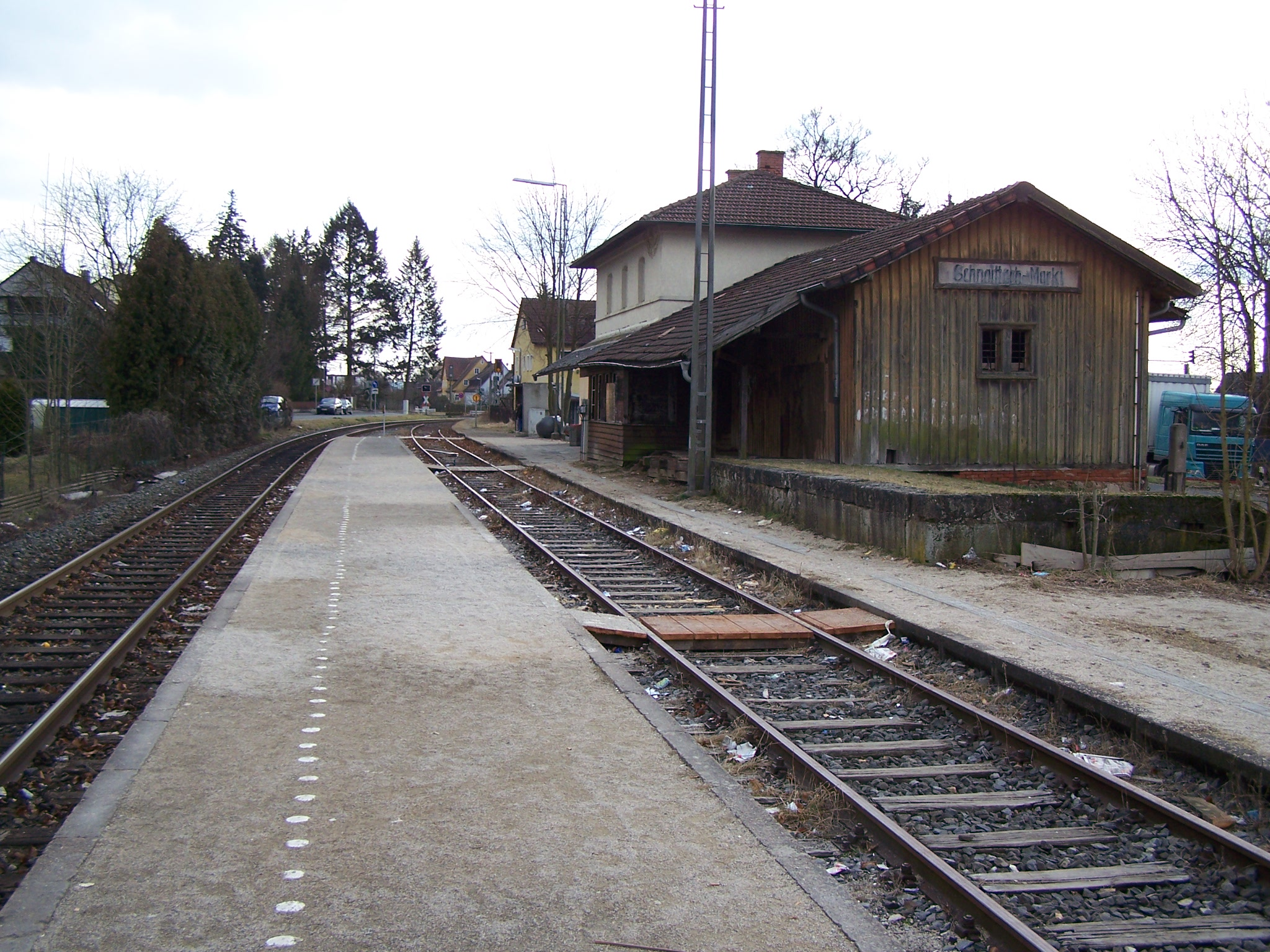
Schnaittach Markt halt

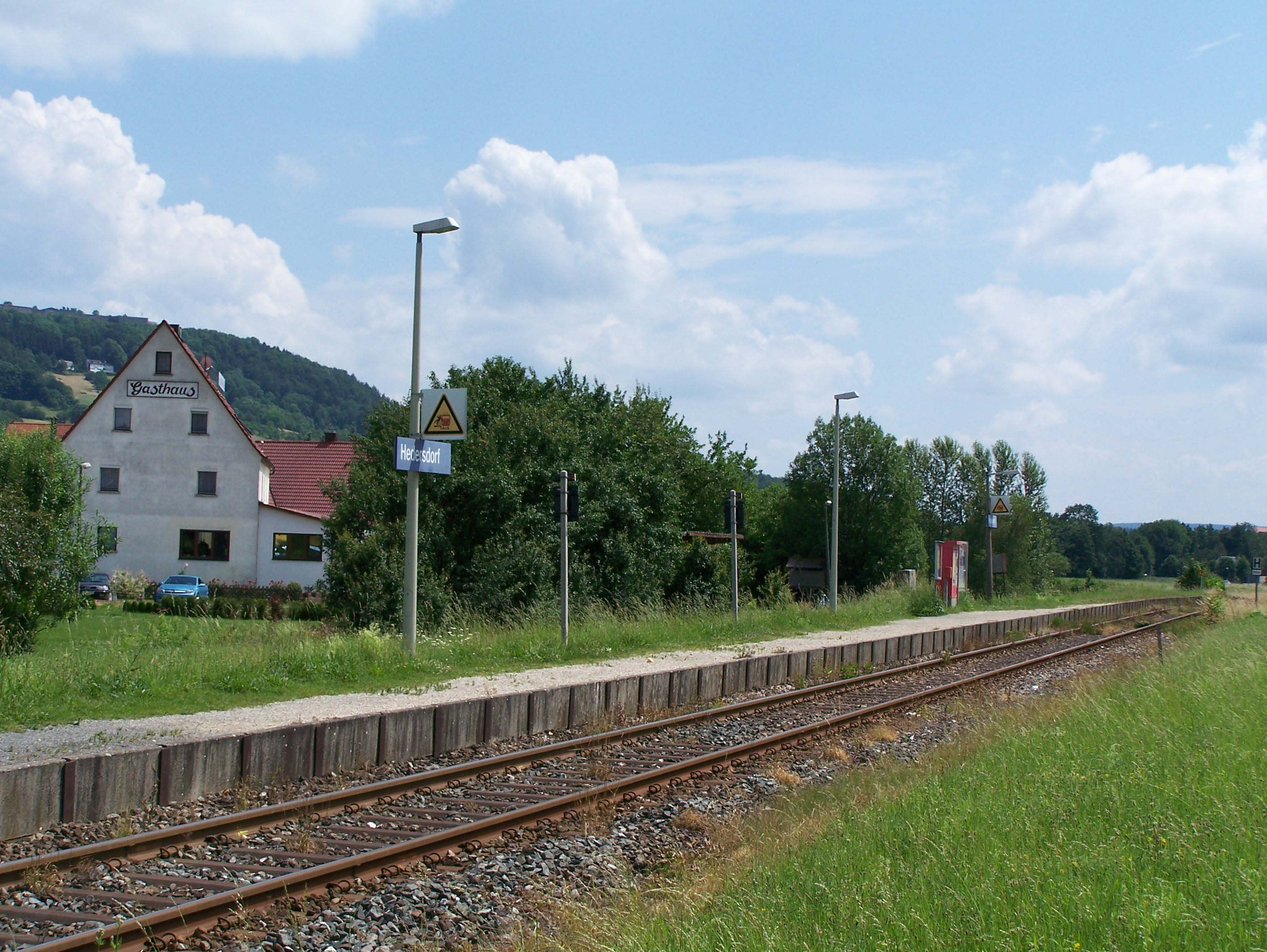
Hedersdorf halt

== See also ==
- Royal Bavarian State Railways
- Bavarian branch lines
