= Saxon-Franconian trunk line =

Railway between the German cities of Dresden and Nuremberg

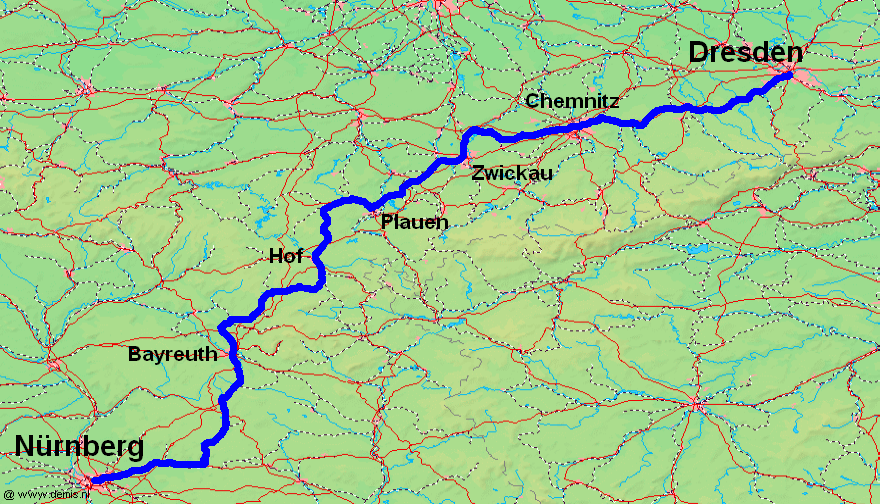
Route

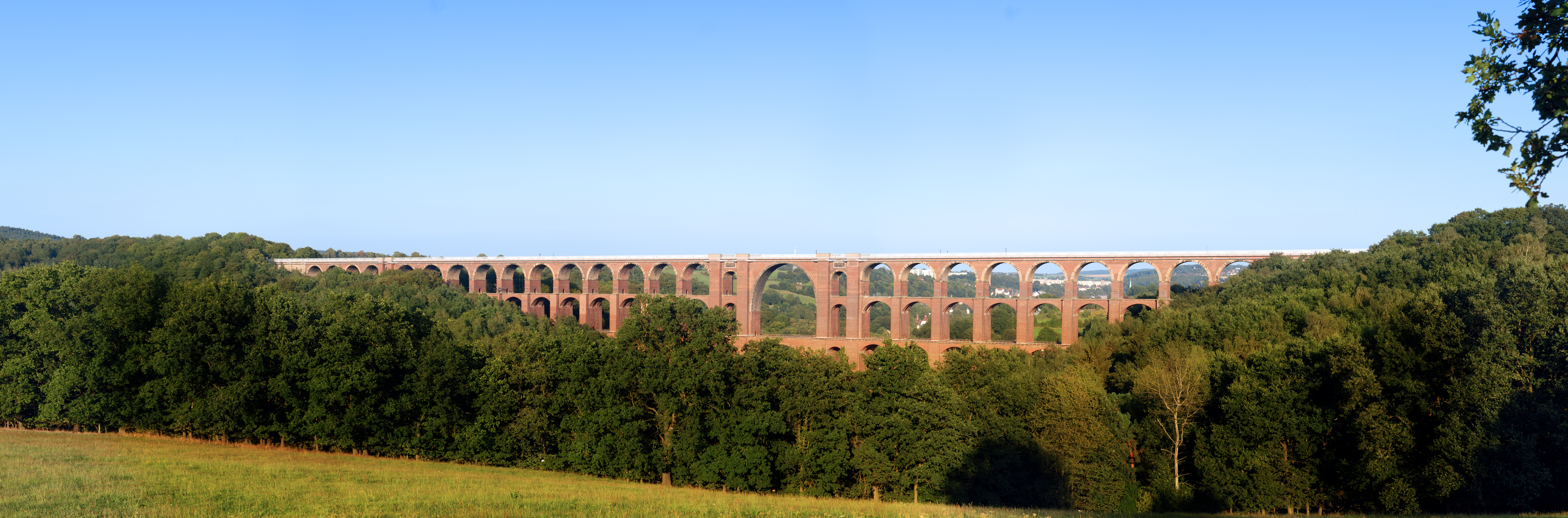
Göltzsch Viaduct

Saxon-Franconian trunk line (German: Sachsen-Franken-Magistrale) is a modern term for a double-track railway route between the German cities of Dresden and Nuremberg. It is 390 kilometres long and currently electrified from Dresden to Hof. The concept of the Saxon-Franconian trunk route was developed in the transport policy debate in the 1990s during consideration of direct rail services connecting Dresden and Görlitz with Karlsruhe and Oberstdorf. The term is not traditionally used in relation to the railway lines now described by it.

== Route ==
The route runs from Dresden to the southwest through the Saxon Uplands, running from Dresden to Zwickau parallel with the Ore Mountains. Between Plauen and Hof it passes through the Vogtland. The route then cuts through the Fichtel Mountains, the Franconian Jura and Franconian Switzerland.

=== Dresden–Hof ===
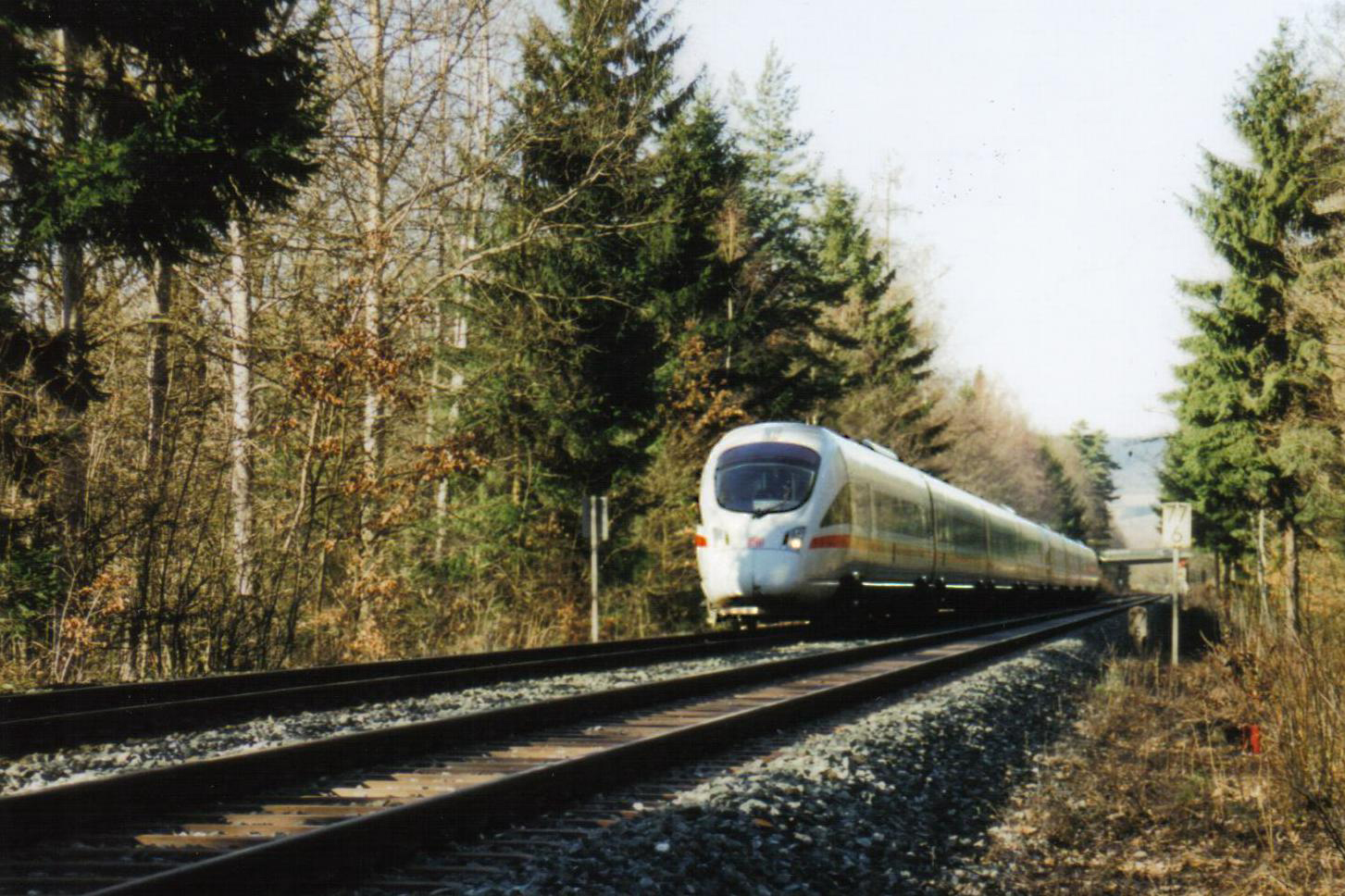
An ICE TD on the Schiefe Ebene

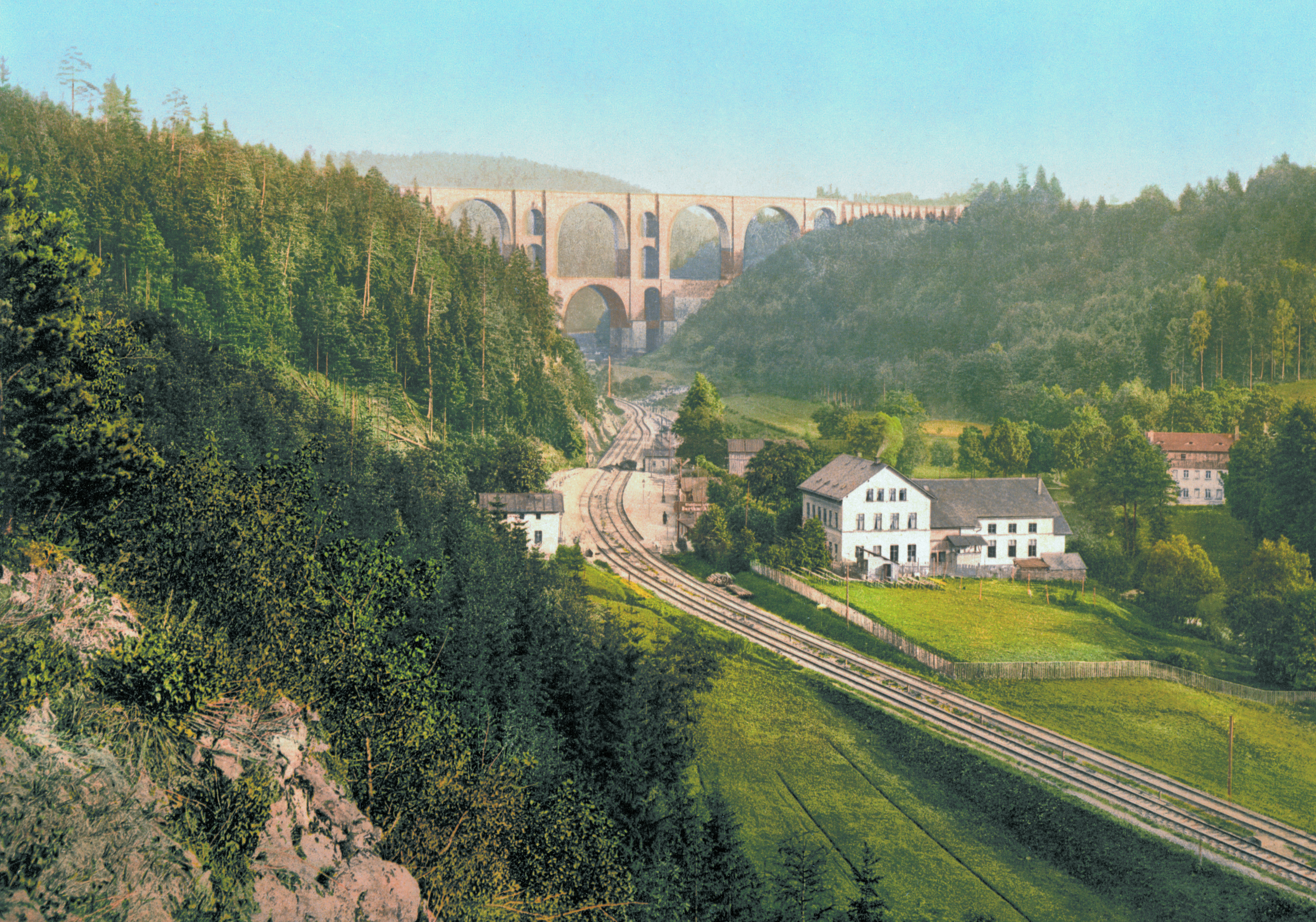
Elster Viaduct in 1900

See:

- Dresden–Werdau railway
- Leipzig–Hof railway

=== Hof–Nuremberg ===
See:

- Weiden–Oberkotzau railway
- Regensburg–Weiden railway
- Bamberg–Hof railway
- Bayreuth–Neuenmarkt-Wirsberg railway
- Schnabelwaid–Bayreuth railway
- Nuremberg–Cheb railway

== History ==
The modern Saxon-Franconian trunk line is formed from several sections. The first section was opened on 6 September 1845 as part of a branch line connecting the Saxon-Bavarian Railway at Werdau rail triangle junction to Zwickau. On 31 May 1846, the route opened from Werdau rail triangle junction to Reichenbach. While the section between Plauen and the Bavarian border was opened on 20 November 1848, the intermediate section from Reichenbach to Plauen was not completed until the completion of the Göltzsch Viaduct on 15 July 1851. On the Bavarian side, the Neuenmarkt–Hof section was opened on 1 November 1848 as part of the Ludwig South-North Railway and it was extended to the border to meet the Saxon-Bavarian railway from Plauen also on 20 November 1848. The line from Neuenmarkt to Bayreuth was opened by the Royal Bavarian State Railways on 28 November 1853. It was the first Bavarian railway line to be built and leased to the state. The section from Bayreuth via Hersbruck to Nuremberg, the Pegnitz Valley Railway, was not opened throughout until 15 July 1877.

On the Saxon side the Albert Railway opened from Dresden to Tharandt on 18 June 1855. The line was opened from Tharandt to Freiberg on 11 of August 1862 after major difficulties were experienced with construction (ramps, tunnels and viaducts) and finances. In 1866, the Chemnitz–Flöha section was opened. In 1869 the last Saxon section of the line was completed from Freiberg to Chemnitz. Although the Pegnitz Valley Railway was not yet completed, the line via Kulmbach and Lichtenfels provided a direct east–west link from Silesia to the south and southwestern parts of the country.

In the following decades, the line was an important rail link for east–west traffic. Even in the years of the division of Europe, the route retained some significance.

After the political changes in East Germany, the route was examined for work that could be carried out quickly to expand trade between southern Germany and Saxony. Shortly after 1990 there was considerable political efforts to upgrade what was now called the Saxon-Franconian trunk line for higher speeds to make it more competitive for rail connections. The first stage of this work was included in the Federal Transport Infrastructure Plan of 1992. The plan provided that by 1998 the line between Hof and Dresden would allow virtually continuous speeds of 160 km/h, reducing the travel time for this section to two and a half hours. On 1 February 1997, the Planungsgesellschaft Deutsche Einheit mbH ("German Unity Planning Company") contracted Deutsche Bahn (DB) to upgrade the line. That same month, upgrading began of the section between Niederbobritzsch and Freiberg. In June work began on the St. Egidien–Glauchau, Reichenbach–Netzschkau and Herlasgrün–Jocketa sections. In 1997 a total length of 24 km of the line was upgraded. The first completed section of the upgrade between Niederbobritzsch and Freiberg was handed over to the DB on 12 December 1997. The total planned cost for the upgrading of the line was estimated at this time to cost Deutsche Mark 2.8 billion (about €1.4 billion). In 1998, DM 280 million was invested and 55 km was completed by late 1998.

The originally planned construction of a long tunnel (the "Vogtland tunnel") between Hof and Plauen has not been realised.

== Operations ==
=== Franken-Sachsen-Express ===
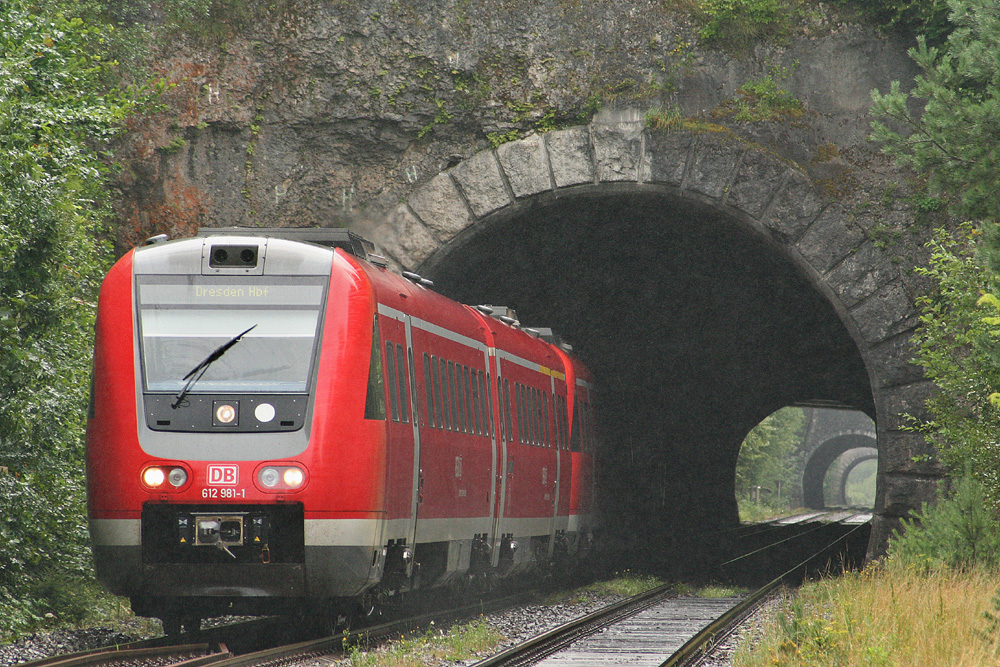
Franken-Sachsen-Express to Dresden near Velden

At the time of the timetable change of December 2006, DB operated four pairs of InterCity trains a day on the line. At the change these were replaced by Interregio-Express (IRE) trains operating as the Franken-Sachsen-Express, running eight times a day each way, which could be used with regional fares. These trains are operated by DB Regio as part of DB's long-distance services, using class 612 tilting trains and reducing the Nuremberg–Dresden travel time by 40 minutes compared to the previous situation.

In the timetable change of December 2007, an hourly service was implemented between Dresden and Nuremberg; these services operate alternately by Marktredwitz and via Bayreuth. According to the 2008/09 timetable, Regional-Express services take 4 hours and 20 minutes to run over the whole line via Marktredwitz. IRE services on the longer route via Bayreuth stop less frequently and therefore take the same total time.

In the first year of operation, 1.4 million passengers used the new rail service. Passengers on the Franken-Sachsen-Express increased by about 20 percent on working days in the first half of 2008 compared to the previous year, and by about 17 percent on weekends.

Since the timetable change on 15 December 2013, all trains run as Regional-Express services. When running via Bayreuth, trains must now be changed in Hof, as electric locomotives are used with bi-level cars between Dresden and Hof. Services via Marktredwitz continue to run as through trains from Dresden to Nuremberg.

=== Development ===
The further development of services is mainly dependent on further upgrades, particularly the upgrading of the track in Chemnitz station, where the maximum train speed is 40 km/h. Studies indicate that a new 10 km-long railway line between Plauen and Hof would significantly reduce travel times.

The electrification of the section between Reichenbach and Nuremberg is the highest priority and would also allow for shorter travel times, as electric vehicles have significant advantages on the steeply graded track. In 2007, DB estimated the total cost of the required upgrade between Nuremberg and Reichenbach, including electrification, would be €460 million.

In March 2007, the federal government announced that funding for electrification between Reichenbach and Hof would be increased from €50 to 126 million. Work in this section began in 2010 and is expected to be completed in 2014. This work is required so that services between Leipzig and Plauen can operate through the new City-Tunnel in Leipzig, where no diesel vehicles will be allowed.

It is unclear when the remaining 170 km of line between Nuremberg and Hof will be electrified. In particular, the section in the upper Pegnitz valley has many engineering structures that would be difficult and expensive to electrify.
