= Simmelsdorf =

- Municipality
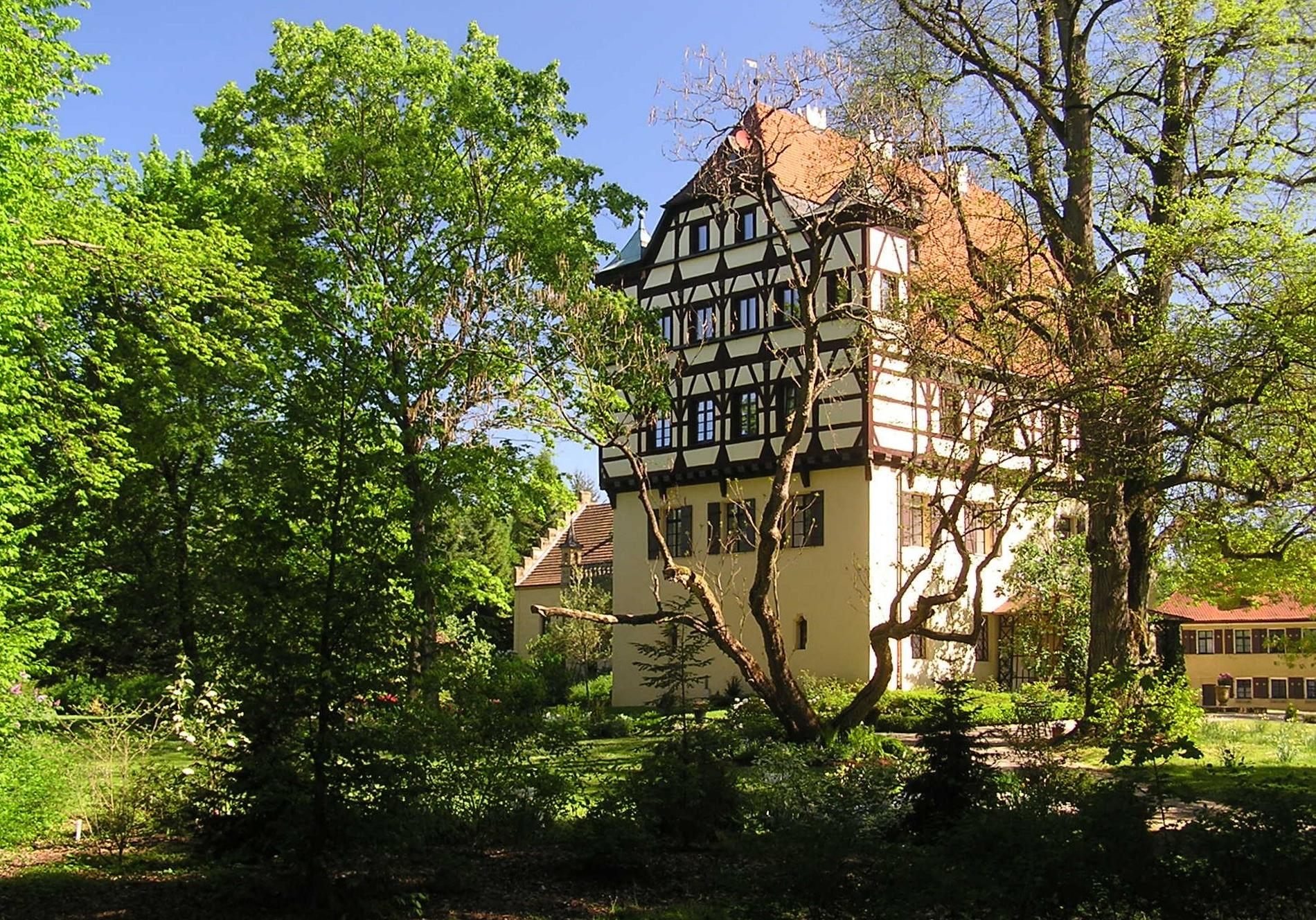
- Tucherschloss in Simmelsdorf

- Coat of arms

- Location of Simmelsdorf within Nürnberger Land district
- Interactive map of Simmelsdorf
- Location within Germany Location within Bavaria
- Coordinates: 49°36′N 11°21′E
- Country: Germany
- State: Bavaria
- Admin. region: Mittelfranken
- District: Nürnberger Land
- Subdivisions: 24 Gemeindeteile

Government
  - Mayor (2020–26): Perry Gumann (FW)

Area
  - Total: 40.87 km^{2} (15.78 sq mi)
- Elevation: 375 m (1,230 ft)

Population (2025-12-31)
  - Total: 3,186
  - Density: 77.95/km^{2} (201.9/sq mi)
- Time zone: UTC+01:00 (CET)
  - Summer (DST): UTC+02:00 (CEST)
- Postal codes: 91245
- Dialling codes: 09155
- Vehicle registration: LAU, ESB, HEB, N, PEG
- Website: www.simmelsdorf.de

Simmelsdorf (German pronunciation: [ˈzɪml̩sdɔʁf]) is a municipality in the district of Nürnberger Land in Bavaria in Germany.

== History ==
Famous is the House of Tucher von Simmelsdorf, originating from this place.
