= DBAG Class 612 =

Deutsche Bahn diesel multiple unit

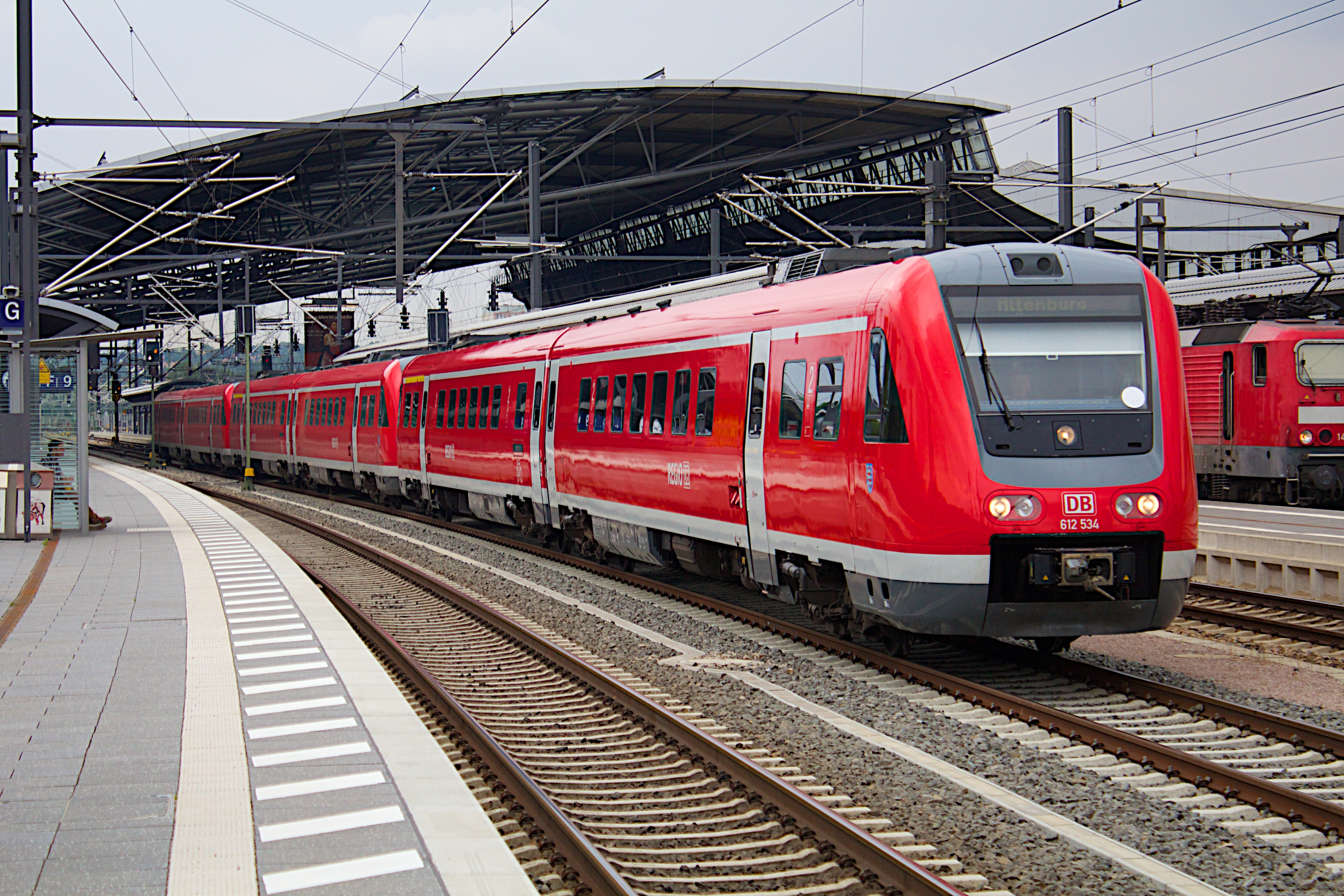
- Class 612 534
- Stock type: Diesel-hydraulic multiple unit
- Manufacturer: Adtranz/Bombardier
- Built at: Hennigsdorf, Oberhavel, Brandenburg
- Constructed: 1998–2003
- Number built: 192 trainsets

Specifications
- Train length: 51.75 m (169 ft 9 3/8 in)
- Maximum speed: 160 km/h (99 mph)
- Weight: Service: 119 t (117 long tons; 131 short tons)
- Prime mover: Cummins QSK19
- Cylinder count: 6
- Power output: 2 × 563 kW (755 hp)
- UIC classification: 2′B′+B′2′
- Track gauge: 1,435 mm (4 ft 8 1/2 in) standard gauge

The DBAG Class 612 is a 2-car tilting diesel multiple unit operated by the Deutsche Bahn for fast regional rail services on unelectrified lines.

== General information ==
The Class are a two car tilting DMU built between 1998 and 2003 by Adtranz, which Bombardier Transportation later acquired, in Hennigsdorf. The class are also known as RegioSwingers.

They were developed to replace the problematic DB Class 611. The sets worked fine between 1998 and 2004 until cracks were detected in a number of wheelsets and so the tilting system was disabled and curves on lines had to have reduced speed limits, which affected the timetables and connections. From 2005 the trains had the wheelsets replaced and the tilting system was back up and running. The maximum tilt is 8°.

After ICE TD class 605 was grounded due to a fracture of an axle in one unit, it was replaced by class 612 on the Dresden-Munich line 2003, as replacement by anything other than a tilting DMU would have meant an extension of travel time. Even though class 612 was not constructed for ICE-type travelling comfort, 16 units were repainted in the ICE paint scheme and renumbered as class 612.4.

The RegioSwinger design is also used by Croatian Railways as class HŽ 7123.

== Liveries ==
Most units are in the standard Verkehrsrot Red livery. In 2003 17 units were painted in the IC scheme of White with a red band, however, these are now back in all red.

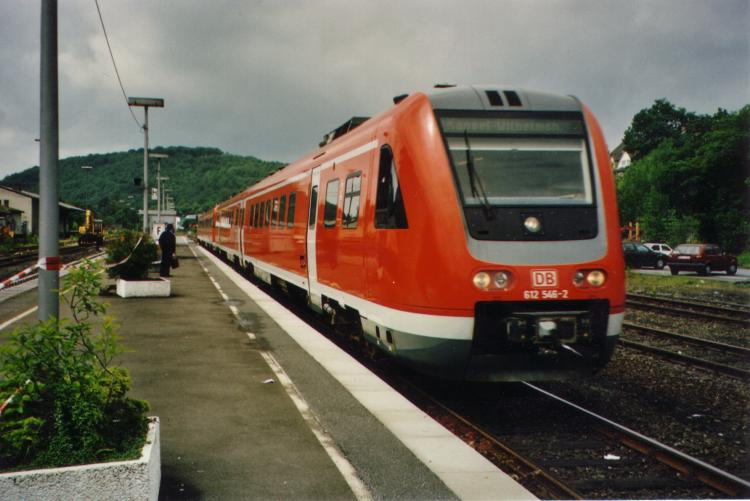
612 in red livery

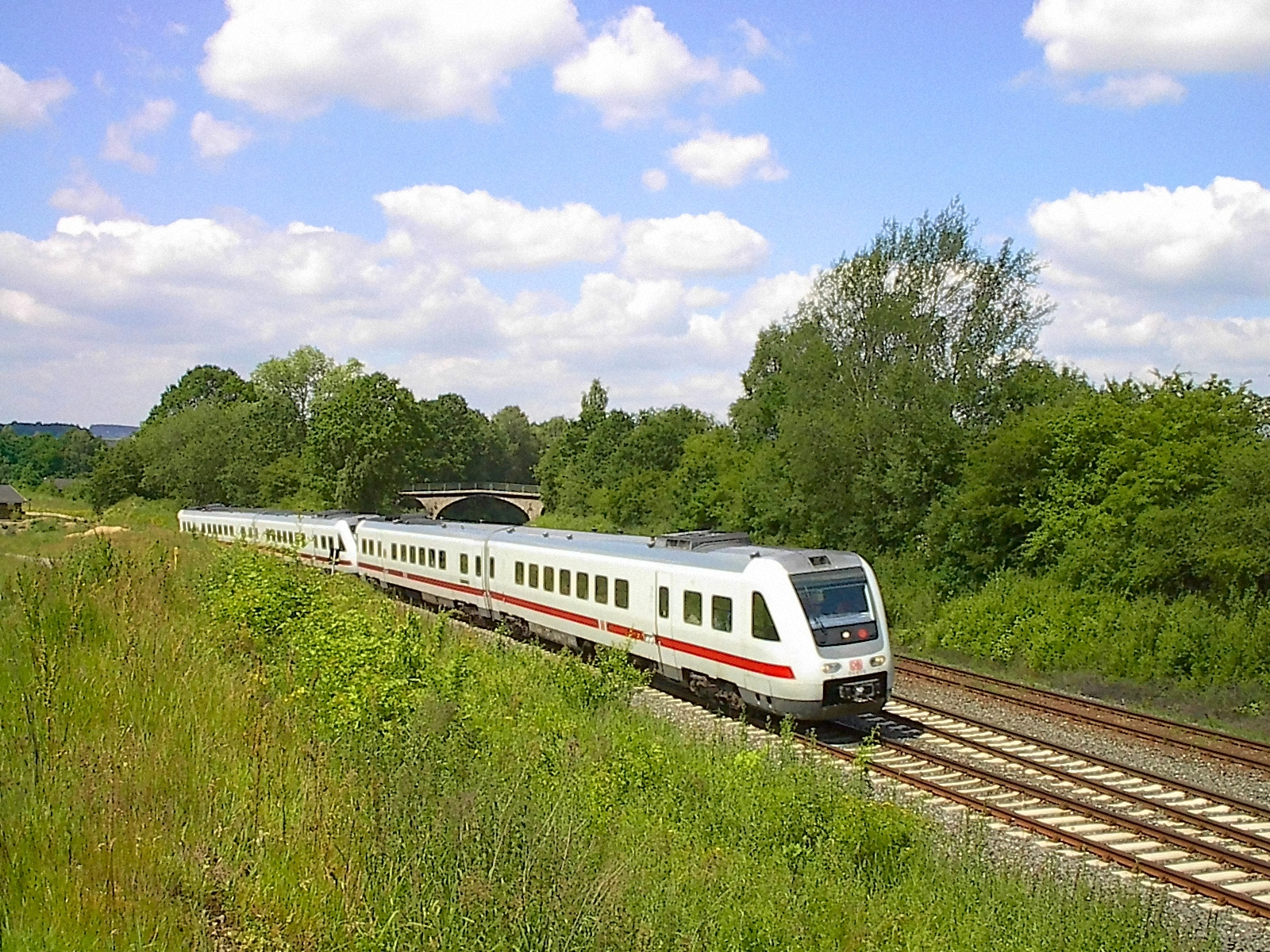
612 in IC livery

After 2017, trains using the yellow/white/black branding of bwegt, the mobility brand of the Baden-Württemberg State Ministry for Transport have been operating out of Ulm.

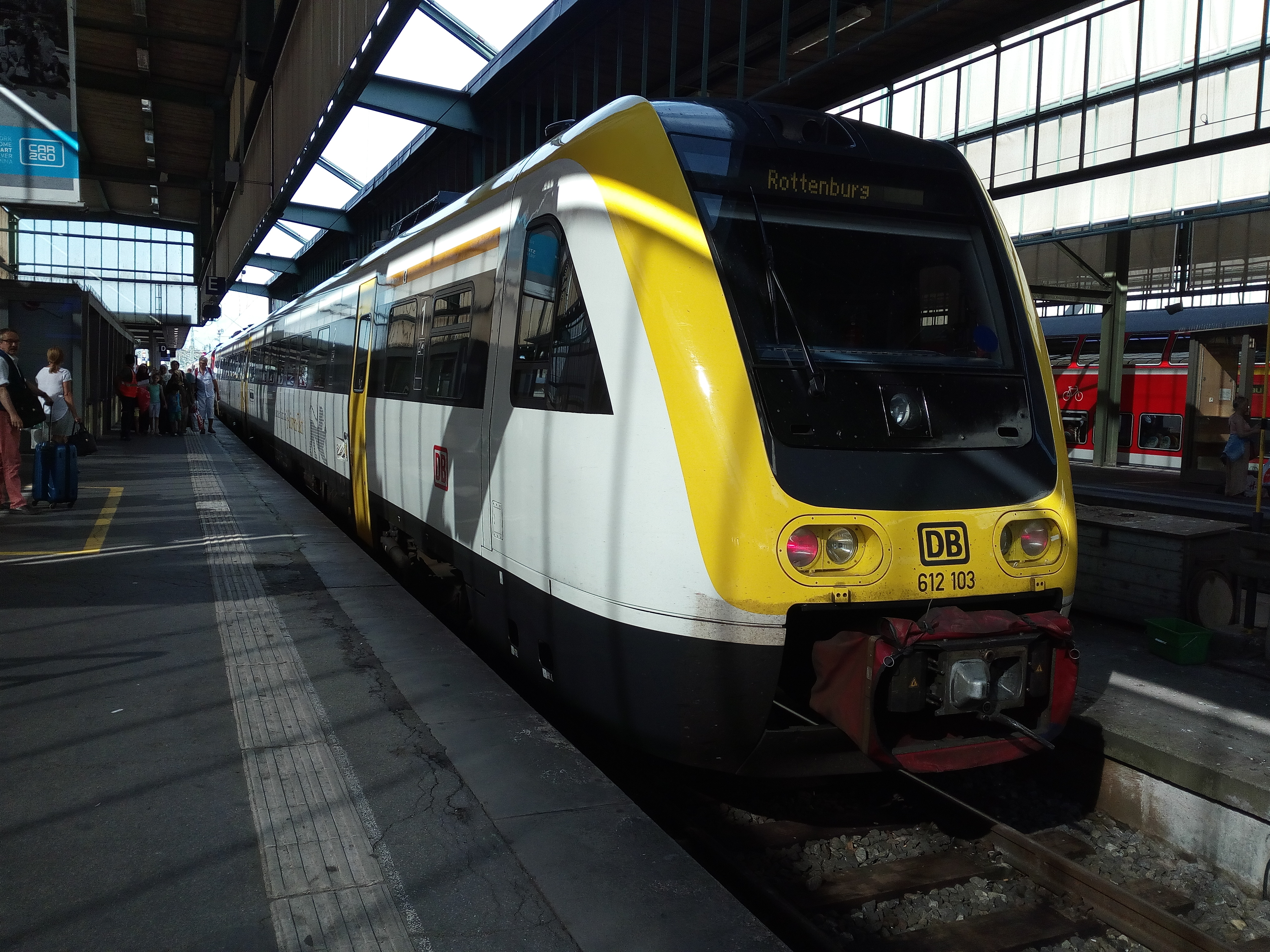
612 103 in the livery of bwegt in Stuttgart Hauptbahnhof

== Services ==
Class 612 are used on the following services in the different regions (2012):

=== DB Regio Bayern ===
- IRE 1 Nürnberg - Bayreuth - Hof - Plauen - Zwickau - Chemnitz – Dresden
- RE Hof/Bayreuth – Lichtenfels – Saalfeld
- RE Hof – Bamberg
- RE Hof – Würzburg
- RE Hof – Nürnberg
- RB Lichtenfels – Kronach
- RE Regensburg – Schwandorf – Weiden – Marktredwitz – Hof
- RE Würzburg – Bamberg – Hof/Bayreuth
- RE Nürnberg – Schwandorf/Weiden
- RB Würzburg – Schweinfurt – Ebenhausen – Bad Kissingen
- RE Nürnberg – Donauwörth – Augsburg – Buchloe – Kempten – Immenstadt – Lindau/Oberstdorf (called "Allgäu-Franken-Express")
- RE Lindau – Immenstadt – Kempten – Memmingen – Ulm
- RE Oberstdorf – Immenstadt – Kempten – Memmingen – Ulm
- RE Lindau - Kempten - Augsburg

=== DB Regio Nordrhein-Westfalen ===
- RE 17 Hagen – Schwerte (Ruhr) – Fröndenberg – Arnsberg (Westf) – Meschede – Bestwig – Brilon-Wald – Marsberg – Warburg (Westf) – Hofgeismar – Grebenstein – Kassel Hbf – Kassel-Wilhelmshöhe

=== DB Regio Rhein Neckar ===
- RE 4 Karlsruhe – Graben-Neudorf – Germersheim – Speyer – Ludwigshafen – Worms – Mainz

=== DB Regio Südwest ===
- RE 3 Frankfurt (Main) Hbf – Mainz – Bad Kreuznach – Kirn – Idar-Oberstein – Türkismühle – Saarbrücken
- RE 11 Saarbrücken - Saarlouis - Merzig - Trier
- RE 12 Trier – Bitburg – Gerolstein – Kall – Euskirchen – Köln
- RE 25 Koblenz Hbf – Limburg (Lahn) – Wetzlar – Gießen
- IRE Stuttgart Hbf — Tübingen Hbf — Sigmaringen( — Aulendorf)/ — Rottenburg( — Horb)(Stuttgart Hbf — Tübingen Hbf only calling at Reutlingen Hbf)

=== DB Regio Südost ===
- RE 4 Hannover Hbf – Hildesheim – Goslar – Bad Harzburg – Halberstadt – Halle (Saale) (– Leipzig)
- RE 6 Leipzig – Chemnitz
- RE 16 Leipzig – Altenburg – Reichenbach (V.) – Hof/Adorf
- RE 1 Dresden – Bischofswerda – Görlitz
- RE 2 Dresden – Bischofswerda – Zittau – Liberec – Tanvald
- RE 3 Nürnberg – Marktredwitz – Hof – Zwickau – Chemnitz – Dresden
- RE 1 Göttingen – Gotha – Erfurt – Gera – Gößnitz – Zwickau/Chemnitz
- RE 3 Erfurt – Gera – Altenburg
- RE 14 Erfurt – Meiningen
- RE 7 Würzburg – Suhl – Erfurt

== Citations ==
- Garvin, Brian (2013). German Railways: The Complete Guide to All Locomotives and Multiple Units of Deutsche Bahn. Vol. 1. Sheffield, UK: Platform 5 Publishing. ISBN 978-1-9094-3103-4.
- Garvin, Brian (2015). German Railways: The Complete Guide to All Locomotives and Multiple Units of Deutsche Bahn. Vol. 2. Sheffield, UK: Platform 5 Publishing. ISBN 978-1-9094-3118-8.
- Erpenbeck, Dr. T.; Büttner, A.; Voges, Dr. V. (2006). "Tilting train technology at Deustsche Bahn AG - Prophecies, reality and necessary innovations" (PDF). UIC. Archived from the original (PDF) on 2016-02-19.
