= Speichersdorf =

- Municipality
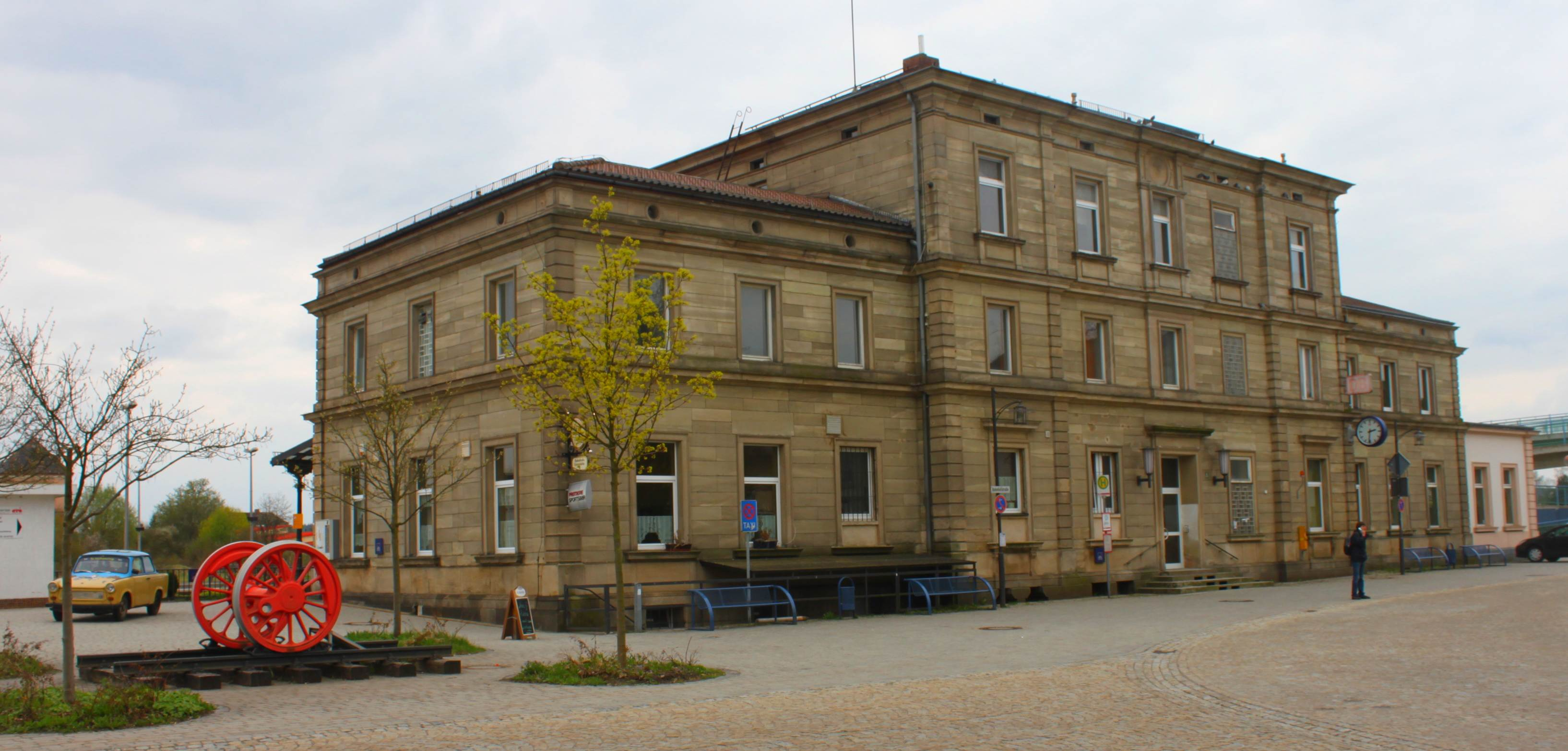
- Train station in Speichersdorf

- Coat of arms

- Location of Speichersdorf within Bayreuth district
- Interactive map of Speichersdorf
- Location within Germany Location within Bavaria
- Coordinates: 49°52′N 11°46′E
- Country: Germany
- State: Bavaria
- Admin. region: Oberfranken
- District: Bayreuth

Government
  - Mayor (2020–26): Christian Porsch

Area
  - Total: 52.89 km^{2} (20.42 sq mi)
- Elevation: 460 m (1,510 ft)

Population (2025-12-31)
  - Total: 5,901
  - Density: 111.6/km^{2} (289.0/sq mi)
- Time zone: UTC+01:00 (CET)
  - Summer (DST): UTC+02:00 (CEST)
- Postal codes: 95469
- Dialling codes: 09275
- Vehicle registration: BT
- Website: www.speichersdorf.de

Speichersdorf is a municipality in the district of Bayreuth in Upper Franconia in Bavaria, Germany. It is situated near the Fichtel Mountains, 18 km east of Bayreuth. It has a population of about 6,200.
