= Bayreuth–Neuenmarkt-Wirsberg railway =

Railway line in Germany

Bayreuth–Neuenmarkt-Wirsberg
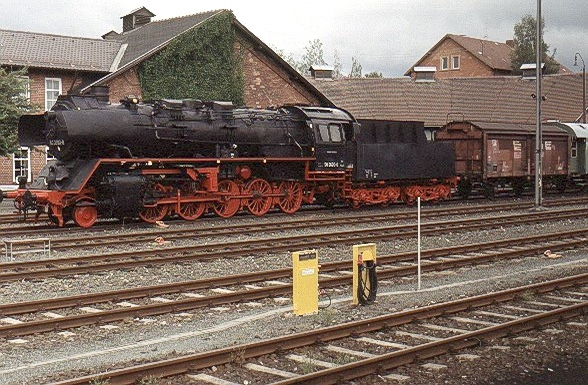

Overview
- Line number: 5051
- Locale: Bavaria, Germany

Service
- Route number: 850

Technical
- Line length: 21.0 km (13.0 mi)
- Track gauge: 1,435 mm (4 ft 8 1/2 in) standard gauge
Route map
- Source: German railway atlas

The Bayreuth–Neuenmarkt-Wirsberg line is a single-track main line railway in the German state of Bavaria. It is an important section of the so-called Saxon-Franconian trunk line from Dresden to Nuremberg. The line was opened in 1853 and is one of the oldest railways in Germany.

== History ==
It was the first Bavarian railway line to be built and leased to the state. That is, it was financed by the city of Bayreuth and the line was built and subsequently leased by the Bavarian government. The route from Neuenmarkt to Bayreuth was opened on 28 November 1853 by the Royal Bavarian State Railways as one of the first branch lines of the Ludwig South-North Railway. In 1905 the line was nationalised.

== Operations ==
The line connects with the Bamberg–Hof line in Neuenmarkt-Wirsberg, leading to Bamberg and Hof. Services are operated approximately hourly between Bayreuth and Bamberg by agilis.

In the past trains from Bayreuth had to change direction in Neuenmarkt-Wirsberg to continue up the famous Schiefe Ebene (German: inclined plane) to Hof. The opening of the Schlömen curve in 2001, which allows Neuenmarkt-Wirsberg to be bypassed to the east, improved the connectivity of the line to the northeast considerably. As a result, even some long-distance trains (ICE TD) on the Nuremberg–Dresden route now use the line. December 2006 to December 2013, services of the Franken-Sachsen-Express ran on the line at 2-hour intervals, after a period when no trains used the Schloemen curve at all. A Regional-Express service has run every two hours on the Nuremberg–Bayreuth–Hof route since 15 December 2013.
