= Hof Hauptbahnhof =

Railway station in Hof, Germany

Hof Hbf
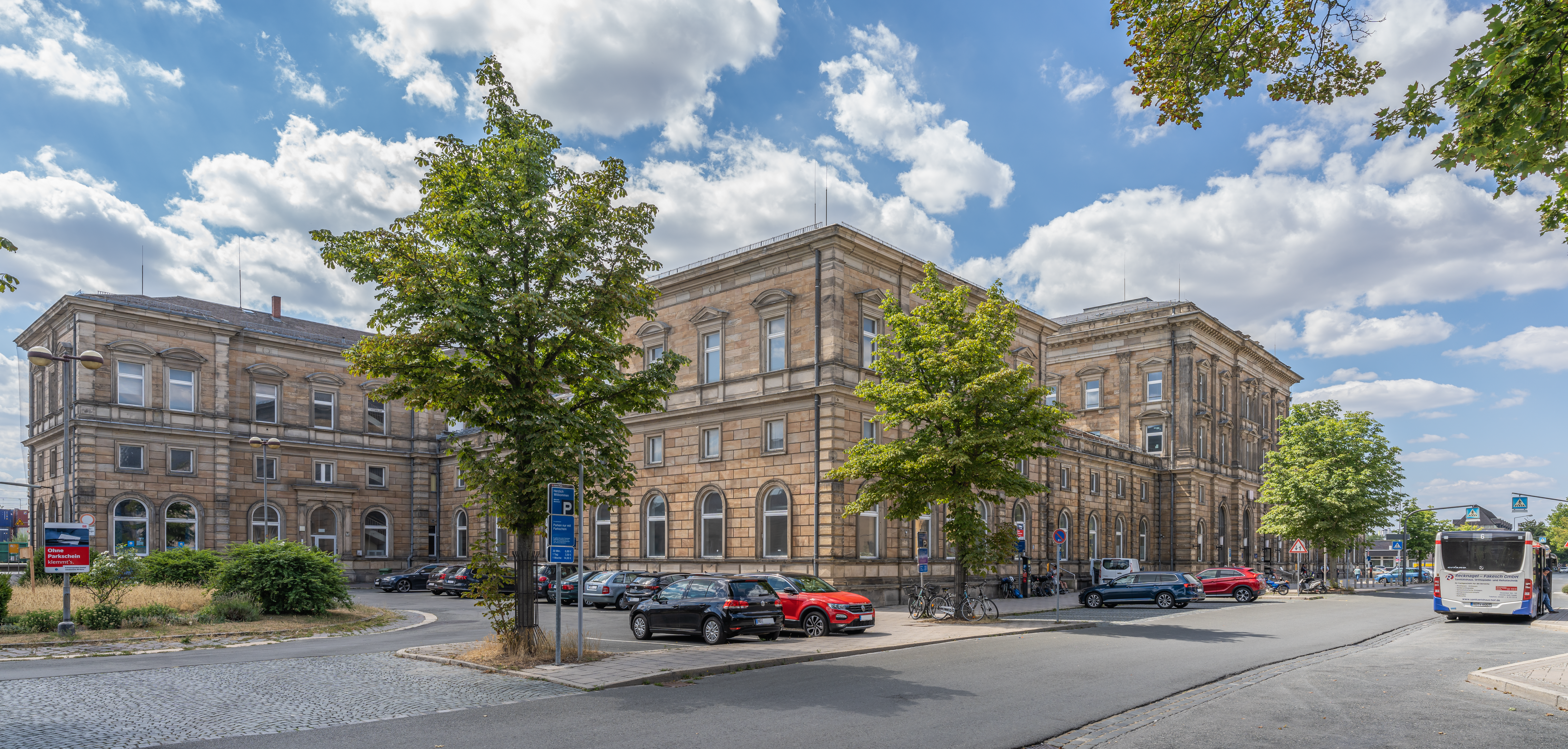
- station building

General information
- Location: Hof (Saale), Bavaria; Germany
- Coordinates: 50°18′29″N 11°55′24″E
- Owner: Deutsche Bahn
- Operator: DB Netz; DB Station&Service
- Lines: Leipzig–Hof (KBS 510, 512, 530, 546); Bamberg–Hof (KBS 512, 850); Regensburg–Hof (KBS 512, 855, 858); Hof–Bad Steben (KBS 857)
- Platforms: 5 through platforms; 2 bay platforms

Construction
- Architect: Georg Friedrich Seidel
- Architectural style: Neorenaissance

Other information
- Station code: 2818
- DS100 code: NHO
- IBNR: 8002924
- Category: 3
- Website: www.bahnhof.de; stationsdatenbank-bayern-takt.de

History
- Opened: (1848) / 1880
- Electrified: 15 April 1939; 87 years ago

Services
Preceding station		Following station
Hof-Neuhof Terminus	RB 95	Oberkotzau towards Marktredwitz
Feilitzsch towards Gutenfürst	RB 95	Oberkotzau towards Marktredwitz
Hof-Neuhof Terminus	RB 96	Oberkotzau towards Selb Stadt
Hof-Neuhof towards Bad Steben	RB 97	Oberkotzau towards Bayreuth Hbf
Oberkotzau towards Helmbrechts	RB 98	Terminus
Oberkotzau towards Neuenmarkt-Wirsberg	RB 99	Hof-Neuhof Terminus
Preceding station		Following station
Marktredwitz towards München Hbf	RE 23	Terminus
Preceding station	DB Regio Bayern	Following station
Marktredwitz towards München Hbf	RE 2	Terminus
Münchberg towards Nürnberg Hbf	RE 30	Terminus
Oberkotzau towards Nürnberg Hbf	RE 31	Terminus
Schwarzenbach (Saale) towards Bamberg	RE 35	Terminus
Preceding station		Following station
Terminus	RB 13	Feilitzsch towards Leipzig Hbf
Preceding station	Mitteldeutsche Regiobahn	Following station
Terminus	RE 3	Plauen (Vogtl) ob Bf towards Dresden Hbf
Preceding station	Vogtlandbahn	Following station
Terminus	RB 2	Feilitzsch towards Zwickau Zentrum
Location
- Location within Bavaria Location within Germany Location within Europe

Hof Hauptbahnhof (German for Hof main station; sometimes translated as "Hof Central Station" or described as "Hof central station" in English) is the main railway station in Hof in southern Germany and is situated at the intersection of the Saxon-Franconian trunk line (Magistrale) and the Munich–Regensburg–Leipzig–Berlin line. When it was opened it formed the boundary between the former Bavarian Ludwig South-North Railway Lindau–Hof to the Saxon-Bavarian Railway on the Saxon side from Hof–Leipzig.

Today the Deutsche Bahn has classified Hof Hauptbahnhof as category 3 – a regional hub/long-distance stop.

== Lines and services ==
The Regensburg–Hof, Bamberg–Hof and Leipzig–Hof main lines all meet at Hof Hauptbahnhof, as does the Hof–Bad Steben branch line.

Line	Route	Frequency	Operator
RE 2	Hof – Marktredwitz – Weiden (Oberpf) – Schwandorf – Regensburg – Landshut – Freising – München	120 min	DB Regio Bayern
RE 3	Hof – Plauen – Zwickau – Chemnitz – Freiberg – Dresden	60 min	Mitteldeutsche Regiobahn
RE 23	Hof – Marktredwitz – Weiden (Oberpf) – Schwandorf – Regensburg – Landshut – Freising – München	One train pair	alex
RE 30	Hof – Bayreuth – Pegnitz – Nürnberg	120 min	DB Regio Bayern
RE 31	Hof – Marktredwitz – Pegnitz – Nürnberg	120 min	DB Regio Bayern
RE 35	Hof – Neuenmarkt-Wirsberg – Kulmbach – Lichtenfels – Bamberg	120 min	DB Regio Bayern
RB 2	Hof – Schöneberg – Plauen – Reichenbach – Zwickau – Zwickau Zentrum	2 train pairs	Vogtlandbahn
RB 13	Hof – Schönberg – Weida – Gera – Crossen – Profen – Pegau – Leipzig	120 min	Erfurter Bahn
RB 95	(Hof-Neuhof/Güterfürst–) Hof – Schönwald – Cheb – Schirnding – Marktredwitz	120 min	agilis
RB 96	Hof-Neuhof – Hof – Schönwald – Erkersreuth – Selb Stadt	60 min	agilis
RB 97	Bad Steben – Hof – Marktredwitz – Kirchenlaibach – Bayreuth	60 min	agilis
RB 98	Hof – Münchberg – Helmbrechts	120 min	agilis
RB 99	Hof-Neuhof – Hof – Münchberg – Neuenmarkt-Wirsberg	120 min	agilis

== History ==
After the old Hof station north of the city centre was no longer able to handle the growth in traffic, the Bavarian and Saxon railway administrations built a common, large-scale, through station between 1874 and 1880 west of the city, which was both the boundary and border station between the Royal Bavarian State Railways (K.Bay.Sts.B.) and the Royal Saxon State Railways (K.Sächs.Sts.E.B.). The new Hauptbahnhof was connected to the city centre through the new Hof tramway system, which appeared in 1901. Today buses have replaced the trams. The station comprised two halves, each of which had all the necessary operating facilities (locomotive shed, coal bunkers, locomotive depot (Betriebswerk), storage sidings, etc.). The southern side belonged to the Royal Bavarian State Railways; the northern half to the Royal Saxon State Railways.

The station building was designed in 1856 by the architect, Georg Friedrich Seidel (1823–1895), for the Royal Bavarian State Railways and was, like the entire station, laid out perfectly symmetrically. The border between the two railway administrations ran exactly through the middle of the station building, along the axis of symmetry. In this building there was a magnificent royal waiting room (Königssaal).

The symmetry of the station was given up on the founding of the Deutsche Reichsbahn. The superfluous and duplicated buildings were knocked down over time or used for other purposes. Above the entrance on the station forecourt and in the main hall on the track side the royal coats of arms of Bavaria and Saxony are still to be found today. The royal waiting room has been fully preserved and restored. It belongs today to the station restaurant and is used for events and festivals.

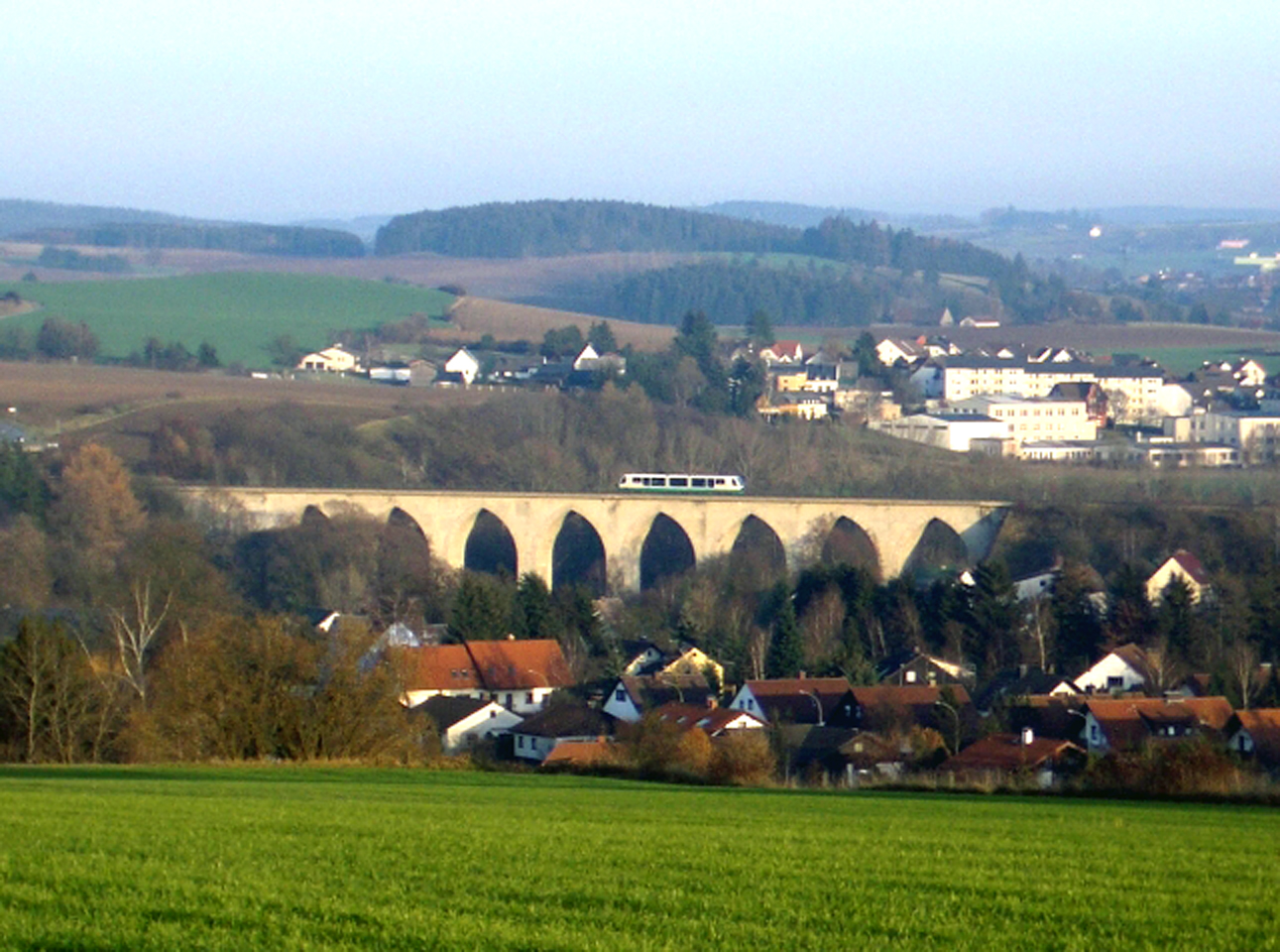
Unterkotzau bridge

Semaphore signals could still be seen in Hof Hauptbahnhof until 1974. On 22 September 1974 a new signal box went into service next to the station building. It was equipped with a modern relay interlocking system of the Siemens Sp Dr S 60 type with 2 train dispatchers (Fahrdienstleiter - Fdl Nord and Fdl Süd) and colour light signals. The signalling installations controlled from Hof include the Hauptbahnhof itself and the adjoining routes to Feilitzsch, Oberkotzau and Hof-Neuhof, as well as the stations of Hof-Neuhof and Oberkotzau (the latter only at night). The old signal box was largely knocked down. The old 'Signal Box 8' at the northern station approach (by the Kuhbogen bridge) is today the home of the Hof Model Railway Club (Modelleisenbahnhclubs MEC Hof).

Hof Hauptbahnhof is located between two bridges over the river Saale. To the south the Moschendorf bridge crosses the river between Oberkotzau and Hof in the district of Moschendorf; to the north the line switches from one side of the river to the other in the district of Unterkotzau at the Unterkotzau bridge between Hof and Feilitzsch.

== Importance within German rail transport ==
The importance of Hof Hauptbahnhof to the German railway system has varied significantly during its history.

=== To 1945 ===
During the state railway (Länderbahn) era, Hof was the intersection of the Bavarian and Saxon state railways, as mentioned above, which required frequent locomotive changes at Hof with the corresponding cost in staff and materiel as well as two separate groups of operating facilities.

On the formation of the Deutsche Reichsbahn this expense became unnecessary. During that time, however, Hof became an important hub within the railway network between Dresden, Leipzig, Nuremberg, Bamberg, Regensburg and Plzeň and for regional traffic. This was due to the fact that several main lines converged here: the lines to Bamberg (Ludwig South-North Railway or Bamberg–Hof railway), Marktredwitz (Weiden–Oberkotzau railway), Plauen (Saxon-Bavarian Railway) and Cheb (Cheb–Oberkotzau railway–Hof) as well as branches into the surrounding area. During that period long-distance trains called regularly at Hof.

=== Passenger traffic since 1945 ===
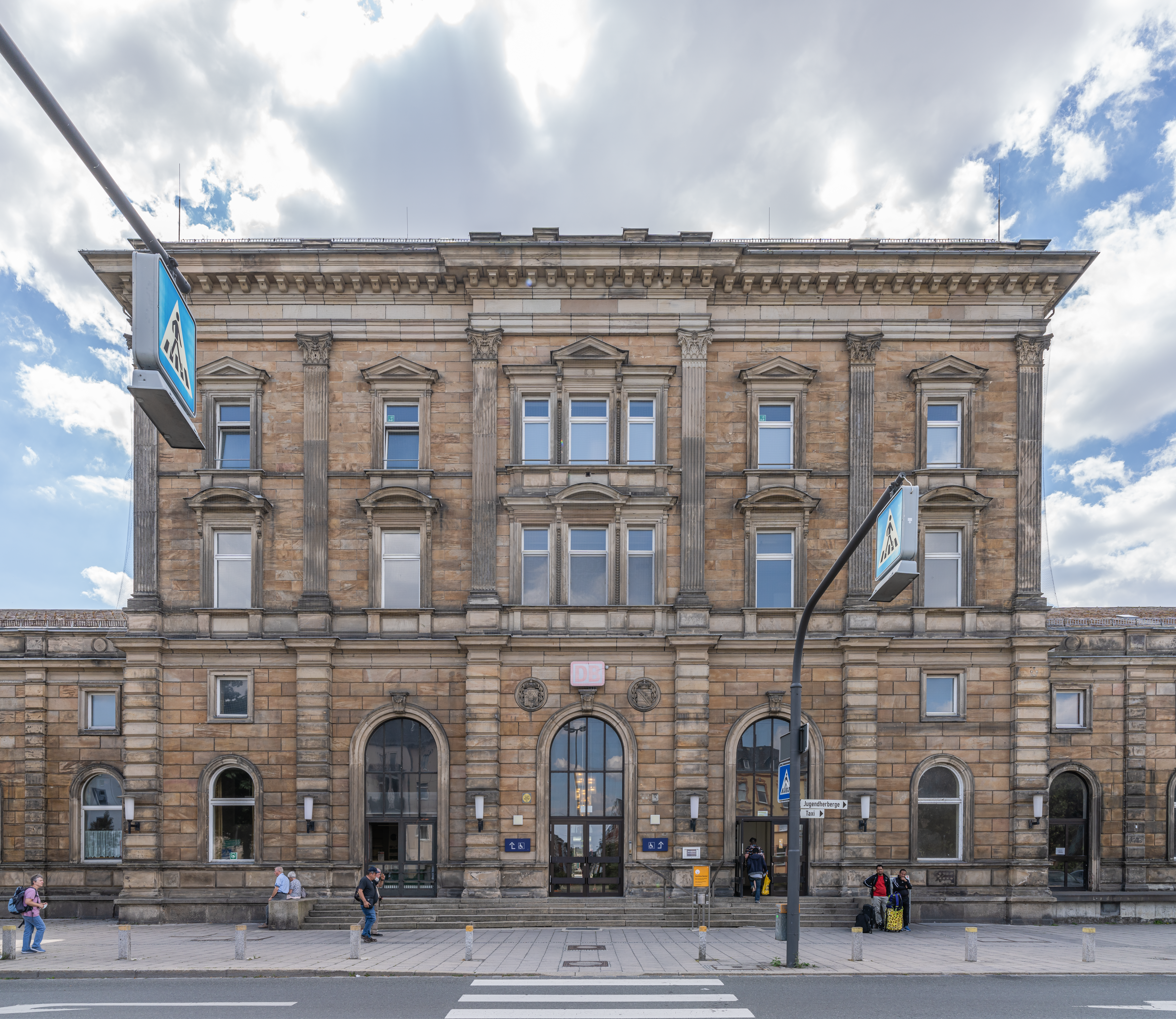
Station building

After the Second World War Hof was cut off to the north and east by the Iron Curtain and returned to being just the junction between two railway administrations. The Hell Valley Railway (Höllentalbahn) was closed and eventually lifted, the line from Hof to Cheb remained in use only for goods traffic, and one of the two tracks on the Hof-Plauen railway was dismantled for war reparations. All Deutsche Bundesbahn (DB) trains (with the exception of the inter-zonal trains from Regensburg/Munich and Nuremberg to Leipzig and Dresden and the transit trains to Berlin) began and ended in Hof. Locomotives on the interzonal and transit trains were exchanged in Hof. Trains to the German Democratic Republic (GDR) were hauled by Deutsche Reichsbahn locomotives, whilst trains from the GDR were hauled by DB locomotives. Despite that, there were no border controls at Hof; these took place on board the trains or at the border station of Gutenfürst.

When the GDR began to collapse in 1989 (the time of the so-called Wende or political change) trains with refugees from the German embassy in Prague arrived at Hof and were greeted there by German politicians.

Following Die Wende the importance of Hof Hauptbahnhof for railway traffic initially rose once more. The Hof–Plauen railway was rebuilt with two tracks again. In 1991 a rapid regional link was introduced between Hof and Nuremberg using tilting trains of Class 610, which were also heavily used by passengers changing from Saxony and Thuringia. Interregio connexions between Stuttgart and Dresden (via Nuremberg, Hof and Chemnitz, the Saxon-Franconian trunk line) as well as Munich and Berlin (via Regensburg, Hof and Leipzig) were introduced and the pair of night trains from Munich to Berlin and Stuttgart to Dresden met daily in both directions at Hof and exchanged through coaches. In 2001 Hof was even an ICE stop after the link from Nuremberg to Dresden was upgraded to an ICE route with ICE-TD units. Thereafter the significance of Hof for rail traffic gradually receded again. After the withdrawal of the ICE-TD trains the Nuremberg–Dresden line was downgraded initially to an InterCity route again, using Class 612 trains. In 2006 however these were replaced by regional trains that plied between Nuremberg and Hof as well as Hof and Dresden and forced passengers to change at Hof. Likewise, the Interregio line, Munich-Berlin, was reduced to a regional service (with changes at Regensburg, Hof and Leipzig, and frequent stops), which actually led to a growth in passenger traffic on the ICE line Munich-Nuremberg–Bamberg–Leipzig–Berlin, but meant long waits for passengers in north-east Bavaria, because to get to Munich or Berlin a longer journey to Nuremberg or Bamberg was now needed. Meanwhile, a regional through express runs every three hours between Hof and Munich. Similarly, on the introduction of a shut-down of operations on the Marktredwitz–Regensburg route, the crossing point of the Munich–Berlin and Stuttgart–Dresden night train pairs was moved to Nuremberg.

Since the switch from an Intercity link to an Interregioexpress service, the journey time on the Nuremberg–Hof–Dresden route has been reduced by 39 minutes, even though Hof is now no longer officially a long-distance stop.

=== Goods traffic ===
On the western side of the station is the goods station with its former marshalling yard. The marshalling yard was heavily used until the 1990s and also served the industrial lines of several firms based there (including haulage firms, a mineral oil dealers with its own tank facilities and a scrap merchants). On the eastern side of the station, between the passenger station and the Saxon (northern) locomotive depot or Betriebswerk, is the railway post office hall, in which the post trains were made ready for dispatch. In addition, on the northern edge of the neighbouring station of Oberkotzau there was a small shunting yard with five tracks, the remains of another former marshalling yard which, until the mid-1920s, was linked with the goods station in Hof by a third track between Hof and Oberkotzau. After being closed for several years, a Hof haulage contractor opened a container station in about 2000 in the Hof goods station, which has been expanded several times. In the goods station today there are still twelve tracks, a hump at the northern end and a headshunt at the southern end, from which shunting is carried out. The marshalling sidings at Oberkotzau station, by contrast, were removed in 2000. Likewise, in the 1990s, the railway post hall was closed. Today only a branch of the Deutsche Post, between the former railway post hall and the passenger station, remains in operation - a relict of the railway postal services.

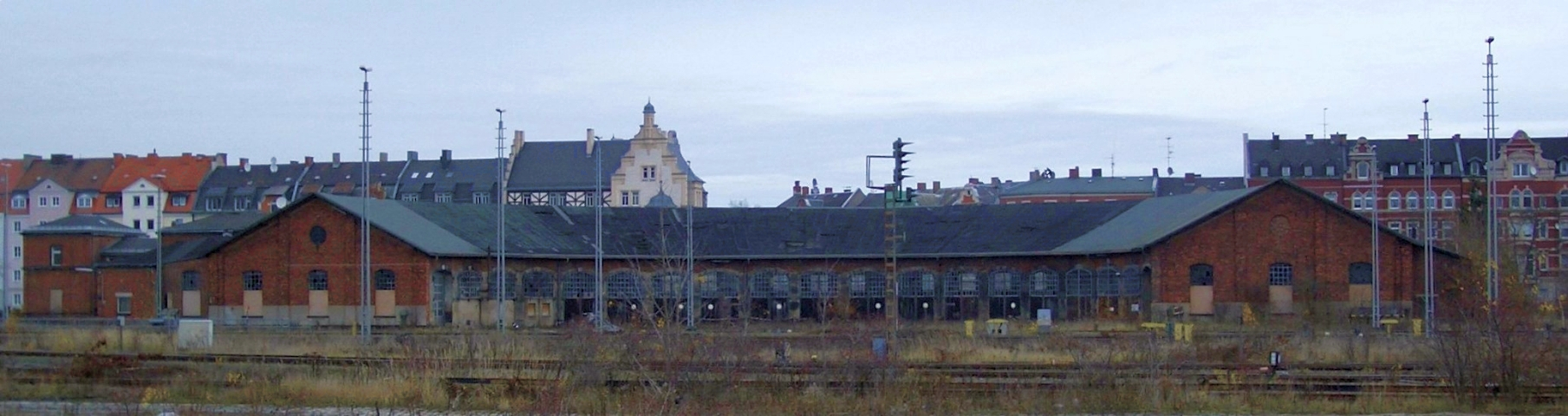
Former Saxon (northern) roundhouse, later storage shed for regional buses

=== Bahnbetriebswerk Hof ===
After the end of the Länderbahn era, the northern, Saxon Betriebswerk was united with the southern, Bavarian, one. At the end of the steam age the southern facilities of the depot were knocked down and replaced by new ones. This successor to the Bavarian depot has been further modernised and extended over the decades, and is still in operation today. The Saxon facilities, by contrast, were closed in the 1970s and largely broken up after that. Only the former locomotive shed 3 has been preserved. It has been used for years as a bus garage.

Until the 1990s, classes 211 (V 100) and 798 (railbus) were stabled here at Hof and, later, the Class 628 as well. After that, it increasingly lost its importance and was even threatened with closure at times.

After modernisation, at a cost of €4M, and expansion during 2000 and 2001 as the depot for the tilting trains of classes 612 and 605 (the latter until its withdrawal in December 2003), the future of the depot was secured. Today the Betriebswerk is the main base for DB Regio Oberfranken and the home for 45 Class 612 and 27 Class 628 units (as at 2007).

A major accident occurred at Betriebswerk Hof on 2 September 2001. The ICE-TD unit, number 605 009, fell from the lifting platform (Hebebühne) and was badly damaged. The vehicle was initially kept for spare parts but, after the withdrawal of Class 605, it was taken away to Chemnitz for scrapping on the night of 18/19 April 2004 on a low loader.

== Track numbering in the Hauptbahnhof ==
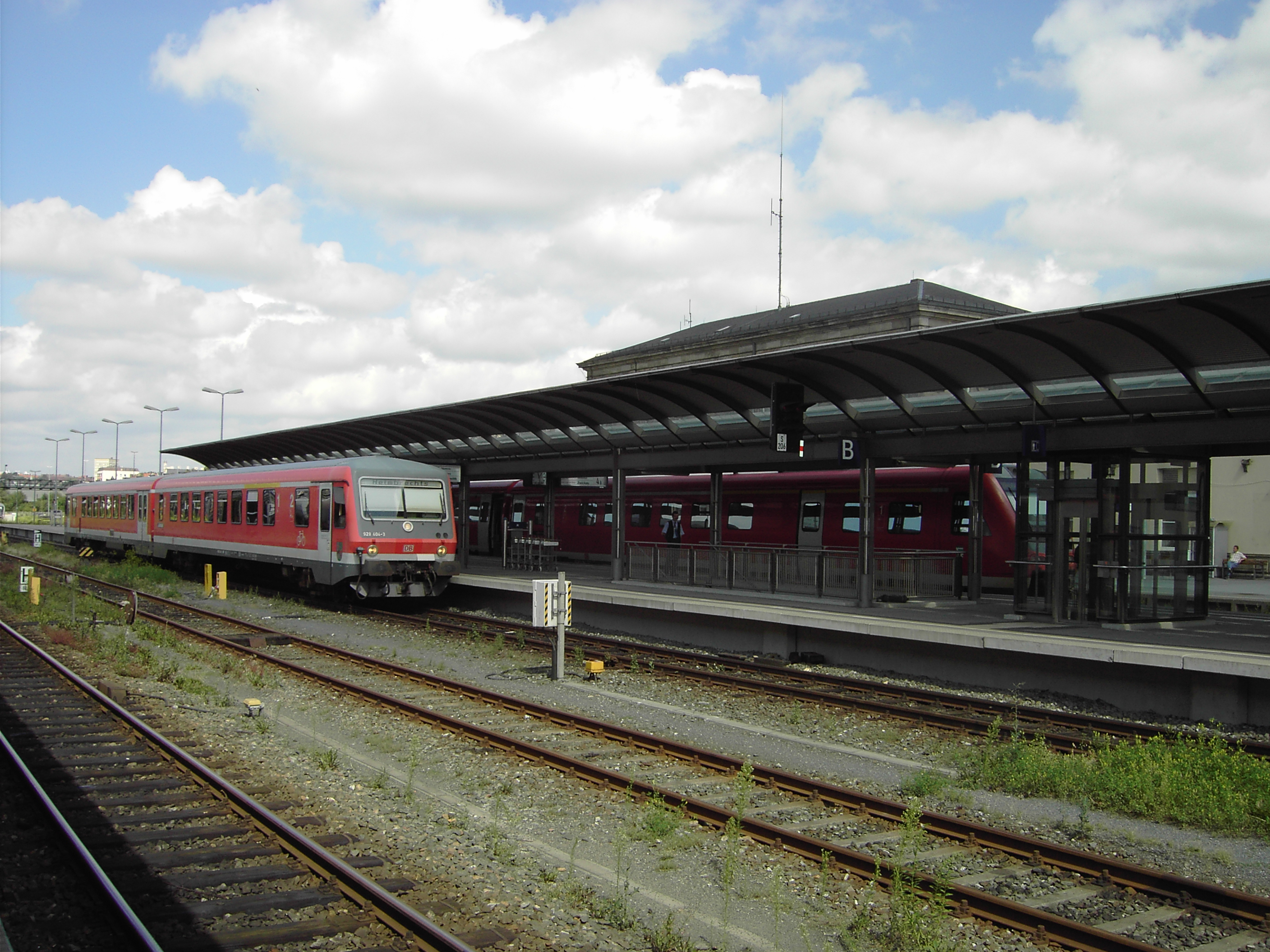
Platform (tracks 4 and 6)

Hof does not have the normal platform numbers 1, 2, 3, 4, etc. Instead the platforms are numbered 1a (southern stub track on the home platform), 1b (northern stub track on the home platform), 2 (home platform), 4 and 6 (second pair of platforms), and 8 and 10 (third pair). Even on the through platforms, the southern sections are indicated with an "a", and the northern sections with a "b" (2a/b, etc.). The missing numbers are, or were, allocated to operating tracks not used by scheduled passenger services.

== The "Old Station" ==
Today, sections of the original Hof station have survived. The station was opened in 1848 as part of the Ludwig South-North Railway and Saxon-Bavarian Railway. It was situated near Hof city centre and was thus laid out as a terminal station. In the face of rising demand for a border station between Bavaria and Saxony, the old station rapidly proved inadequate. In 1880 it was replaced by the new Hauptbahnhof and closed.

The old station building stood on the site of the present-day town post office on Dr.-Konrad-Adenauer-Platz (lately Postplatz, formerly Bahnhofsplatz). The post office at first used the station building of the old station. At the start of the 20th century the station building was replaced by a new post office block, that still exists today. Directly behind the post office – on Hallplatz – is another large section of the original Einsteighalle (boarding hall) of the old station. Over the course of time the hall was slightly shortened. It serves today as a storage hall for vehicles of the volunteer fire service in Hof, the Freiwillige Feuerwehr Hof. In the yard of the former station on the edge of Hof's city centre there are still one or two former goods sheds. On the site of the first station the name of the restaurant, Alter Bahnhof opposite the post office recalls the existence of the old station as do plaques on the post office building and the Einsteighalle.
