= Keilbahnhof =

Type of train station located between branching tracks

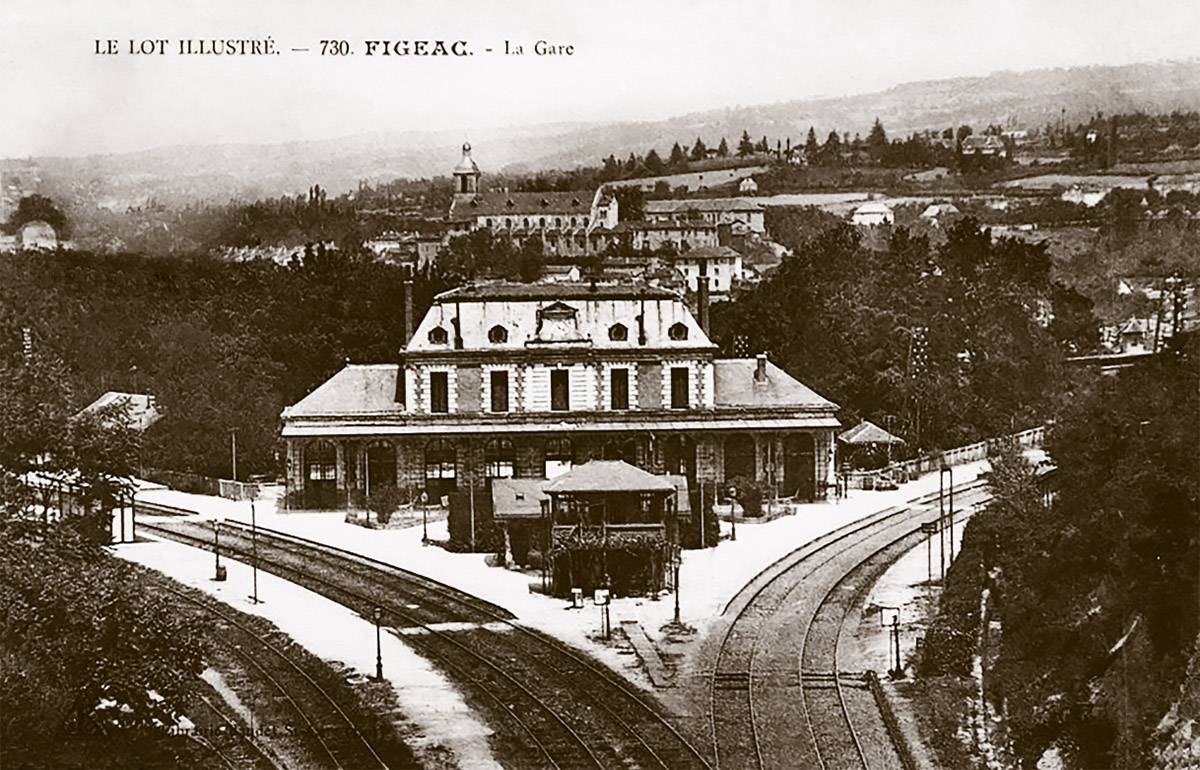
Keilbahnhof in Figeac, France

Keilbahnhof (plural: Keilbahnhöfe), lit. 'wedge railway station', is the German name for a railway station (Bahnhof) in which the station is located between branching railway tracks. It is a junction station that is part of the railway junction itself, with its platforms converging in one direction and diverging in the other. There appears to be no direct English equivalent for this term.

== Definition ==
Diagram of a Keilbahnhof (red: station building, gray: platforms)

A keilbahnhof is a type of junction station whose tracks usually diverge shortly before passing the platforms, and the station building being located between the tracks. The through tracks thus pass by on either side of the station building without rejoining one another again. This is in contrast to an "island station" (German: Inselbahnhof) such as Olten station, at which the tracks merge again after passing either side of the station building (i.e. the building sits on a wide island platform). Rarely, there are keilbahnhof stations whose through tracks diverge in the area of the platforms, but never after them. In a keilbahnhof, there are at least two platforms, one on each side of the station building (e.g. Lichtensteig railway station), but additional platforms (or sidings) may be present on one or both sides.

The Y-shaped design of a keilbahnhof is not suited for splitting trains into separate rakes with different destinations (portion working). Often, the station is the terminus of the line(s) operating on the subordinate branch, while for the service(s) operating on the main branches it is a through station, although it can also be a through station on all services.

The station building can be located either between the diverging tracks or on the side of the tracks before they diverge (e.g. Monza railway station).

== Examples in Germany ==
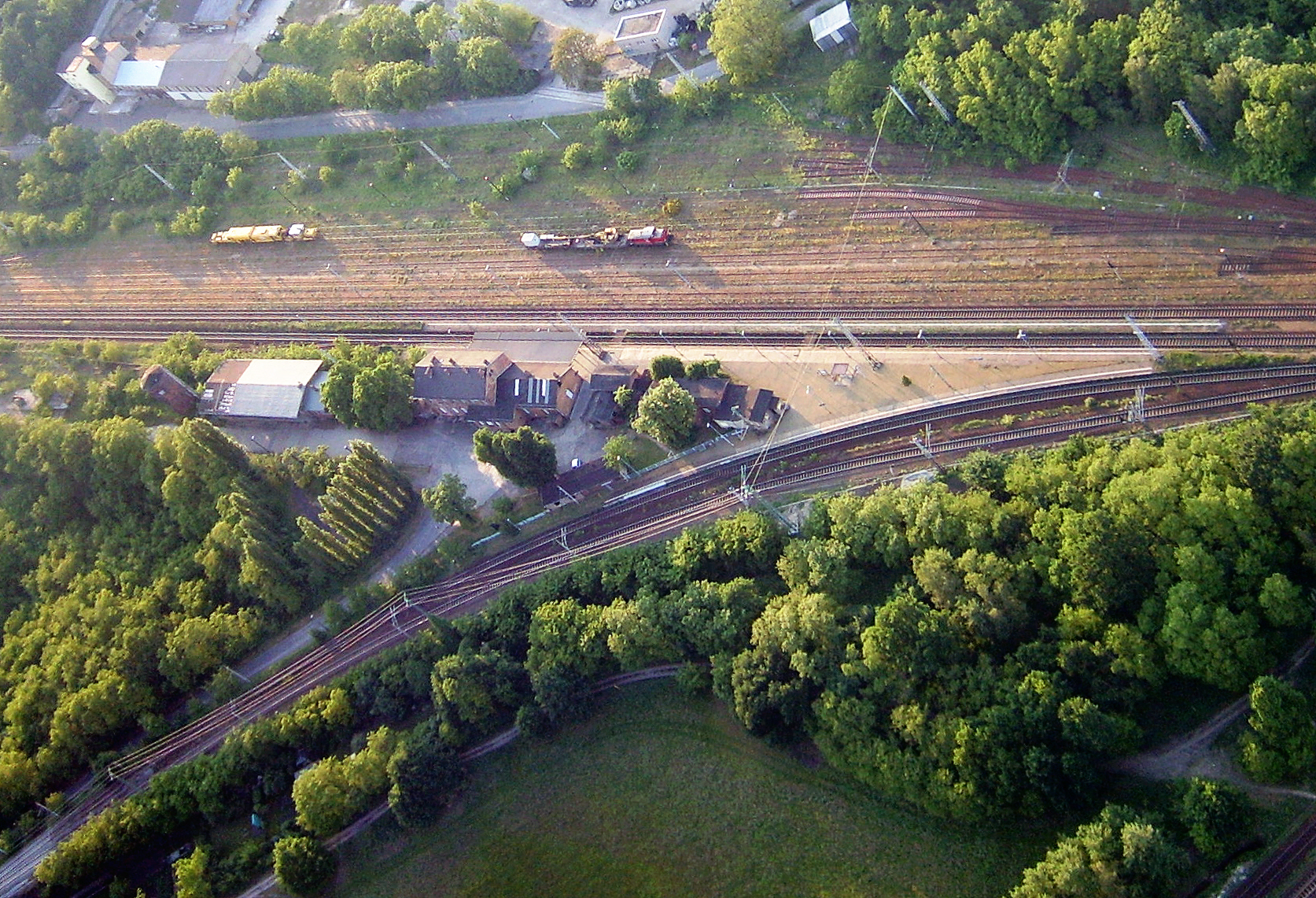
Elsterwerda-Biehla station

- Altshausen on the Herbertingen–Aulendorf and Altshausen–Schwackenreute lines
- Berga-Kelbra on the Halle–Hann. Münden line
- Döbeln Hauptbahnhof on the Riesa–Chemnitz and Borsdorf–Coswig lines
- Elsterwerda-Biehla on the Węgliniec–Roßlau and Elsterwerda–Elsterwerda-Biehla lines
- Fröttstädt on the Halle–Bebra and Friedrichroda lines
- Hagenow Land on the Berlin-Hamburg and Hagenow Land–Schwerin lines
- Kreiensen on the Hanoverian Southern, Altenbeken–Kreiensen and Brunswick Southern lines
- Nordstemmen on the Hanoverian Southern and Lehrte–Nordstemmen lines
- Northeim (Han) on the Hanoverian Southern, South Harz and Solling lines
- Oberkotzau on the Bamberg–Hof, Cheb–Oberkotzau and Weiden–Oberkotzau lines
- Wittenberge on the Berlin–Hamburg, Magdeburg-Wittenberge and Wittenberge–Buchholz lines
- Zwickau Hbf on the Dresden–Werdau and Schwarzenberg–Zwickau lines

== Examples elsewhere ==
=== Australia ===
- Werris Creek on the Main North, Mungindi and Binnaway lines
- Brighton Beach on the Sandringham Line in Melbourne.

=== Austria ===
- Wien Erzherzog-Karl-Straße on the Laaer Ostbahn and Marchegger Ostbahn lines

=== Belgium ===
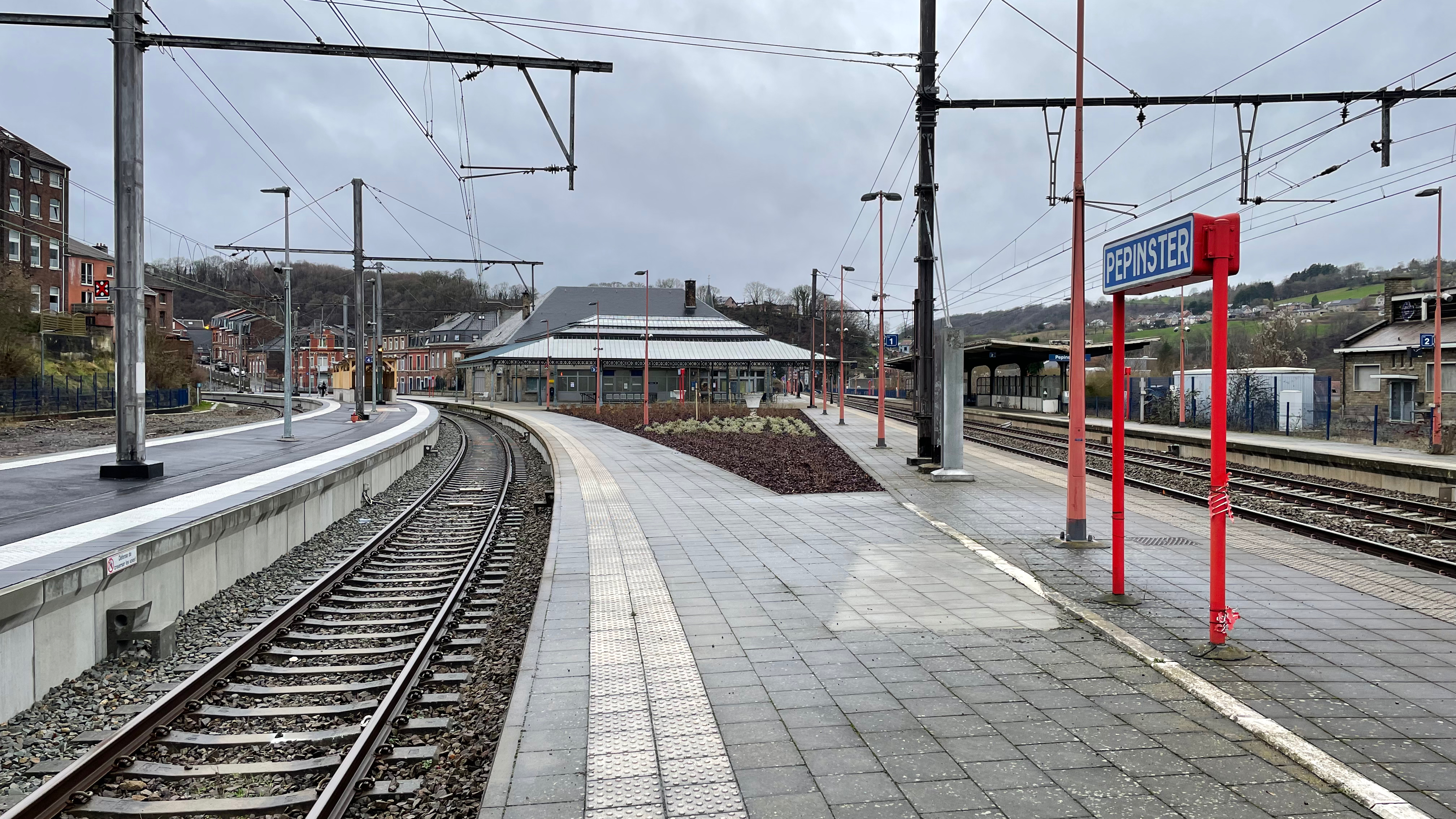
Pepinster railway station, Belgium

- Ottignies on the Belgian railway lines 139, 140 and the 161
- Pepinster on the Belgian railway lines 37 and 44

=== France ===
- Bellegarde on the Haut-Bugey and Lyon–Geneva lines
- Lyon (Perrache) on the Paris–Marseille, Moret–Lyon and Lyon–Geneva lines
- Figeac on the Figeac–Arvant and Brive-la-Gaillarde–Toulouse (via Capdenac) lines
- Tarascon on the Tarascon–Sète line and two connectors to the Paris–Marseille lines
- Serquigny on the Paris-Cherbourg line at the junction with the line from Serquigny to Oissel and Rouen

=== Ireland ===
- Howth Junction on the Belfast–Dublin line and Howth branch

=== Italy ===
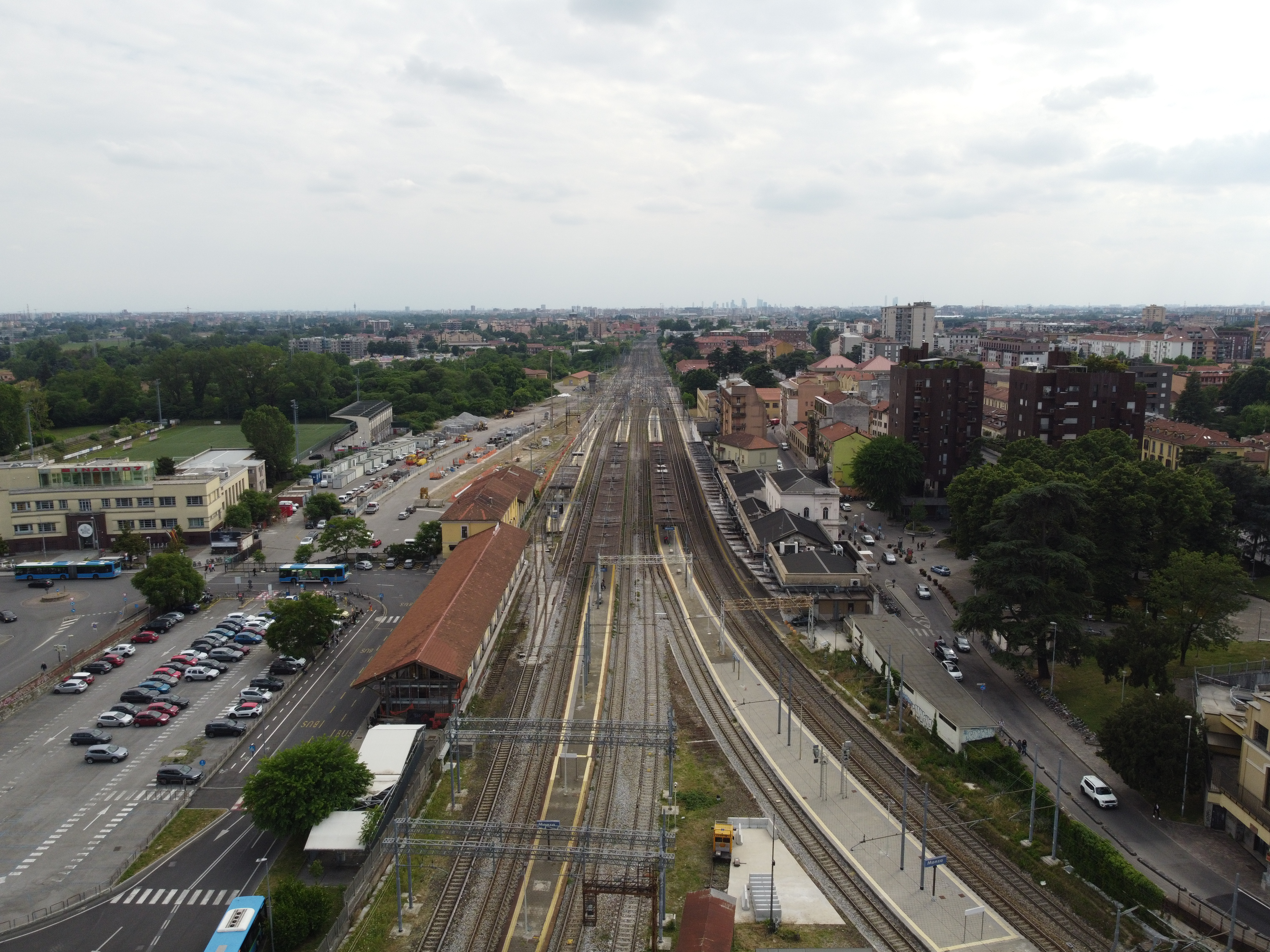
Monza railway station, Italy

- Monza on the Milan–Chiasso, Lecco–Milan and Monza–Molteno lines
- Pisa San Rossore on the Genoa–Pisa and Pisa–Lucca lines

=== New Zealand ===
- Hamilton on the North Island Main Trunk (NIMT) and East Coast Main Trunk (ECMT) lines

=== Switzerland ===
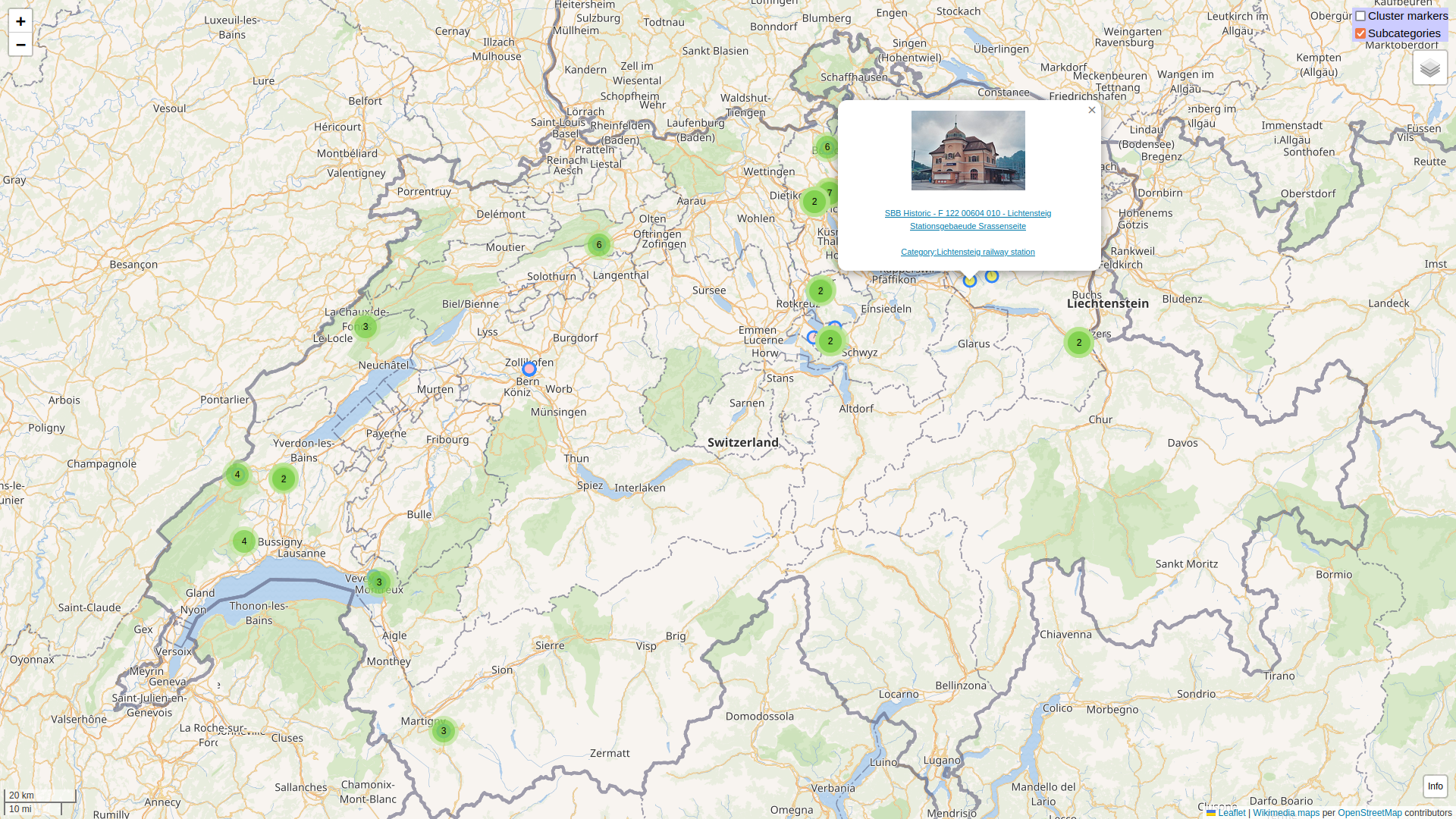
Keilbahnhof stations in Switzerland (by location of geocoded photos on Wikimedia Commons)

- Apples on the Bière–Apples–Morges line and branch line to L'Isle-Mont-la-Ville
- Arth-Goldau on the Thalwil–Arth-Goldau, Pfäffikon–Arth-Goldau and Gotthard lines
- Bern Wankdorf on the Bern–Thun, Biel/Bienne–Bern and Olten–Bern lines
- Bülach on the Winterthur–Koblenz and Oerlikon–Bülach lines
- Chavornay on the Orbe–Chavornay and Jura Foot lines
- Le Day on the Vallorbe–Le Brassus and Simplon lines (until 2022)
- Lichtensteig on the Wil–Ebnat-Kappel and Bodensee–Toggenburg lines
- Moutier on the Basel–Biel/Bienne, Solothurn–Moutier and Sonceboz-Sombeval–Moutier lines
- Oensingen on the Langenthal–Oensingen, Oensingen–Balsthal and Jura Foot lines
- Sargans on the Chur–Rorschach and Ziegelbrücke–Sargans lines
- Sembrancher on the Martigny–Orsières line and branch line to Le Châble
- Worblaufen on the Solothurn–Worblaufen, Worb Dorf–Worblaufen and Zollikofen–Bern lines
- Zug on the Thalwil–Arth-Goldau, Zug–Lucerne and Zürich–Zug lines
- Zürich Oerlikon on the Zürich–Winterthur and Oerlikon–Bülach lines

=== The Netherlands ===
- Amsterdam Muiderpoort on the Amsterdam–Arnhem and Amsterdam–Zutphen lines
- Formerly Kesteren on the Elst–Dordrecht and Kesteren–Amersfoort lines

=== United Kingdom ===
- Barnt Green on the Cross-City and Birmingham to Worcester via Bromsgrove lines
- Dalmuir on the Argyle, North Clyde and West Highland lines
- Helsby on the Chester–Manchester and Hooton–Helsby lines
- Kidsgrove on the Stafford–Manchester and Crewe–Derby lines
- Kilwinning on the Ayrshire Coast Line
- Lewes on the East Coastway lines
- Lewisham on the North Kent and Mid-Kent lines; The latter is also used as a loop off the South Eastern Main Line
- Limehouse on the London, Tilbury and Southend line and the Docklands Light Railway (DLR)
- Motherwell on the Argyle Line and West Coast Main Line
- Perth on the Highland Main Line and Glasgow–Dundee line
- Sutton on the Portsmouth and the Epsom Downs lines

=== United States ===
- Canton Junction on the Providence/Stoughton Line (Northeast Corridor and Stoughton Branch)
- Clybourn on the UP North and UP Northwest lines
- Denville on the Morristown and Montclair–Boonton lines
- Point of Rocks on the Baltimore–Ohio and Old Main lines
