= Oberkotzau station =

Railway station in Germany

Oberkotzau
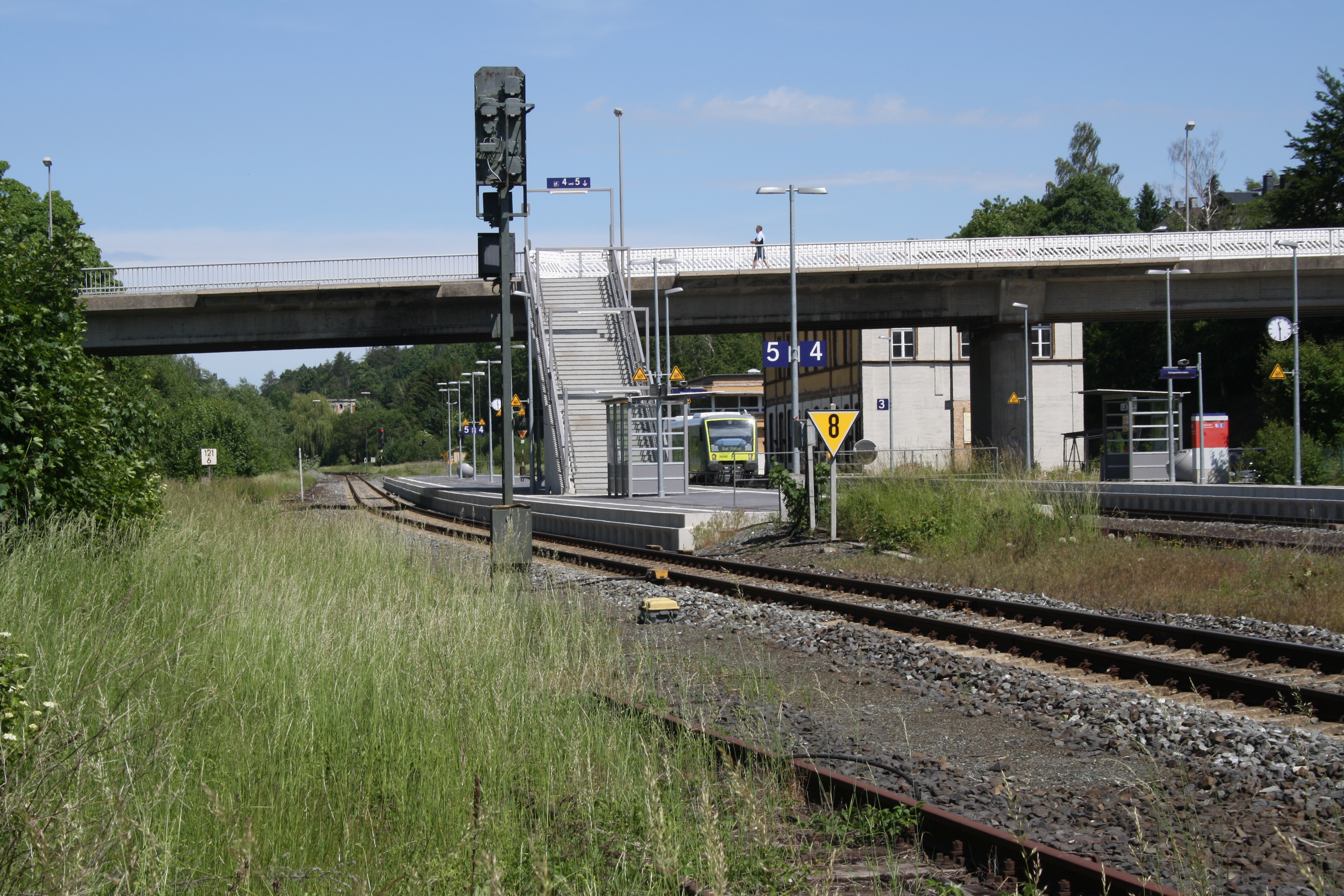
- 2019

General information
- Location: Bahnhofstraße; 95145 Oberkotzau; Bavaria; Germany
- Coordinates: 50.2664°N 11.9321°E
- Elevation: 485 m (1,591 ft)
- System: Keilbahnhof
- Owner: Deutsche Bahn
- Operator: DB Station&Service
- Lines: Weiden–Oberkotzau railway (KBS 855); Bamberg–Hof railway (KBS 850); Cheb–Oberkotzau railway (KBS 858)
- Platforms: 2 island platforms
- Tracks: 4
- Train operators: agilis; DB Regio Bayern
- Connections: RBRE

Construction
- Parking: yes
- Cycle facilities: no
- Accessible: partly

Other information
- Station code: 4658
- DS100 code: NOKP
- IBNR: 8000287
- Category: 5
- Website: www.bahnhof.de

Services
Preceding station		Following station
Hof Hbf towards Hof-Neuhof	RB 95	Wurlitz towards Marktredwitz
Hof Hbf towards Hof-Neuhof	RB 96	Wurlitz towards Selb Stadt
Hof Hbf towards Bad Steben	RB 97	Martinlamitz towards Bayreuth Hbf
Hof Hbf Terminus	RB 98	Schwarzenbach (Saale) towards Helmbrechts
Hof Hbf Terminus	RB 99	Schwarzenbach (Saale) towards Neuenmarkt-Wirsberg
Preceding station	DB Regio Bayern	Following station
Hof Hbf One-way operation	RE 2 Limited service	Marktredwitz towards Regensburg Hbf
Hof Hbf Terminus	RE 30 Peak-time services	Schwarzenbach (Saale) towards Nürnberg Hbf
Hof Hbf Terminus	RE 31	Marktredwitz towards Nürnberg Hbf
Hof Hbf One-way operation	RE 35 Limited service	Schwarzenbach (Saale) towards Bamberg
Location
- Location within Bavaria Location within Germany Location within Europe

Oberkotzau station is a railway station in the municipality of Oberkotzau, located in the Hof district in Bavaria, Germany. It is a Keilbahnhof.
