= Ebensfeld station =

Railway station in Germany

Ebensfeld
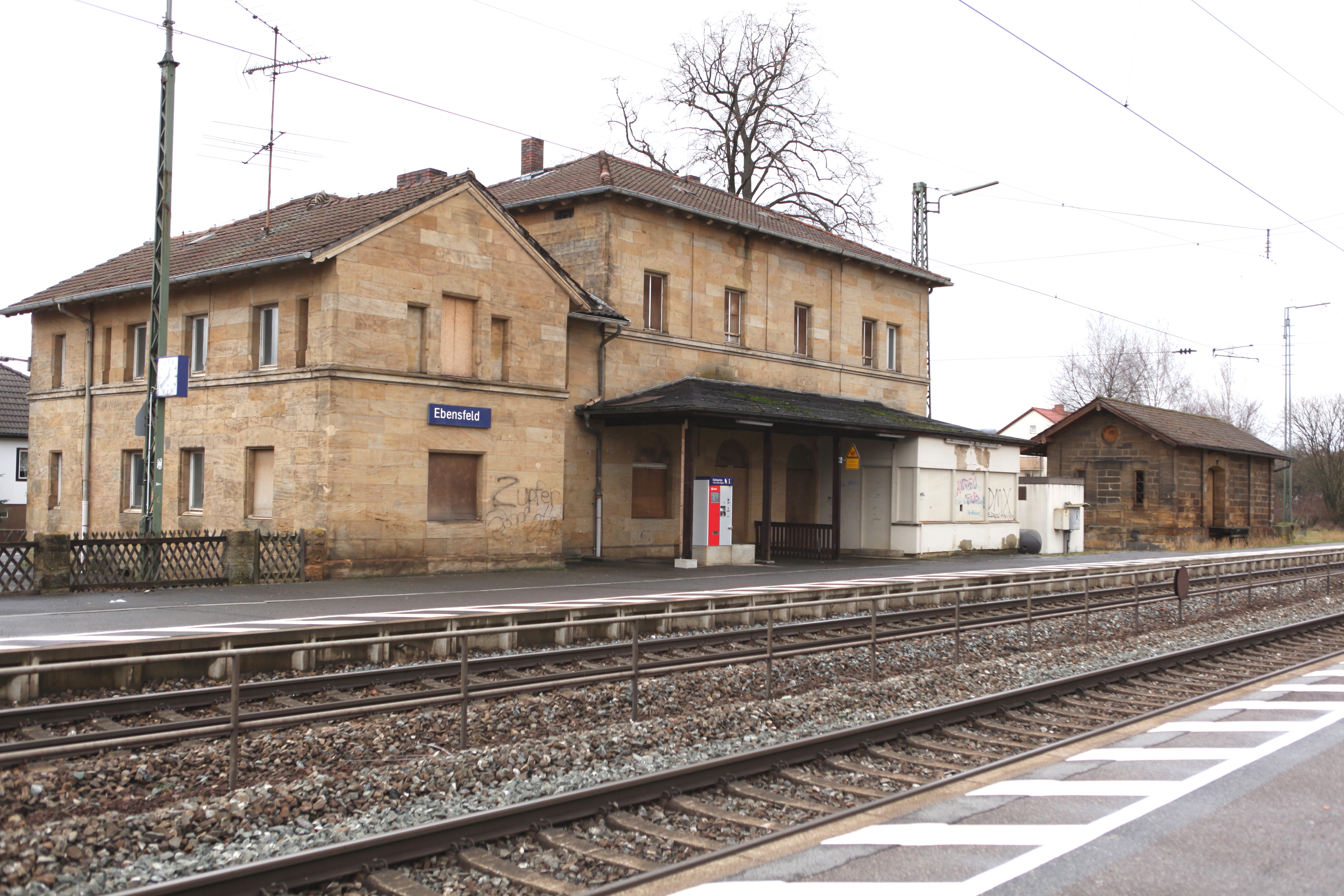

General information
- Location: Bahnhofstraße 18; 96250 Ebensfeld; Bavaria; Germany
- Coordinates: 50.0690°N 10.9546°E
- Owner: DB Netz
- Operator: DB Station&Service
- Lines: Bamberg–Hof railway Nuremberg–Erfurt high-speed railway
- Platforms: 2 side platforms
- Tracks: 2
- Train operators: agilis; DB Regio Franken

Other information
- Station code: 1431
- DS100 code: NED
- IBNR: 8001623
- Category: 6
- Fare zone: VGN: 1182
- Website: www.bahnhof.de

History
- Opened: 15 February 1846; 180 years ago

Services
Preceding station	DB Regio Bayern	Following station
Zapfendorf towards Nürnberg Hbf	RE 14	Bad Staffelstein towards Saalfeld (Saale)
Zapfendorf towards Nürnberg Hbf	RE 28	Bad Staffelstein towards Sonneberg
Zapfendorf towards Bamberg	RB 25	Bad Staffelstein towards Kronach
Preceding station		Following station
Zapfendorf towards Ebermannstadt	RB 22	Bad Staffelstein towards Lichtenfels
Location
- Location within Bavaria

Ebensfeld station is a railway station in the municipality of Ebensfeld, located in the Lichtenfels district in Upper Franconia, Germany.
