= Bamberg–Hof railway =

Main line that runs through Bavaria in southern Germany

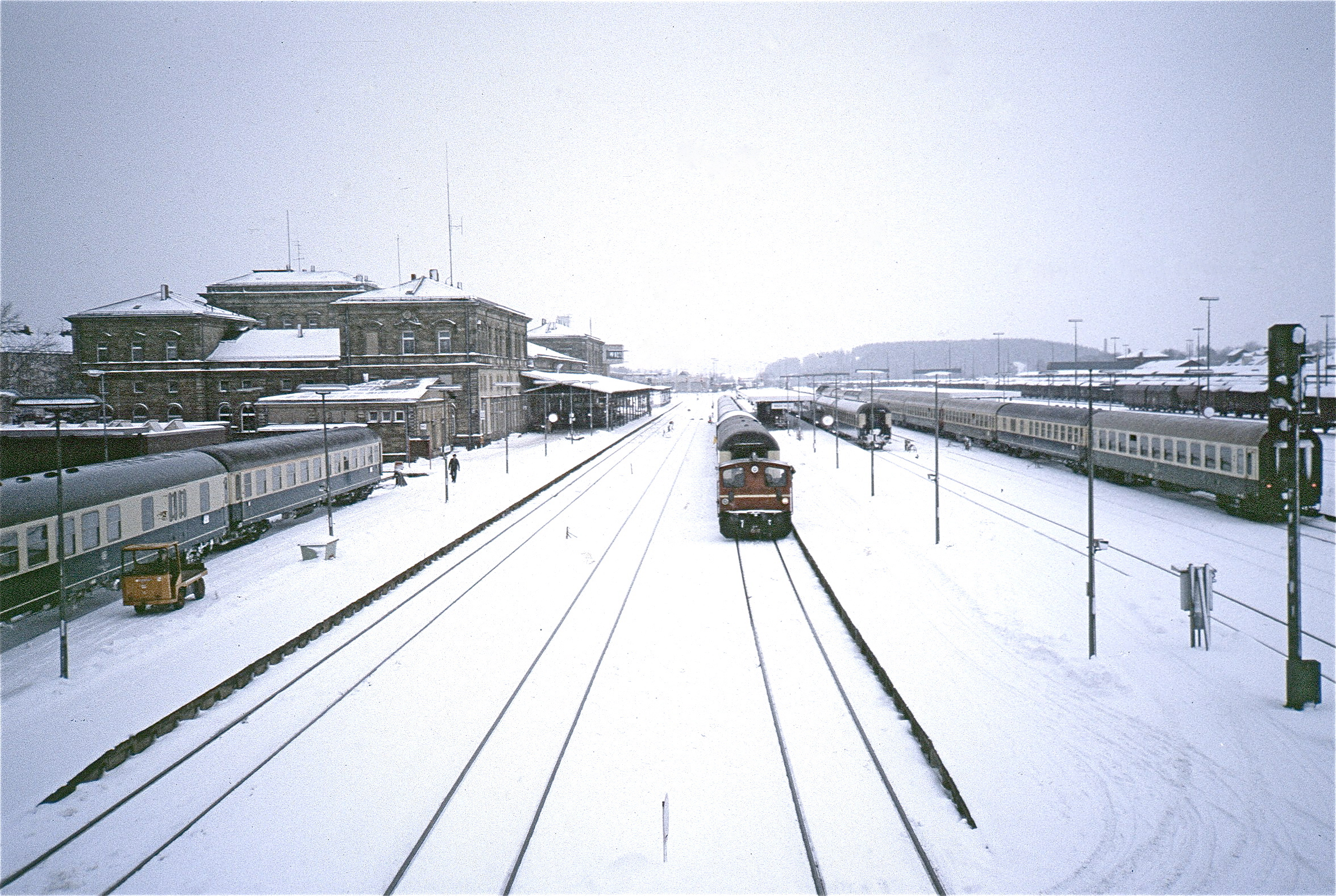
- Hof Hauptbahnhof, 1986

Overview
- Line number: 5100
- Locale: Bavaria, Germany

Service
- Route number: 512, 820, 850

Technical
- Line length: 127.2 km (79.0 mi)
- Electrification: 15 kV/16.7 Hz AC catenary (Bamberg–Hochstadt am Main)
- Operating speed: 160 km/h (99.4 mph) (maximum)
- Maximum incline: 2.3%

The Bamberg–Hof railway is a 127 km (79 mi)-long main line that runs through Bavaria in southern Germany. The line runs from Bamberg via Lichtenfels, Kulmbach, Neuenmarkt-Wirsberg and Münchberg to Hof. The section from Hof to Neuenmarkt now forms part of the Saxon-Franconian trunk line.

== History ==
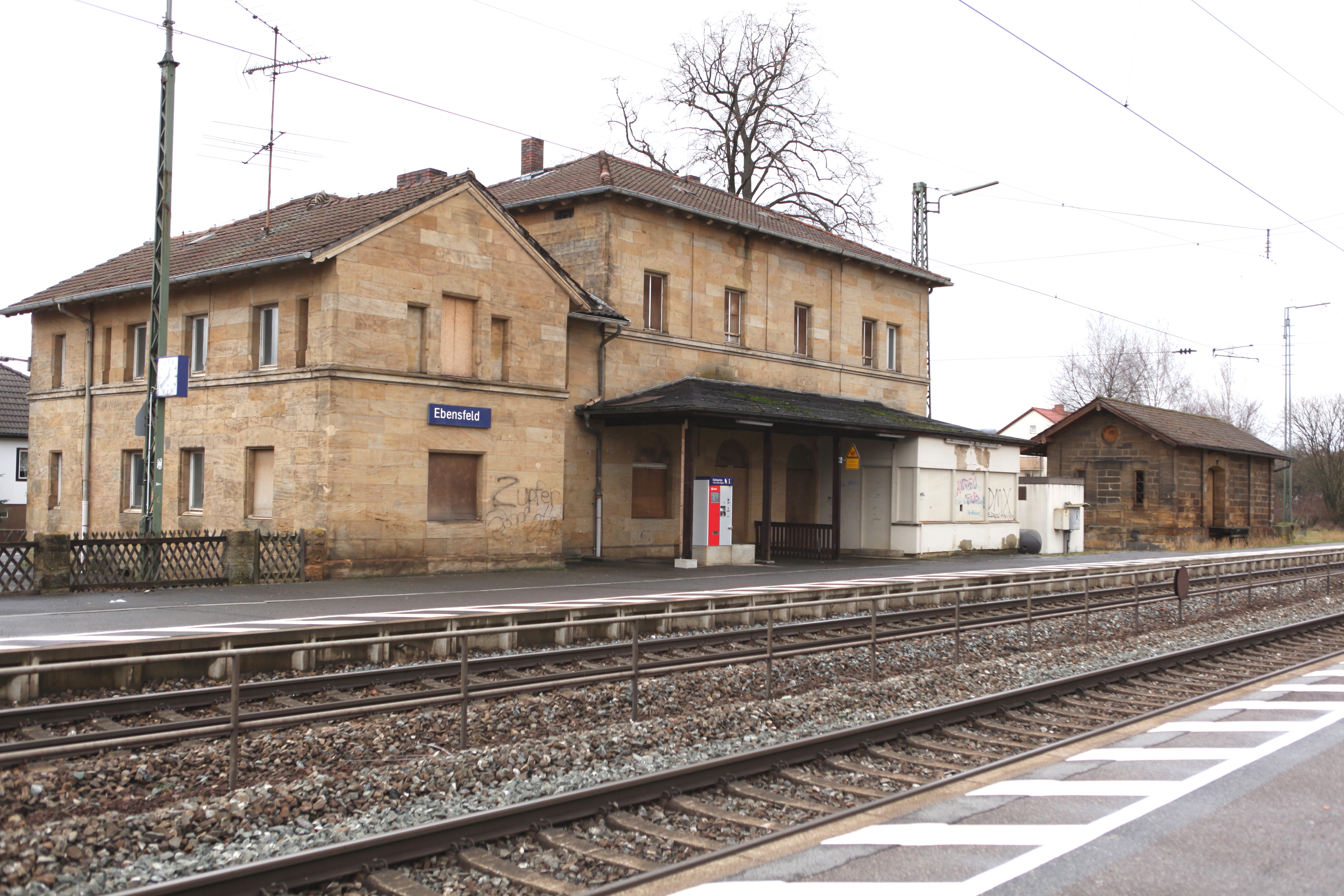
The station building of Ebensfeld dating from 1846, was demolished in 2015 during the construction of the Eltersdorf–Leipzig high-speed rail line

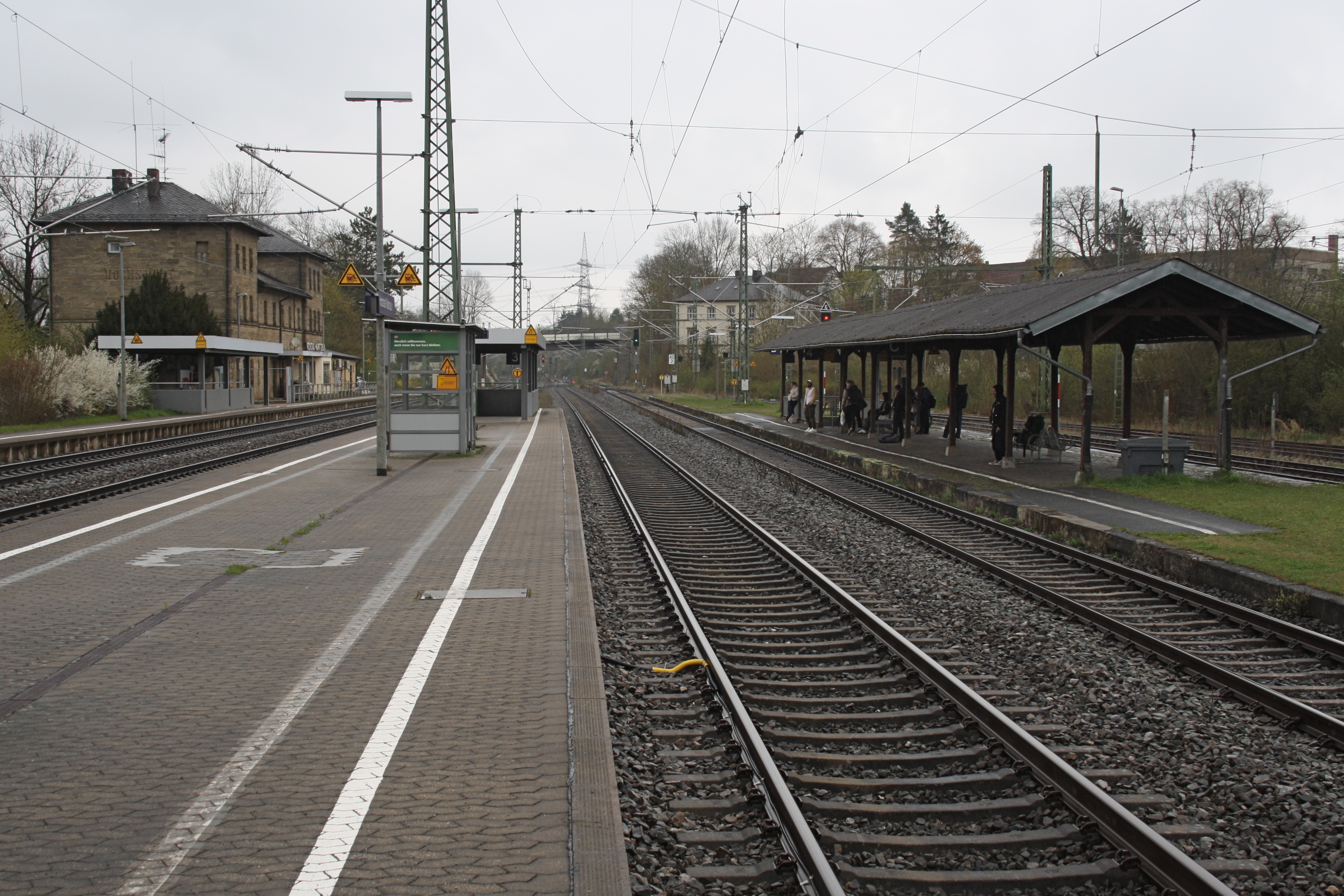
Hochstadt-Marktzeuln station, on the left the pair of tracks of the Hochstadt-Marktzeuln–Probstzella railway

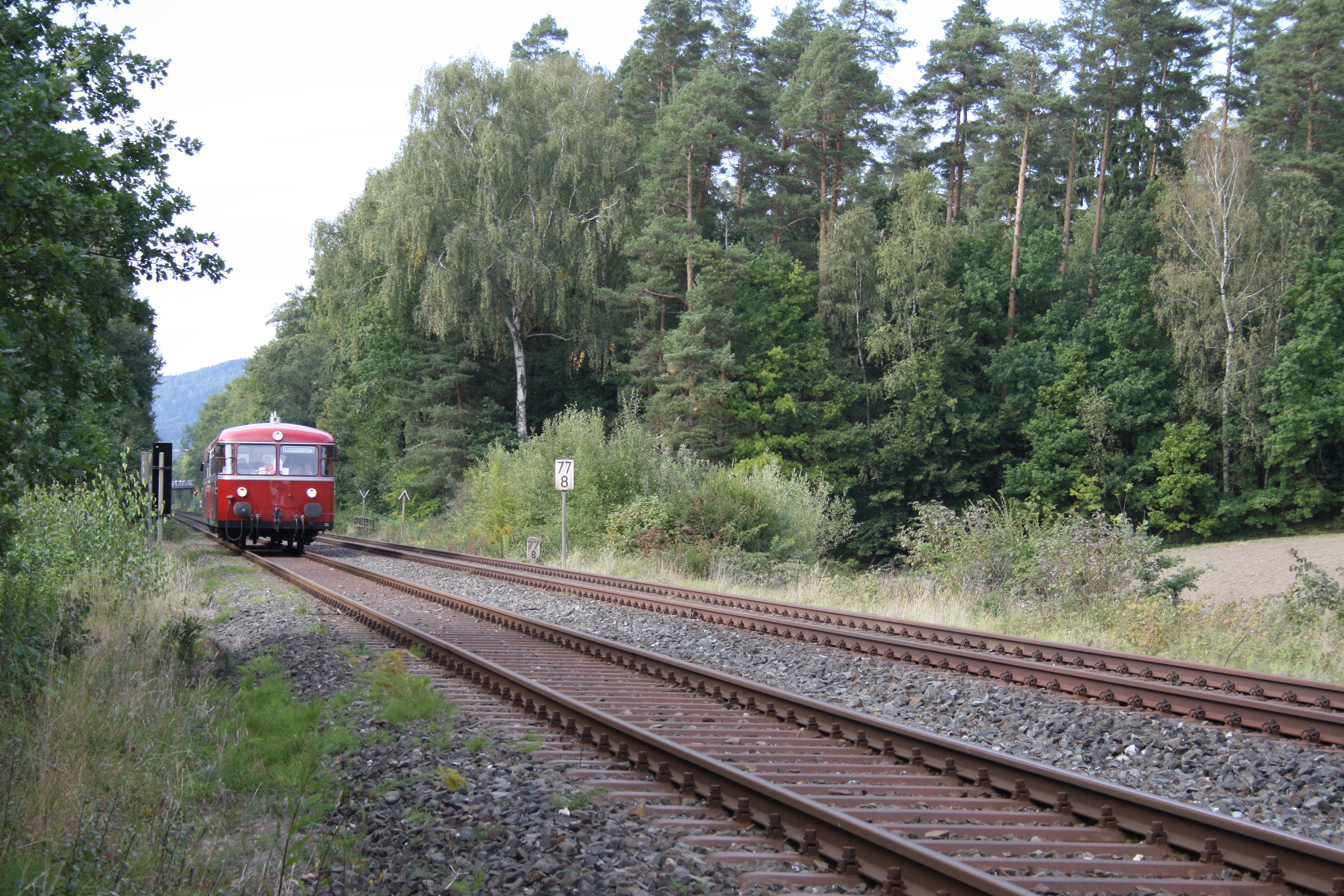
Railbus VT 98 of the DDM on the Schiefe Ebene (inclined plane

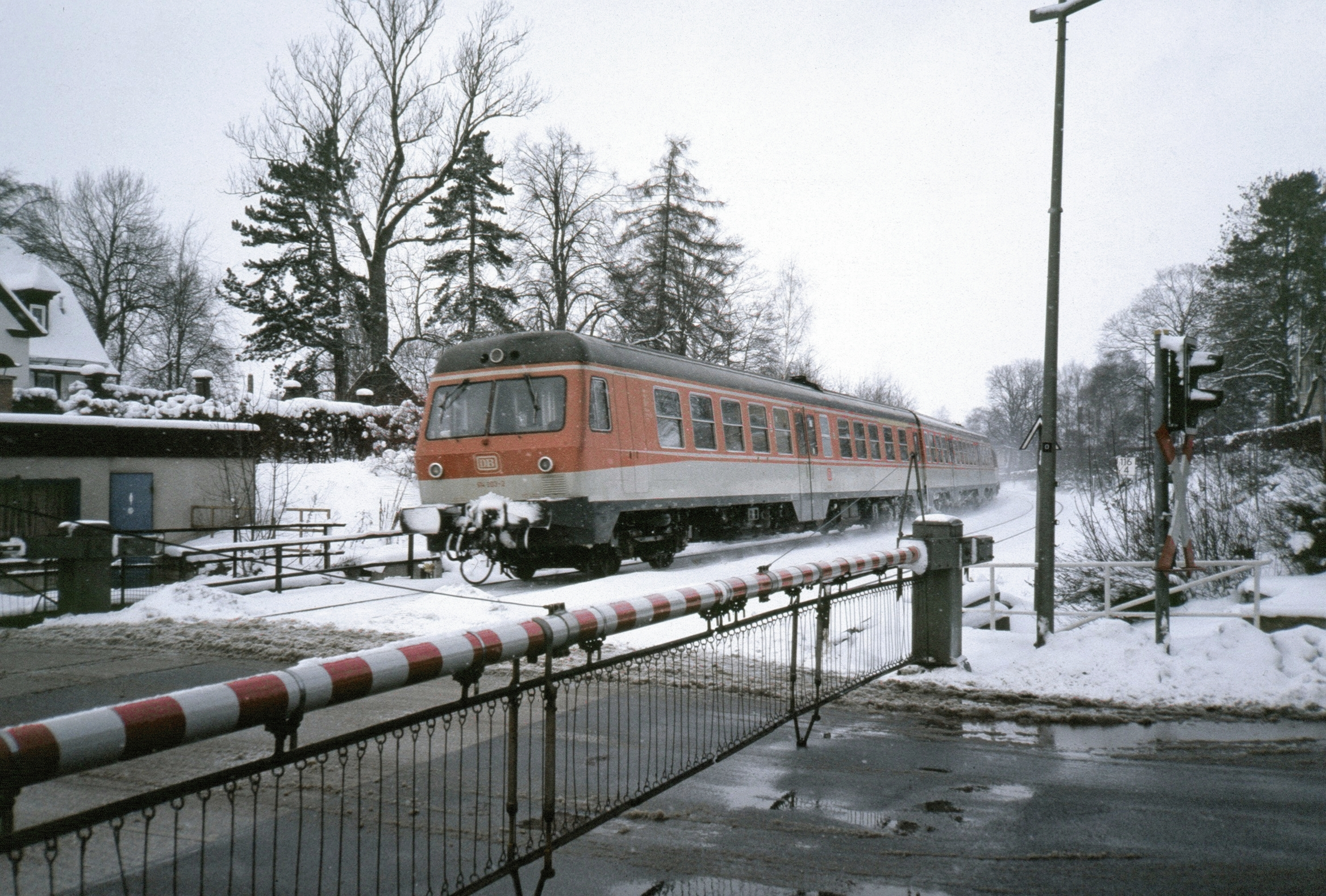
VT 614 in Schwarzenbach an der Saale, 1986

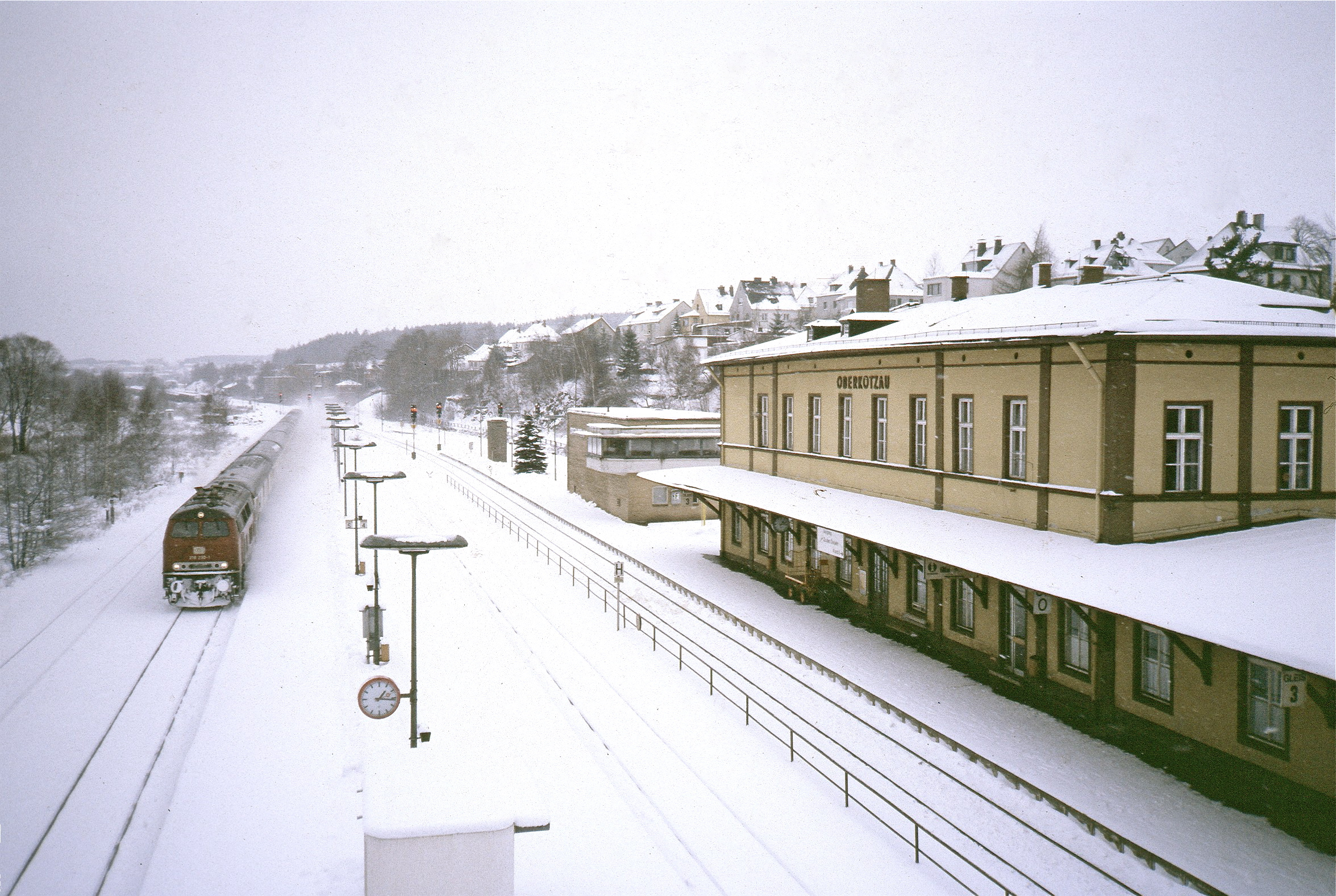
Express train passing through Oberkotzau station, 1986

The line is part of the Ludwig South-North Railway from Lindau to Hof. It was built in 3 stages between 1846 and 1848 by the Royal Bavarian State Railways.

The line was originally built as a single track; only the steep section known as the Schiefe Ebene (inclined plane) from Neuenmarkt to Marktschorgast was double-tracked from the beginning. A second track was opened in 1891 and the line was electrified from Bamberg to Lichtenfels and beyond that via the Franconian Forest Railway to Saalfeld on 10 May 1939.

On the afternoon of 12 May 1907, the Berlin–Munich express train (D 40) derailed near Ebensfeld station at about 80 km/h due to track buckling caused by extreme heat. All carriages derailed, but no one was seriously injured.

By the late 1960s, the line between Marktschorgast and Stammbach was dilapidated. During 1969, the section was reduced to single-track operation. The second track was dismantled starting in July 1970. However, the dismantling of the second track on much of the line was omitted due to the high costs of the dismantling and reconstruction work, coupled with the limited options available for timetable changes.

To enable through trains from Hof via Münchberg to Bayreuth, the Schlömener Curve was put into operation on 18 June 2000. It allows trains to travel directly from Marktschorgast towards Trebgast without stopping at Neuenmarkt station.

=== Opening dates ===
- 15 February 1846: Bamberg–Lichtenfels
- 15 October 1846: Lichtenfels–Neuenmarkt-Wirsberg
- 1 November 1848: Neuenmarkt-Wirsberg–Hof

=== Nuremberg-Ebensfeld upgrade ===
Parallel to the existing line, two tracks of the upgraded line are being built between Bamberg and Ebensfeld. The upgraded line is designed for speeds of up to 230 km/h (140 mph). The junction of the two lines is the new Unterleiterbach overtaking facility south of Ebensfeld.

As part of the upgrade between Breitengüßbach and Zapfendorf, the line between Lichtenfels and Bamberg was completely closed from 11 January to 4 September 2016. During this time, the stations Breitengüßbach, Ebing, Zapfendorf, and Ebensfeld were made accessible (platform height: 55 cm (22 in)). Accessibility was not initially planned due to a passenger volume of less than 1,000 boarding/alighting passengers per day. However, during the ongoing planning approval process, the federal government decided to finance the accessibility upgrade. The installation of lifts was considered separately under planning law, and the lifts went into operation in 2017.

During a complete closure planned from 26 to 29 March 2021, a new platform and new track system in Hallstadt were put into operation. Another complete closure followed from 1 to 5 December 2021, to connect the two new tracks at Hallstadt.

== Description of the route ==
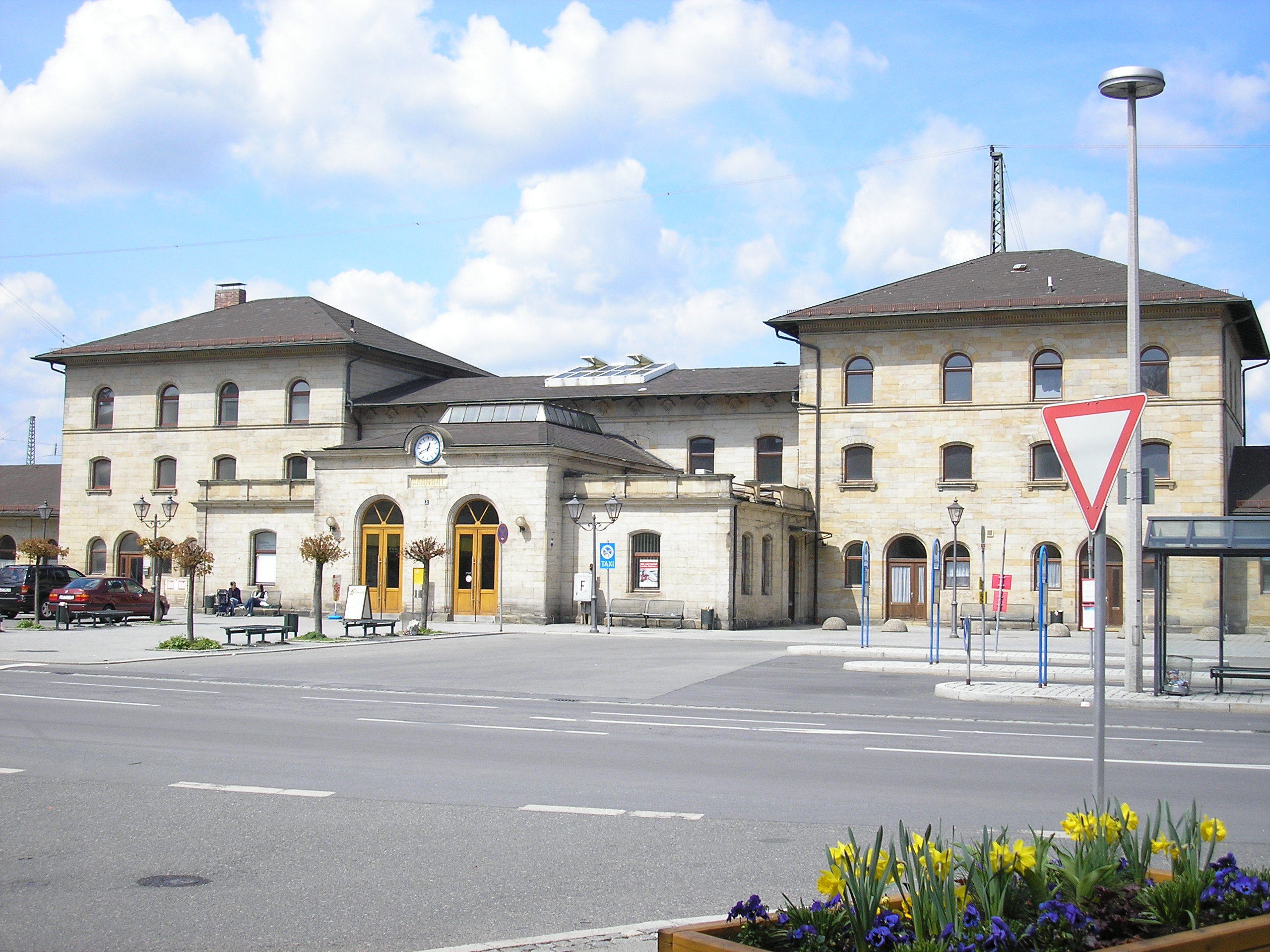
Station building at Lichtenfels

Shortly after the route leaves Bamberg station the branch line to Scheßlitz (now closed) branches off, as does the main line to Würzburg that runs parallel as far as the heights of Kleingartensiedlung and then swings away to the northwest. From the left, a link line from the Würzburg railway joins the route; which now passes under the A 70 motorway and runs past the western edge of Hallstadt and then parallel to the B 4 before reaching Breitengüßbach. After the station the branch line to Ebern branches off as well as the branch line to Dietersdorf – now closed and dismantled. The line passes under A 73 motorway and runs parallel to the river Main. Passing through the stations of Ebing, Zapfendorf, Ebensfeld (where in future the high-speed line to Erfurt will form a junction) and Bad Staffelstein, the line reaches Lichtenfels.

From Lichtenfels station the line follows the course of the Main as far as Mainleus. In Hochstadt-Marktzeuln the Franconian Forest Railway to Ludwigsstadt and Saalfeld turns off; and at Kulmbach the railway from Thurnau and Bayreuth branches off only a few metres away from where the Schlömener curve link line meets it. Beyond this, the line runs up the Schiefe Ebene to Marktschorgast station, from the end of which it becomes single-tracked as far as Stammbach. Passing Münchberg and Schwarzenbach an der Saale the line reaches Oberkotzau, is united there with the lines from Regensburg and Selb, runs past Moschendorf over the river Saale and finally arrives at the terminus of Hof Hauptbahnhof.

The line is doubled and electrified from Bamberg to Hochstadt-Marktzeuln. The remaining section to Hof is not electrified but, apart from the single-tracked section from Marktschorgast to Stammbach, is also doubled. The top speed applicable to the route is, in places, up to 160 km/h (99 mph).

== Operations ==
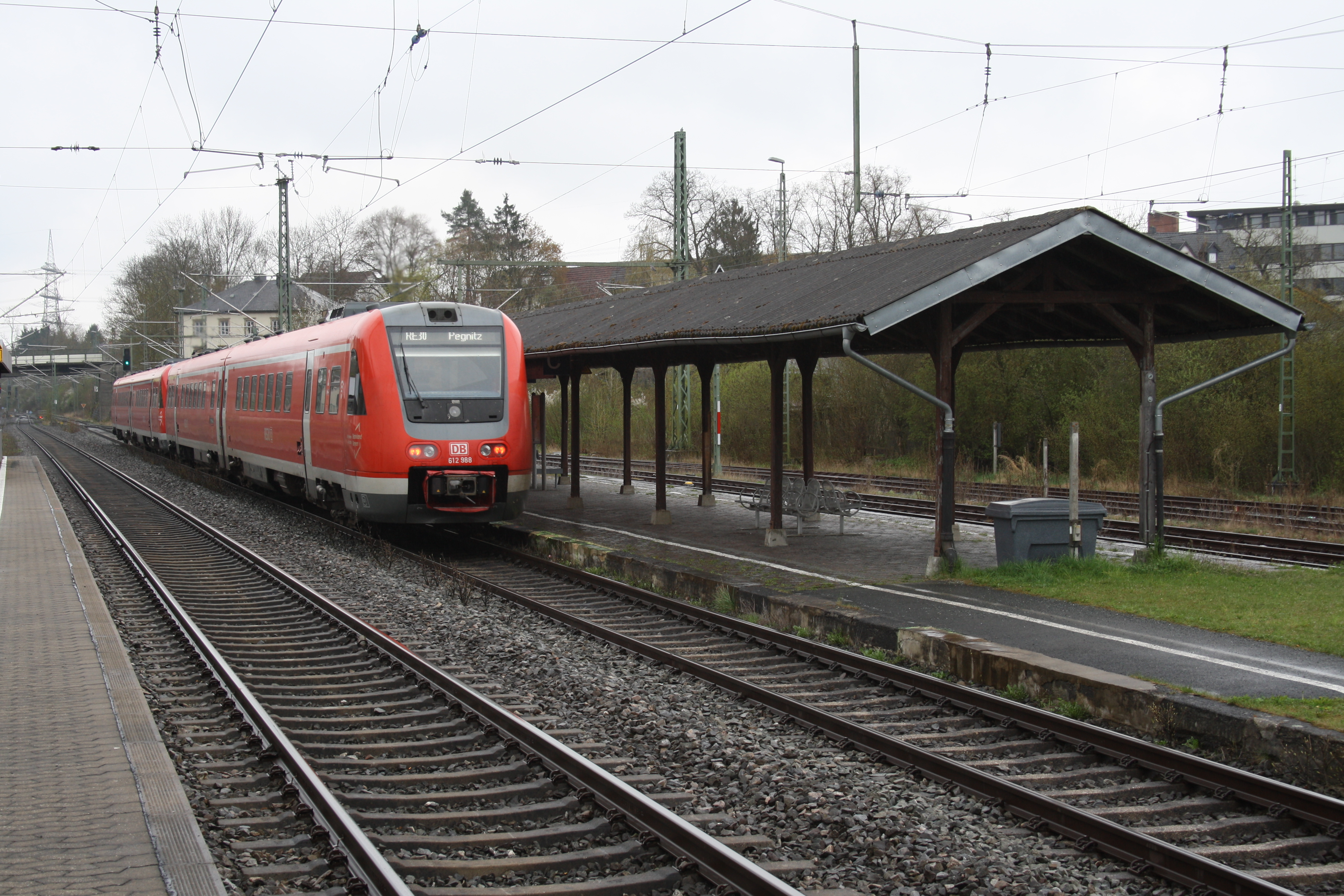
Two coupled tilting train trains of class 612 to Hof Hauptbahnhof (in the background) and Pegnitz (via Bayreuth Hauptbahnhof) in Hochstadt-Marktzeuln station

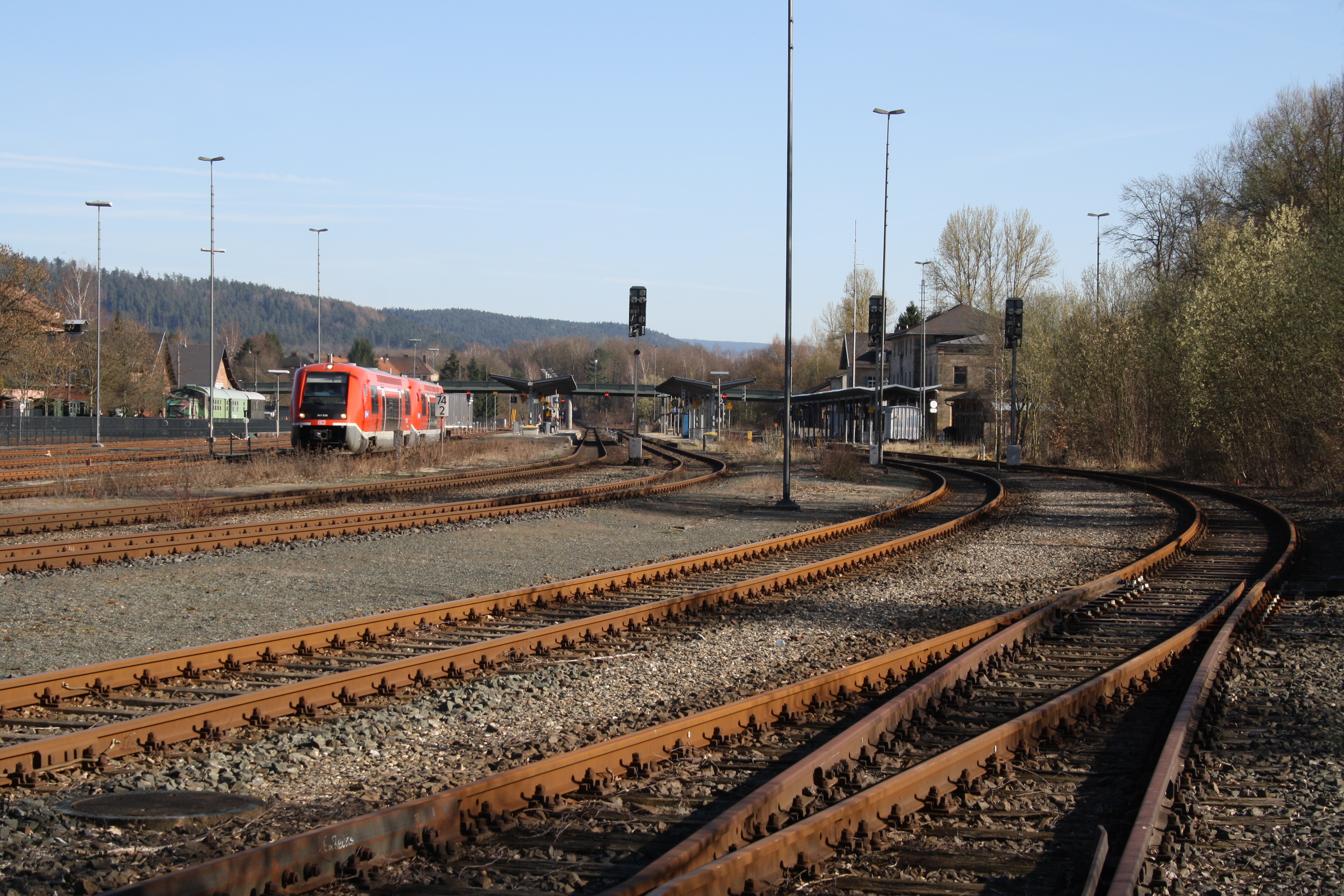
Neuenmarkt-Wirsberg station with two railcars of class 641 at the exit towards Bamberg, 2014

Until the timetable change in December 2017 and the subsequent transfer of long-distance services to the Nuremberg–Erfurt high-speed railway, Intercity Express trains on the Munich – Nuremberg – Leipzig – Berlin (– Hamburg ) line ran hourly on the route from Bamberg via Lichtenfels to Hochstadt-Marktzeuln. ICE T class 411 tilting trains were used.

In 2026, an IC line 61 service ran twice a day from Leipzig to Karlsruhe, stopping in Bamberg and Lichtenfels. At night, an ICE line 18 train pair served the line nightly between Berlin and Munich, also stopping in Bamberg and Lichtenfels.

On the Bamberg–Lichtenfels section, Regional-Express (RE) trains of the Franken-Thüringen-Express runs hourly from Nuremberg to Saalfeld/Saale via Bamberg, Lichtenfels, and Kronach (RE 14). Every two hours, this train runs with a section to Sonneberg via Coburg (RE 28), which is separated from the RE 14 in Lichtenfels. Additionally, an RE train runs every two hours between Bamberg, Lichtenfels, and Hof / Bayreuth. This service is supplemented by the hourly Regionalbahn (RB) line between Bamberg, Lichtenfels, and Kronach.

The Regional Express trains to Sonneberg/Saalfeld consist of Siemens Desiro HC multiple units (class 1462) approved for speeds of up to 160 km/h (99 mph). Due to the tight curves on the Schiefe Ebene (a steep, incline) and the non-electrified sections between Hochstadt-Marktzeuln and Hof/Bayreuth, the Bamberg–Hof/Bayreuth line is served by diesel-powered tilting trains of class 612, which are split or joined at the Neuenmarkt–Wirsberg station. Since December 2013, the class 612 trains have only operated every two hours between Lichtenfels and Bayreuth/Hof. During the other hour, class 641 trains run between Bamberg and Bayreuth/Hof. This ended the direct connection between Würzburg and Bayreuth/Hof in Bamberg, which had been in operation until December 2013, as Class 425 electric multiple units took over the services previously provided by class 612 between Bamberg and Würzburg.

Since 2011, the railway company Agilis has been operating the following lines on the Bamberg–Hof railway line as the winner of the tender issued by the Bavarian Railway Company:

- from Ebern via Breitengüßbach to Bamberg (hourly service)
- from Bad Rodach via Lichtenfels and Neuenmarkt-Wirsberg to Weiden (hourly service)
- from Helmbrechts via Münchberg and Hof Hbf to Bad Steben (two-hourly service)
- Bamberg – Lichtenfels (some trains)
- Kulmbach – Münchberg (some trains)
- Since December 2012 also Hof – Marktredwitz (some trains).

Regional-Express trains run between Nuremberg and Hof via Bayreuth on the line between Marktschorgast and Hof.

== See also ==
- Ludwig South-North Railway
