= Wiesau–Cheb railway =

Former railway line in Germany and the Czech Republic

Wiesau–Waldsassen–Eger railway
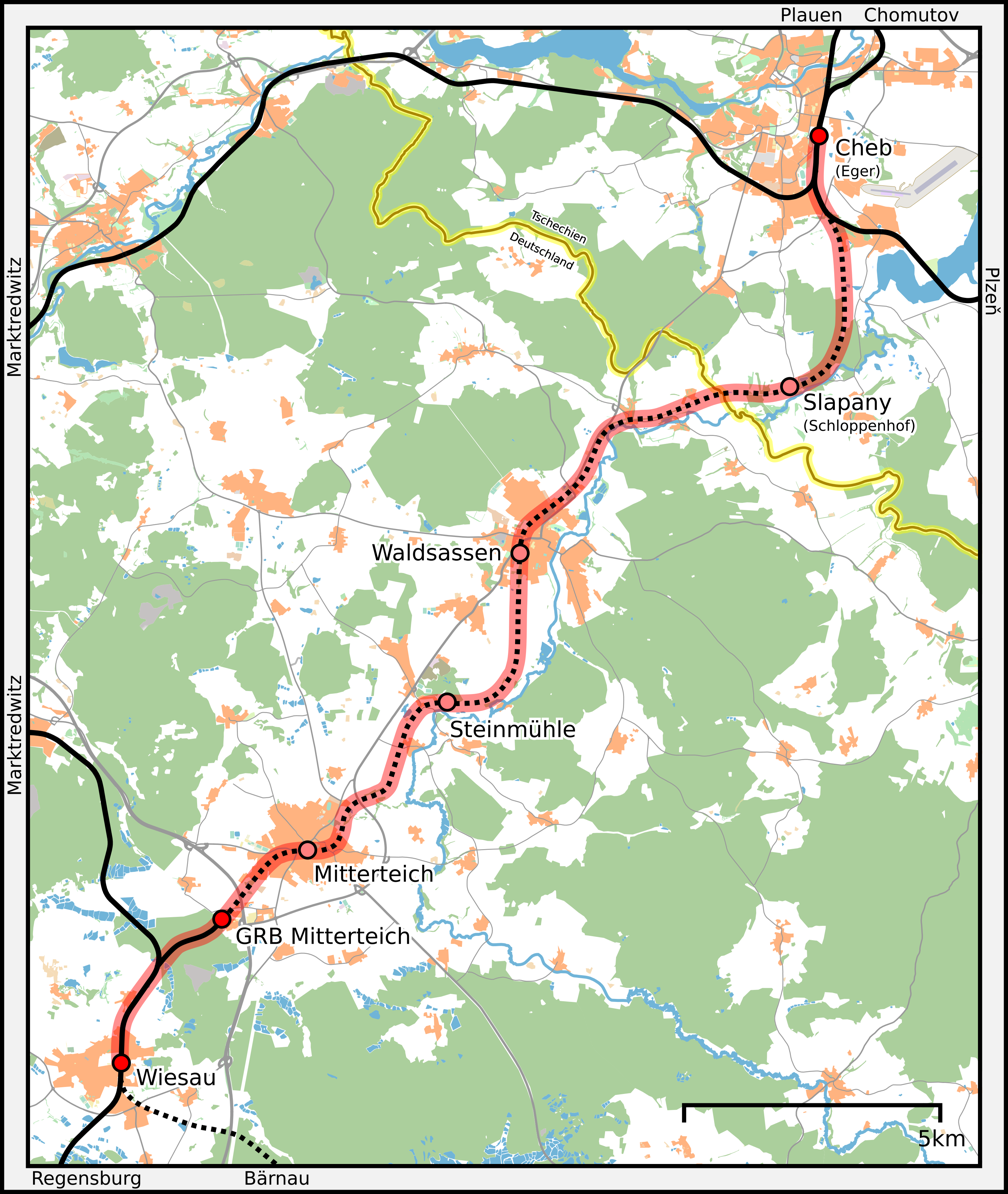

Overview
- Line number: 5040
- Locale: Bavaria, Germany, Czech Republic

Service
- Route number: ex 855

Technical
- Line length: 26.5 km (16.5 mi)
- Track gauge: 1,435 mm (4 ft 8 1/2 in) standard gauge

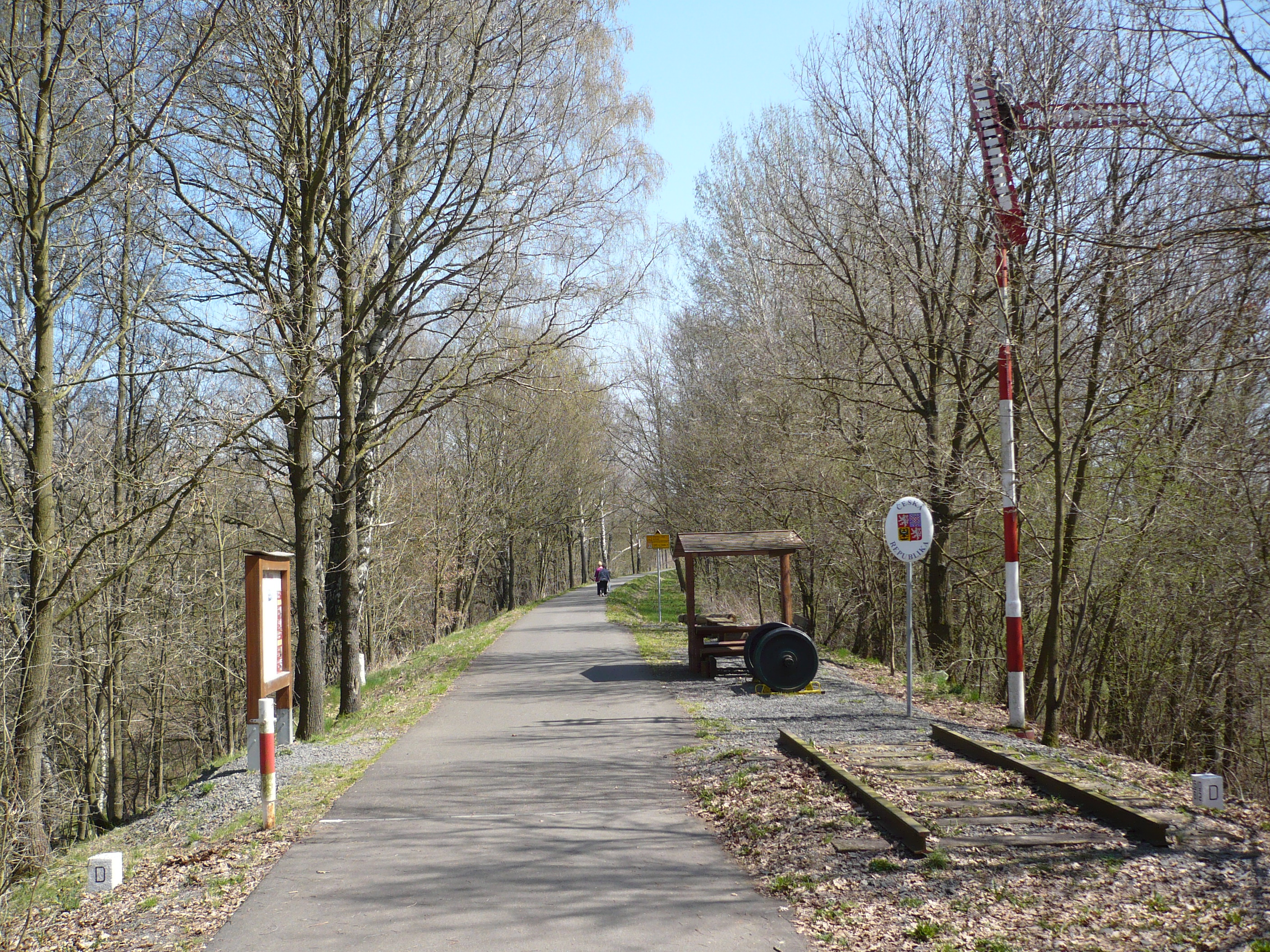
Cycleway on route of Wiesau–Cheb railway near border

The Wiesau–Cheb railway was a major railway in the German state of Bavaria and the Czech Republic, which was originally part of the main line connecting Regensburg, Weiden and Eger (now Cheb), which was built and operated by the Bavarian Eastern Railway Company (German: Bavarian Ostbahn). In 1945 the line was closed at the border and since 2000 it has been closed completely except for a 3.6 km section.

== History ==
The Bavarian Eastern Railway opened the section from Weiden via Wiesau to Mitterteich on 15 August 1864 as part of its north–south line and 15 October 1865 this was followed by the section to the junction at Eger, which at that time was in the Austrian Empire. The line was always single-track and it lost some of its importance on 1 June 1882 when the Bavarian State Railways opened the Marktredwitz-Wiesau connection of the Weiden–Oberkotzau railway, but trains ran on the line until the First World War.

The foundation of Czechoslovakia in 1919/20 led to more formalities at the border, which runs east of Waldsassen, near Schloppenhof (now Slapany). From Waldsassen station, only passenger trains were allowed to operate to and from Cheb. The track in Germany was taken over by the newly established Deutsche Reichsbahn (German Imperial Railways). After the annexation of the Sudetenland by Germany in 1938 the route was served by a fast train from Munich to Carlsbad (now Karlovy Vary).

After the end of the Second World War in May 1945, the line was permanently closed to traffic at the border. Rail services between Cheb and Slapany were maintained until 1967. The line in Bavaria continued to be operated for forty years.

On 30 May 1986 Deutsche Bundesbahn closed passenger services, which at times had had more than ten pairs of trains per day. Freight operations ended to Waldsassen on 10 October 1994 and to Mitterteich officially on 1 January 2000. The Federal Railway Authority (Eisenbahn-Bundesamt) approved the closure of the Mitterteich–Waldsassen section on 1 August 1995 and it took place on 5 November 1995. On 31 January 2000 this was followed by approval for the closure of part of the Wiesau–Mitterteich section from 3.6 km from Mitterteich and this was completed on 19 March 2000.

The remaining 3.6 km section from Wiesau to the siding of GRB Mitterteich (a nuclear waste storage facility) was converted into a siding to Wiesau station on 31 December 2000 and will continue to be used for freight as required by DB Schenker Rail Deutschland.

== Quarry railway ==
A 700 mm gauge Feldbahn railway was operated from the Steinmühle station by Bayerische Basalt AG to a quarry. After the end of basalt production the railway was closed on 31 October 1984.
