= Weiden–Oberkotzau railway =

Two-track main line railway in Bavaria, Germany

Overview
- Status: Operational
- Owner: Deutsche Bahn
- Line number: 5050
- Locale: Bavaria
- Termini: Regensburg; Weiden

Service
- Type: Heavy rail, Passenger rail Regional rail
- Route number: 855

History
- Opened: 1864, 1877, 1878, 1882

Technical
- Line length: 87.020 km (54.072 mi)
- Number of tracks: 2
- Track gauge: 1,435 mm (4 ft 8 1/2 in) standard gauge
- Operating speed: 160 km/h (99 mph)

The Weiden–Oberkotzau railway is a two-track main line railway in Bavaria, Germany. It connects with the Regensburg–Weiden railway in Weiden in der Oberpfalz and runs via Marktredwitz to Oberkotzau, where it joins the Bamberg–Hof railway. The line forms part of a long-distance route from Munich to Hof, continuing to Leipzig and Dresden.

== History ==
The line was opened in several sections. The section from Weiden to Wiesau was built by the Bavarian Eastern Railway Company (Bayerischen Ostbahnen) as part of a connection from Regensburg to Cheb (German: Eger) and operated by it until it was nationalised in 1876.

The section from Weiden via Wiesau and continuing to Mitterteich was opened to traffic on 15 August 1864. After the opening of the link from Mitterteich to Cheb on 15 October 1865 and the opening of the link from Hof to Cheb on 1 November 1865, it was possible to travel by train from Regensburg to Hof—but only with the detour via Cheb, which is located in Bohemia and at that time belonged to the Austro-Hungarian Empire and is now in the Czech Republic.

A connection was opened to Markt Redwitz on 15 August 1877. The Markt Redwitz—Nuremberg section of the Nuremberg–Cheb railway was opened on 15 August 1878. This line was extended to Cheb in 1883. The gap between Wiesau and Marktredwitz on Bavarian territory was closed on 1 June 1882, completing the current Weiden–Hof route.

Opening dates

- Weiden–Wiesau (–Cheb): 15 August 1864
- Holenbrunn–Oberkotzau: 15 August 1877
- Marktredwitz–Holenbrunn: 15 May 1878
- Wiesau–Marktredwitz: 1 June 1882

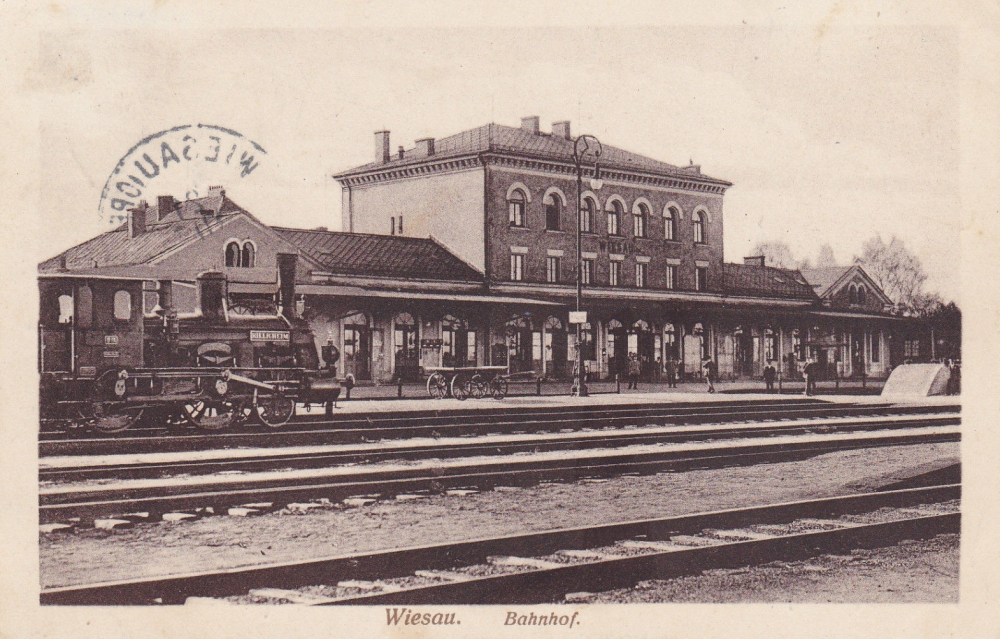
Wiesau station in about 1900

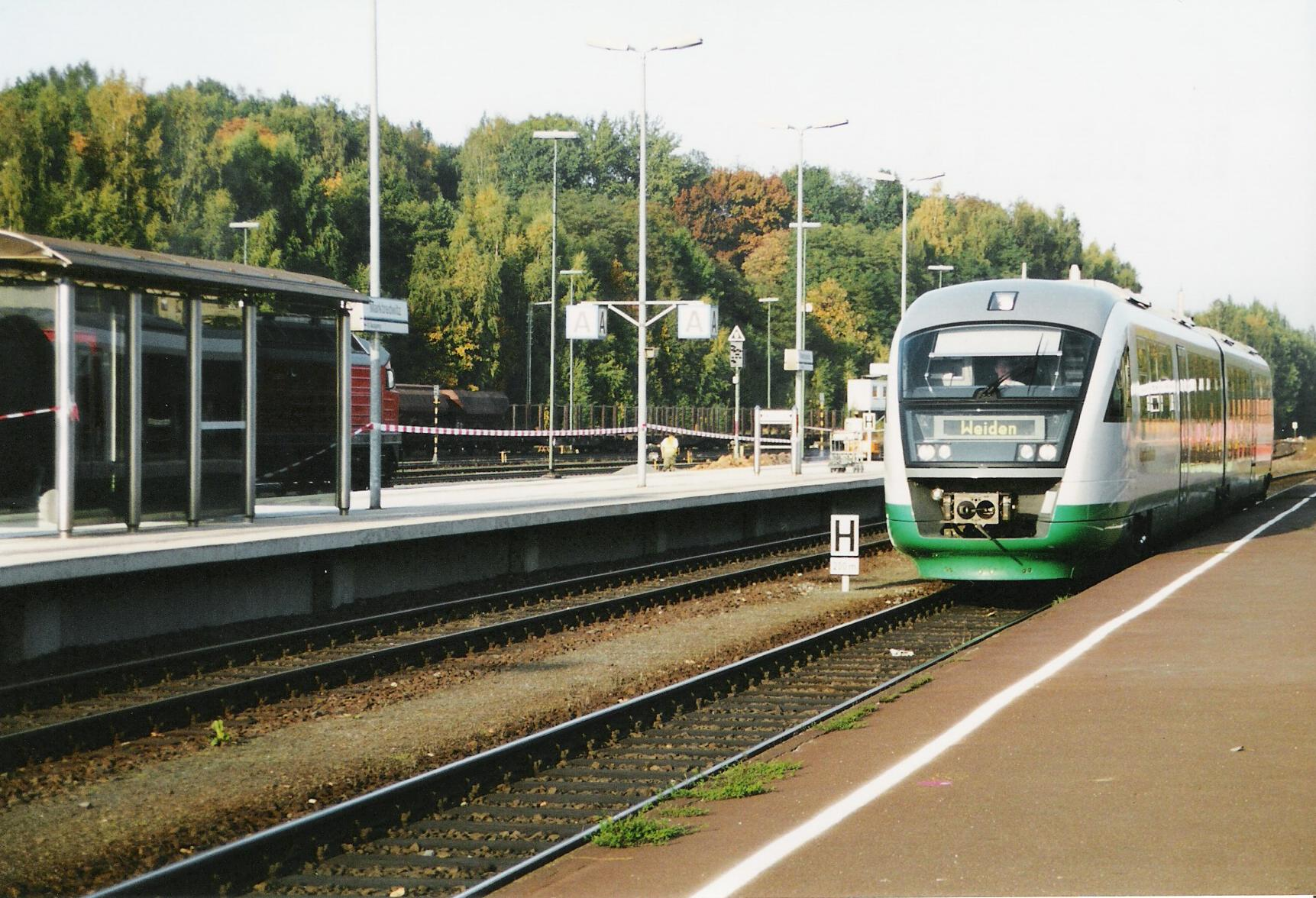
Vogtlandbahn Desiro in Marktredwitz station (2001)

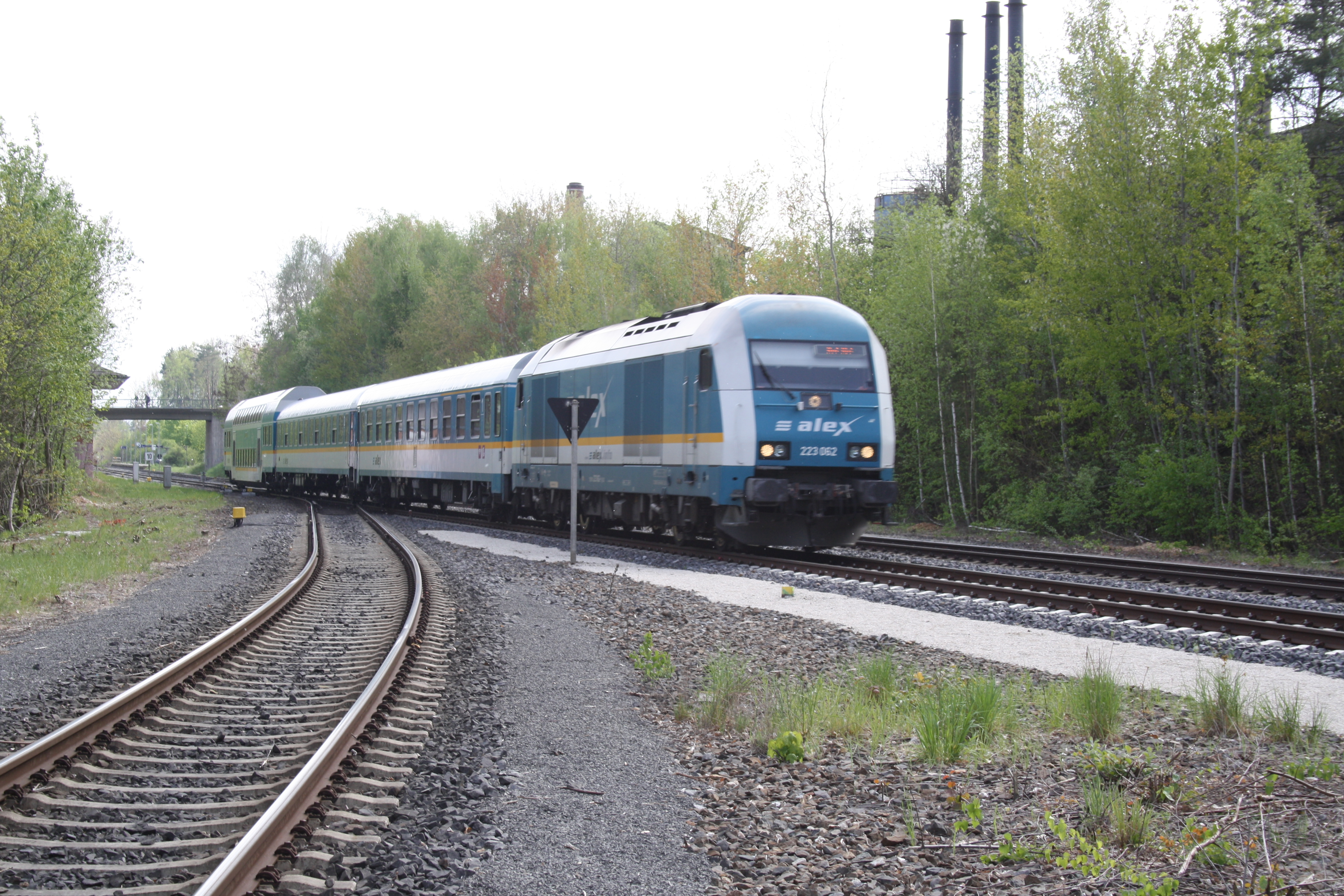
alex service from Munich to Hof near Neustadt (Waldnaab) (2019)

The line was single-track until 1900. The duplication of the line caused problems in Groschlattengrün station, which was located in the village of Pechbrunn next to the local basalt works and could not be moved. On 30 and 31 October 1900, the entrance building was therefore removed from its foundations, raised by four centimetres and moved by ten metres. During this work, operations continued, even in the station building, without any significant interruptions.

There was a serious railway accident at the southern entrance to Marktredwitz station on 9 July 1939. A D 25 express from Munich to Berlin Anhalter Bahnhof continued over the Drei-Bögen-Brücke (three-arch bridge) into stationary freight wagons, which had detached from a preceding freight train. The train’s two locomotives, Prussian P 8 38 2145 and 38 2401, and the first carriages of the train were derailed and fell from the bridge.

Until the end of the Second World War, the line was part of the most important long-distance route in southern Germany, connecting Munich, Dresden and Wrocław (German: Breslau). In the 1939 summer timetable, a total of eleven express trains ran on the line. In addition to express trains from Munich to Dresden, Wroclaw and continuing to the Upper Silesian city of Bytom (German: Beuthen), long-distance trains ran on the Vienna–Leipzig–Hamburg, Berchtesgaden–Berlin/Dresden and Rome–Munich–Leipzig–Berlin routes.

The Regionalbahn services on the whole line were formerly operated by Oberpfalzbahn of the Die Länderbahn (formerly Vogtlandbahn) with Siemens Desiro diesel railcars. The Regionalbahn services on the Marktredwitz–Hof section were reassigned as part of the Dieselnetz Oberfranken (Upper Franconia diesel network) tendered by Bayerische Eisenbahngesellschaft on 8 February 2008.

agilis took over operations of the Regionalbahn services In December 2012. This allowed an increase in services, including a continuous Hof–Marktredwitz Regionalbahn service.

== Route description ==
The line runs from Weiden along the Waldnaab and Fichtelnaab rivers via Neustadt an der Waldnaab, Windischeschenbach, Reuth bei Erbendorf to Wiesau, passes by the Steinwald range on its east side and connects with the line from Nuremberg, running from the west, in Marktredwitz station. Between Weiden and Marktredwitz, four lines once branched off from the line: in Neustadt, the line to Eslarn, in Reuth, the line to Erbendorf and in Wiesau the line from Bärnau and the line to Cheb via Waldsassen. A 600 mm gauge field railway (Feldbahn), the Reuth–Friedenfels railway, also began in Reuth, which ran to the town of Friedenfels about six kilometres away.

A line branches off from Marktredwitz to Schirnding and Cheb. This line continues north through the towns of Holenbrunn, Röslau and Marktleuthen and crosses the eastern foothills of the Fichtelgebirge on its way to Hof. From Fattigau, the line runs parallel to the Saale and the line from Bamberg, which it joins at Oberkotzau station.

== Bibliography ==
- Bräunlein, Manfred (2000). Die Ostbahnen (in German). Nuremberg: Lorenz Spindler. ISBN 3-88929-078-7.
- Ernstberger, Michael (2005). Nordbayerische Feld- und Grubenbahnen und die Geschichte ihrer Betriebe (in German) (1 ed.).
- Eisenbahnatlas Deutschland [German railway atlas]. Schweers + Wall. 2017. ISBN 978-3-89494-146-8.
