= Ebensfeld =

- Municipality
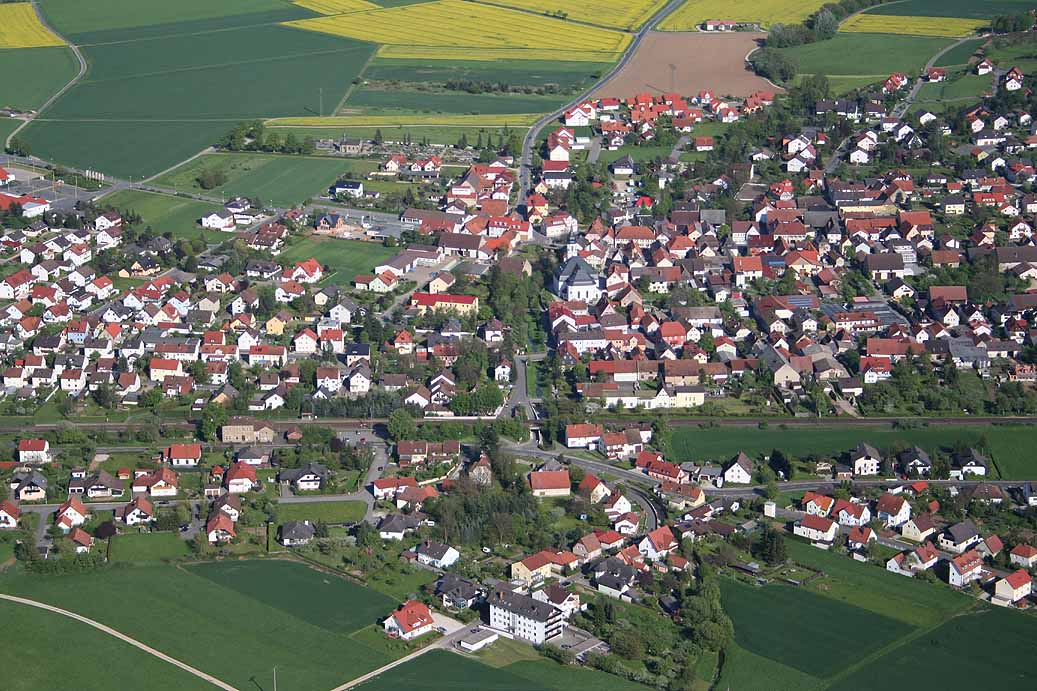
- Aerial view

- Coat of arms

- Location of Ebensfeld within Lichtenfels district
- Interactive map of Ebensfeld
- Location within Germany Location within Bavaria
- Coordinates: 50°04′N 10°57′E
- Country: Germany
- State: Bavaria
- Admin. region: Oberfranken
- District: Lichtenfels

Government
  - Mayor (2020–26): Bernhard Storath (CSU)

Area
  - Total: 68.72 km^{2} (26.53 sq mi)
- Elevation: 255 m (837 ft)

Population (2025-12-31)
  - Total: 5,630
  - Density: 81.9/km^{2} (212/sq mi)
- Time zone: UTC+01:00 (CET)
  - Summer (DST): UTC+02:00 (CEST)
- Postal codes: 96250
- Dialling codes: 09573
- Vehicle registration: LIF
- Website: www.ebensfeld.de

Ebensfeld (German pronunciation: [ˈeːbn̩sˌfɛlt]) is a municipality in the district of Lichtenfels in Bavaria in Germany. It lies on the river Main.

== Sons and daughters of the town ==
- Georg Meixner (1887–1960), German Catholic priest and Bavarian politician

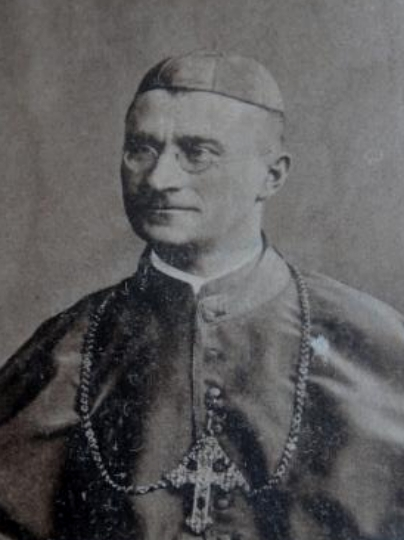
Adam Senger ca 1920

- Rudolf Lunkenbein (1939–1976), German Salesian and missionary in Brazil
- Johann Andreas Seelmann (1732–1789), was from 1771 until his death Bishop in the Diocese of Speyer
- Johann Baptist Dietz (1879–1959), was a Roman Catholic theologian and 1939-1958 Bishop of the diocese Fulda
- Adam Senger (1860–1935), was auxiliary bishop of Bamberg
