= Cheb–Oberkotzau railway =

Railway line in Bavaria, Germany and the Czech Republic

Cheb–Aš–Selb-Plößberg–Oberkotzau

Overview
- Line number: 5027

Service
- Route number: 858 (Germany); 148 (Czech Republic)

Technical
- Line length: 54.8 km (34.1 mi)
- Track gauge: 1,435 mm (4 ft 8 1/2 in)
- Electrification: Cheb–Františkovy Lázně: 25 kV, 50 Hz AC

The Cheb–Oberkotzau railway is a railway line in Bavaria, Germany, and the Czech Republic which was built as a main line. It begins in Cheb and runs via Františkovy Lázně, Aš and Selb to Oberkotzau. The line was originally planned as a direct railway link between Cheb and Hof; but the plan was changed so that the existing Ludwig South-North Railway between Oberkotzau and Hof was shared. The section Aš–Selb-Plößberg was closed during the Cold War, but rebuilt and reopened in 2015.

== History ==
=== Early days ===
The city of Hof tried as early as 1845 to be linked to the newly emerging railway network. The priority was to create a direct link to the west Bohemian coal mines so that the local industry could be better supported and supplied.

Because the Kingdom of Bavaria did not at first want to build such a link itself, another solution was sought. The city of Hof took out a loan from the Royal Bank in Nuremberg of more than 10 million German gold marks and was granted the concession; it handed over the construction of the line to the factory owner Theodor von Cramer-Klett. Operation of the line was leased to Royal Bavarian State Railways after the line had been finished. Because more than half the railway ran through Bohemian territory, the agreement between Bavaria and Austria was concluded on 17 June 1863.

=== Construction ===
Between Cheb and Františkovy Lázně the trackbed was shared with the Saxon line from Herlasgrün to Cheb (Voigtland State Railway). Operationally both lines were independently classed as main lines along this section. From Františkovy Lázně the line ran via Aš, Selb and Rehau to Oberkotzau, where it joined the Ludwig South-North Railway (Bamberg–Hof railway). For topographical reasons the line could not be routed directly to Hof.

The new line was opened on 1 November 1865. It was to have transferred after 57 years, in 1922, for nothing to the ownership of the Bavarian State after the bank loan had been paid off. The annual rent 279,000 Bavarian gulden. However the transfer of the concession was legally approved as early as 1919.

=== Operation ===
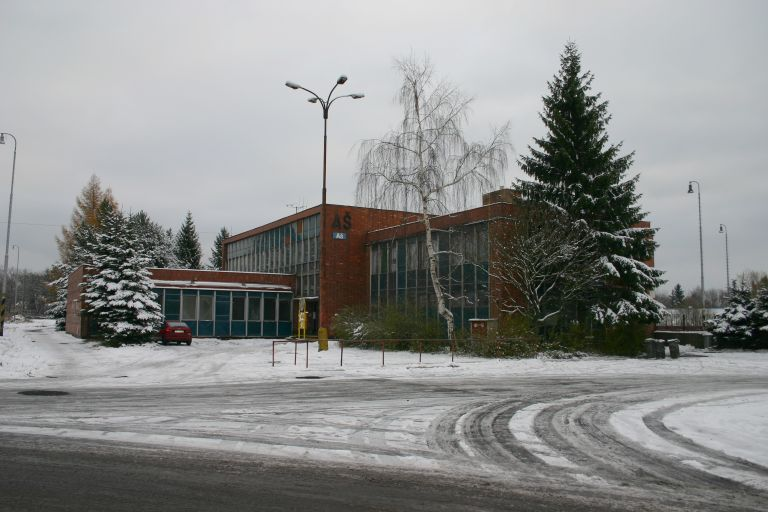
Aš station

Initially all traffic ran from Hof over the Hof–Cheb line and on southwards to Regensburg and Munich. In 1877 when the Bavarian State Railway opened a direct line from Hof via Marktredwitz to Regensburg, the level of traffic fell. Nevertheless, the line was exceptionally important in providing the industries around Hof with Bohemian coal.

After the World War II the section of the railway on the territory of Czechoslovakia was transferred without compensation to the Czechoslovak State Railways (ČSD). Through passenger services from Hof to Cheb were no longer operated. Passenger trains from the direction of Hof ran through to Selb Stadt station. From now on the ČSD ran its passenger trains from Aš through on the former Aš–Adorf local line to Hranice v Čechách. The whole line remained open for goods traffic, because the porcelain industry in Bavaria was dependent on supplies of raw materials from Bohemia.

In the 1970s the German section of line from Selb via Plößberg to Oberkotzau was downgraded to a branch line. In the Czech Republic the track is still classified today as a main line.

In the 1990s the Hof–Cheb railway was cut on the Bavarian side by a ring road around the town of Selb and the section from Selb to Plößberg and the border was officially closed on 29 September 1996. As a result, rail traffic from Hof via Aš to Cheb was no longer possible. In 2015 the line to Aš was reconstructed and reopened in December 2015.

== Prospects ==
The section of line in Germany is part of the Upper Franconian Diesel Network (Dieselnetz Oberfranken) tendered by the Bayerische Eisenbahngesellschaft on 8 February 2008 and which should offer improved services from 12 June 2011 with new vehicles.

== Sources ==
- Hans Kundmann: Eger einst – Schirnding heute. Grenzbahnhöfe der Fichtelgebirgsbahn. Herausgeber: MEC Model Eisenbahnclub/Hofer Eisenbahnfreunde e.V., Hof 1983
- Arthur from Mayer: Geschichte and Geographie der deutschen Eisenbahnen. Berlin 1891
- Zdeněk Hudec u.a.: Atlas drah České Republiky 2006-2007, 2. Auflage; Verlag Pavel Malkus, Praha, 2006, ISBN 80-87047-00-1.
