= Oberkotzau =

- Municipality
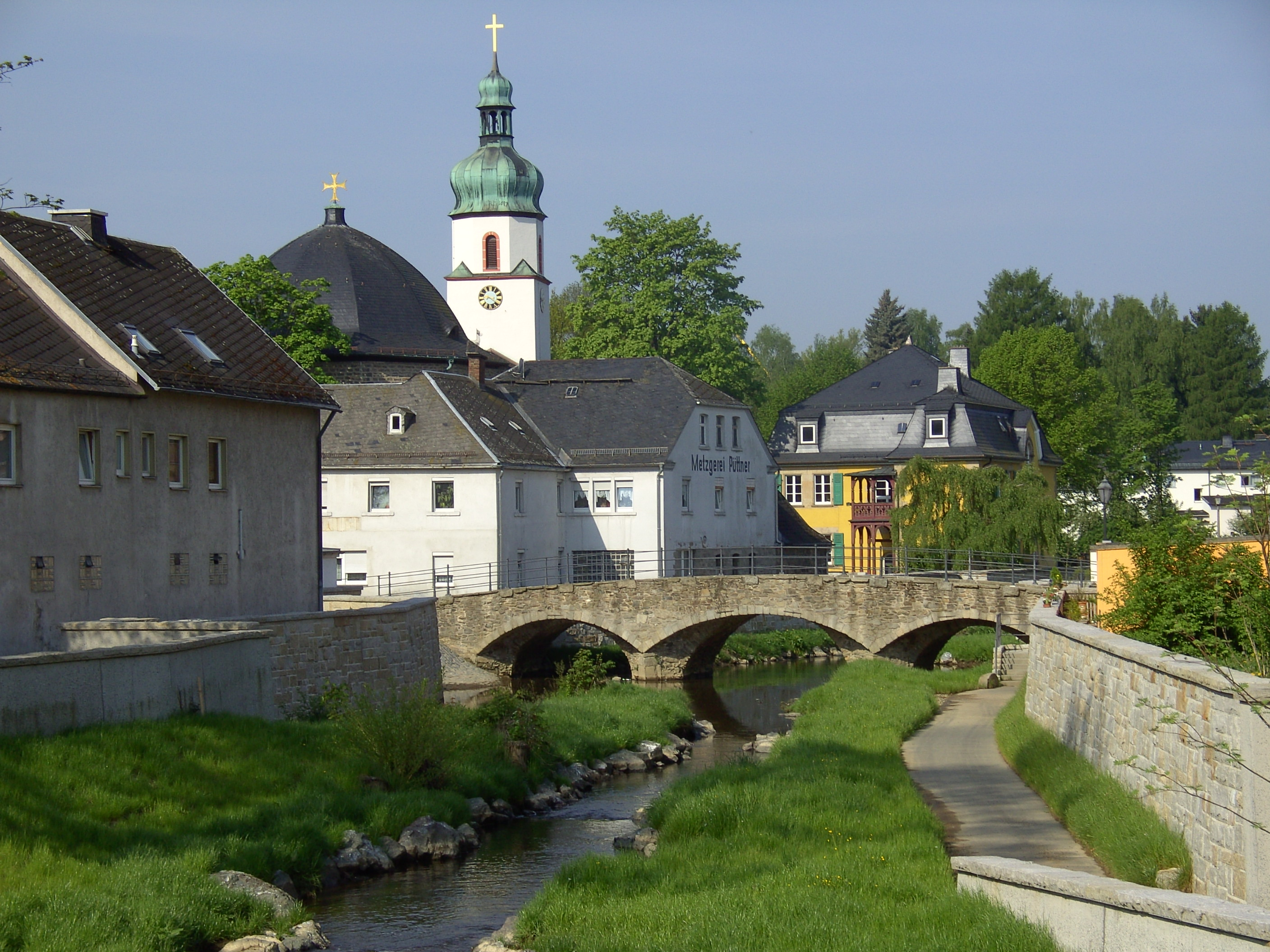
- Schwesnitz River in Oberkotzau with the Protestant Church of Saint James in the background

- Coat of arms

- Location of Oberkotzau within Hof district
- Interactive map of Oberkotzau
- Location within Germany Location within Bavaria
- Coordinates: 50°15′45.00″N 11°56′00.00″E
- Country: Germany
- State: Bavaria
- Admin. region: Oberfranken
- District: Hof
- Subdivisions: 7 Ortsteile

Government
  - Mayor (2020–26): Stefan Breuer (CSU)

Area
  - Total: 21.51 km^{2} (8.31 sq mi)
- Elevation: 484 m (1,588 ft)

Population (2025-12-31)
  - Total: 5,249
  - Density: 244.0/km^{2} (632.0/sq mi)
- Time zone: UTC+01:00 (CET)
  - Summer (DST): UTC+02:00 (CEST)
- Postal codes: 95145
- Dialling codes: 09286
- Vehicle registration: HO
- Website: www.oberkotzau.de

Oberkotzau (German pronunciation: [oːbɐˈkɔtsaʊ]) is a municipality in Upper Franconia in the district of Hof in Bavaria in Germany.
