= Selb-Plößberg station =

Railway station in Selb, Germany

Selb-Plößberg
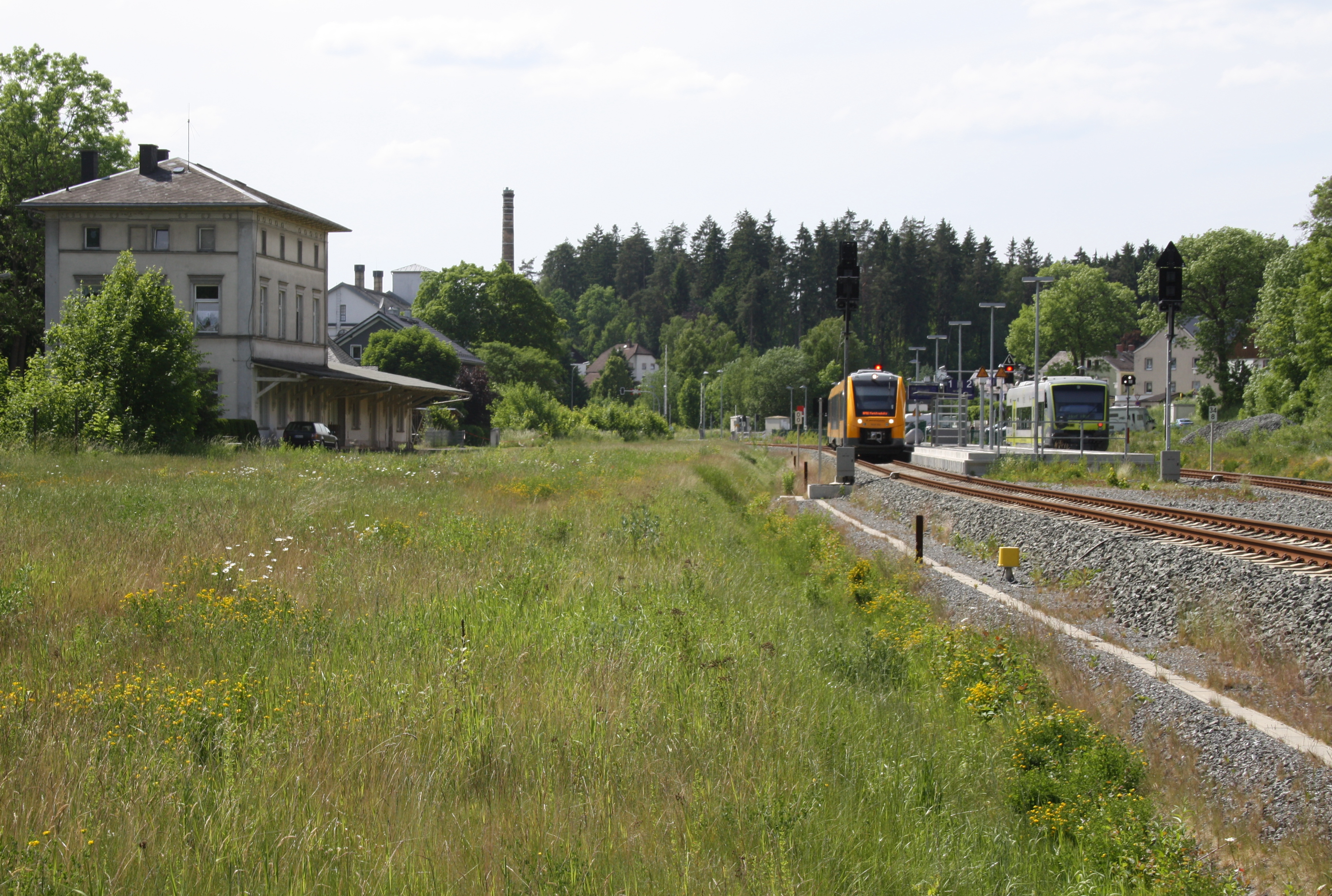
- 2019

General information
- Location: Bahnhofstraße; 95100 Selb-Plößberg; Bavaria; Germany
- Coordinates: 50.1892°N 12.1198°E
- Elevation: 623 m (2,044 ft)
- System: Bf
- Owner: Deutsche Bahn
- Operator: DB Station&Service
- Lines: Cheb–Oberkotzau railway (KBS 858); Holenbrunn–Selb railway (KBS 858)
- Platforms: 1 island platform
- Tracks: 2
- Train operators: agilis
- Connections: RB

Construction
- Parking: yes
- Cycle facilities: no
- Accessible: yes

Other information
- Station code: 5812
- DS100 code: NSP
- IBNR: 8005518
- Category: 7
- Website: www.bahnhof.de

Services
Preceding station		Following station
Schönwald (Oberfr) towards Hof-Neuhof or Gutenfürst	RB 95	Aš towards Marktredwitz
Schönwald (Oberfr) towards Hof Hbf	RB 96	Erkersreuth towards Selb Stadt
Location
- Location within Bavaria Location within Germany Location within Europe

Selb-Plößberg station is a railway station in the municipality of Selb, located in the Wunsiedel district in Bavaria, Germany.
