= Schönwald (Oberfr) station =

Train station in Schönwald, Bavaria, Germany

Schönwald (Oberfr)
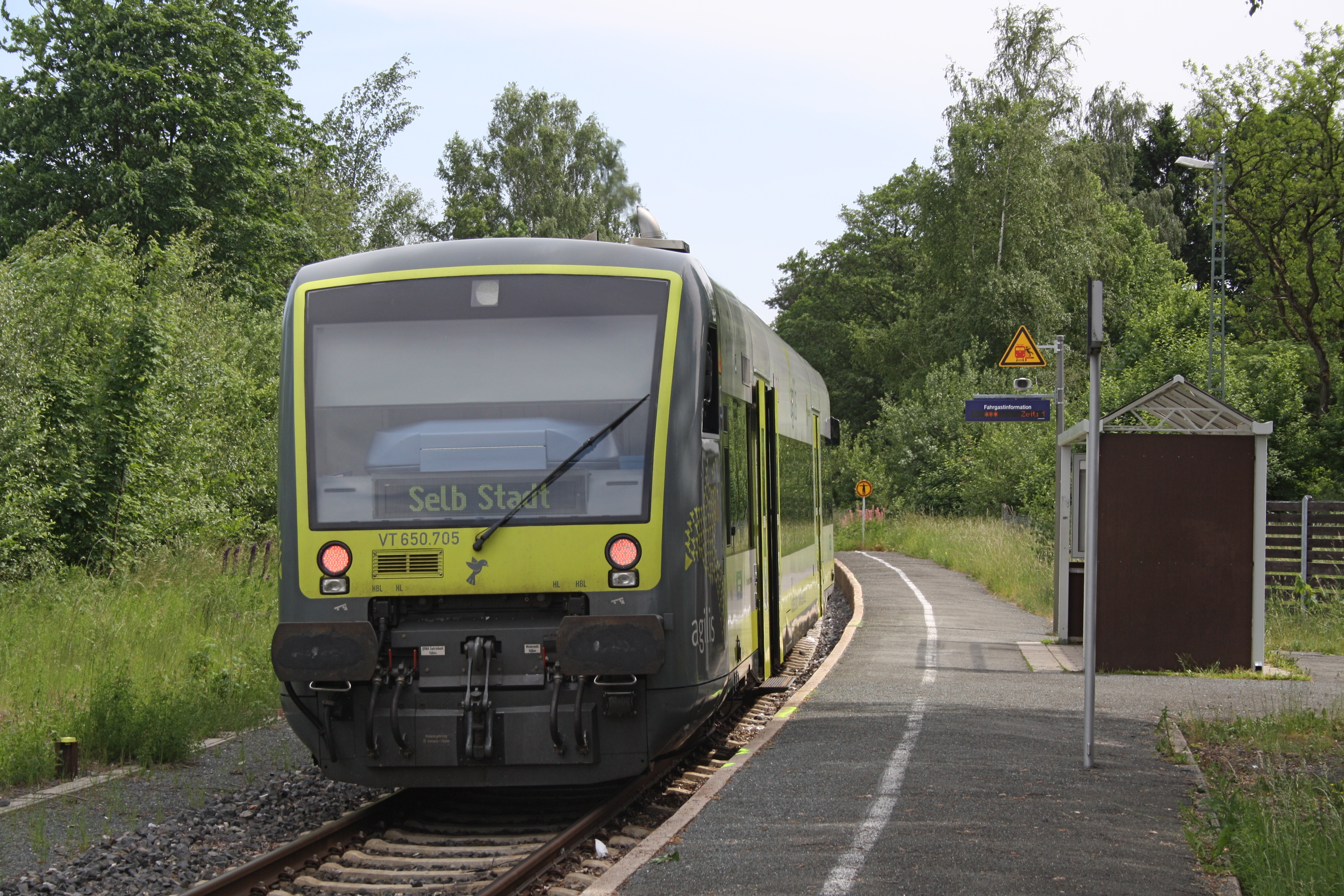
- 2019

General information
- Location: Am Bahnhof; 95173 Schönwald; Bavaria; Germany
- Coordinates: 50.1992°N 12.0965°E
- Elevation: 609 m (1,998 ft)
- System: Hp
- Owner: Deutsche Bahn
- Operator: DB Station&Service
- Lines: Cheb–Oberkotzau railway (KBS 858)
- Platforms: 1 side platform
- Tracks: 1
- Train operators: agilis
- Connections: RB

Construction
- Parking: yes
- Cycle facilities: no
- Accessible: yes

Other information
- Station code: 5673
- DS100 code: NSOE
- IBNR: 8005412
- Category: 7
- Website: www.bahnhof.de

Services
Preceding station		Following station
Rehau towards Hof-Neuhof or Gutenfürst	RB 95	Selb-Plößberg towards Marktredwitz
Rehau towards Hof Hbf	RB 96	Selb-Plößberg towards Selb Stadt
Location
- Location within Bavaria Location within Germany Location within Europe

Schönwald (Oberfr) station is a railway station in the municipality of Schönwald, located in the Wunsiedel district in Bavaria, Germany.
