= Selb Nord station =

Railway station in Selb, Bavaria, Germany

Selb Nord

General information
- Location: Am Nordbahnhof; 95100 Selb; Bavaria; Germany
- Coordinates: 50.1788°N 12.1345°E
- System: Hp
- Owner: Deutsche Bahn
- Operator: DB Station&Service
- Lines: Holenbrunn–Selb railway (KBS 858)
- Platforms: 1 side platform
- Tracks: 1
- Train operators: agilis
- Connections: RB

Construction
- Parking: no
- Cycle facilities: no
- Accessible: yes

Other information
- Station code: 5810
- DS100 code: NSN
- IBNR: 8005516
- Category: 7
- Website: www.bahnhof.de

Services
Preceding station		Following station
Erkersreuth towards Hof Hbf	RB 96	Selb Stadt Terminus
Location
- Location within Bavaria Location within Germany Location within Europe

Selb Nord station is a railway station in the municipality of Selb, located in the Wunsiedel district in Bavaria, Germany.
