= Feilitzsch station =

Railway station in Feilitzsch, Germany

Feilitzsch

General information
- Location: Hauptstraße; 95183 Feilitzsch; Bavaria; Germany
- Coordinates: 50.3644°N 11.9341°E
- System: Bf
- Owner: Deutsche Bahn
- Operator: DB Netz; DB Station&Service
- Lines: Leipzig–Hof railway (KBS 544)
- Platforms: 2 side platforms
- Tracks: 2
- Train operators: Erfurter Bahn; Vogtlandbahn agilis Mitteldeutsche Regiobahn

Construction
- Parking: yes
- Cycle facilities: yes
- Accessible: yes

Other information
- Station code: 1769
- DS100 code: NFZ
- IBNR: 8001969
- Category: 6
- Website: www.bahnhof.de

Services
Preceding station		Following station
Hof Hbf Terminus	RB 13	Schönberg (Vogtl) towards Leipzig Hbf
Preceding station	Vogtlandbahn	Following station
Hof Hbf Terminus	RB 2	Gutenfürst towards Zwickau Zentrum
Preceding station		Following station
Hof Hbf towards Rehau	RB 95	Gutenfürst Terminus
Hof Hbf One-way operation	RB 99 Limited service	Gutenfürst Terminus
Preceding station	Mitteldeutsche Regiobahn	Following station
Hof Hbf Terminus	RE 3 Limited service	Mehltheuer One-way operation
Location
- Location within Bavaria Location within Germany Location within Europe

Feilitzsch station is a railway station in the municipality of Feilitzsch, located in the Hof district in Bavaria, Germany.

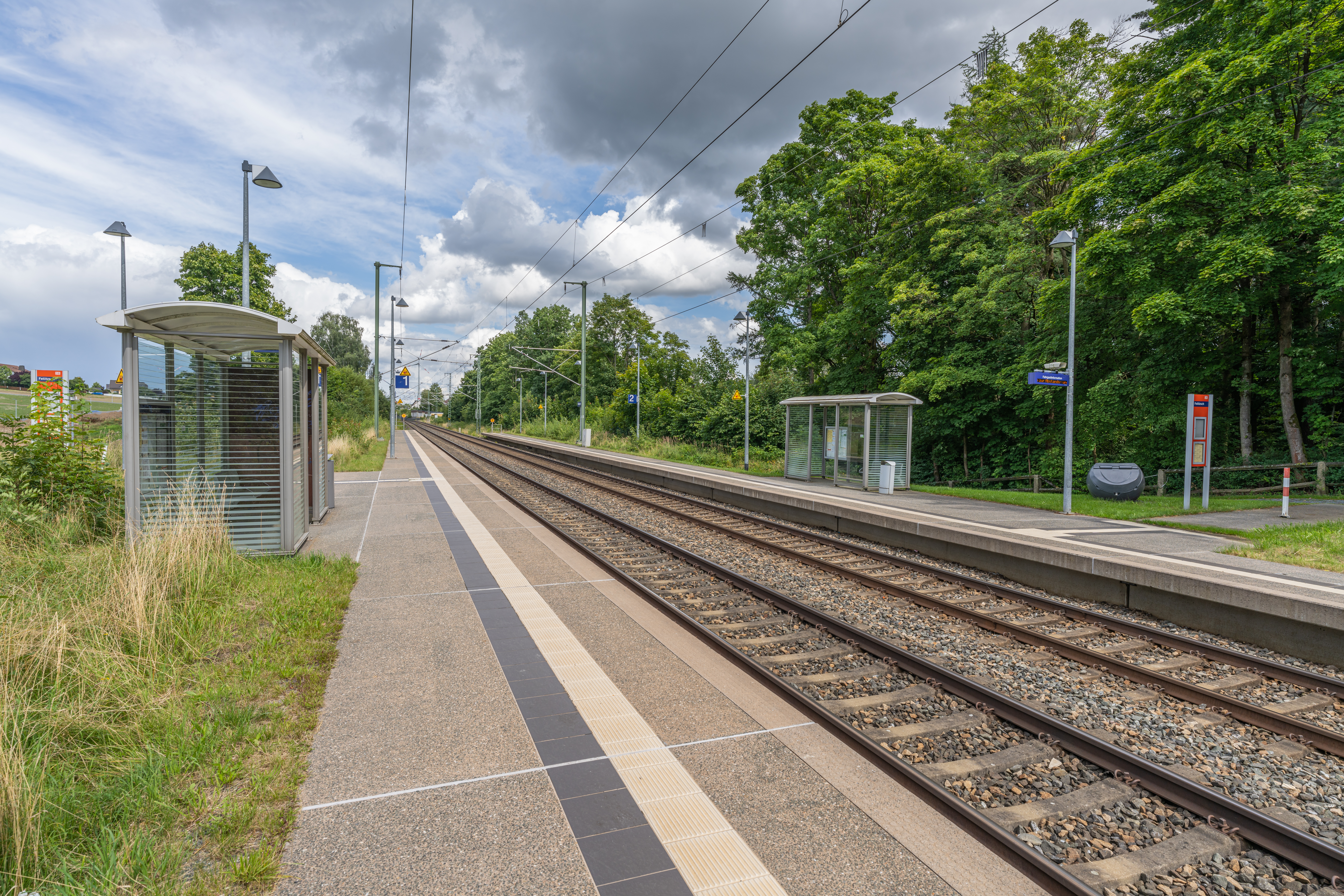
Feilitzsch station
