= Rehau station =

Railway station in Rehau, Germany

Rehau
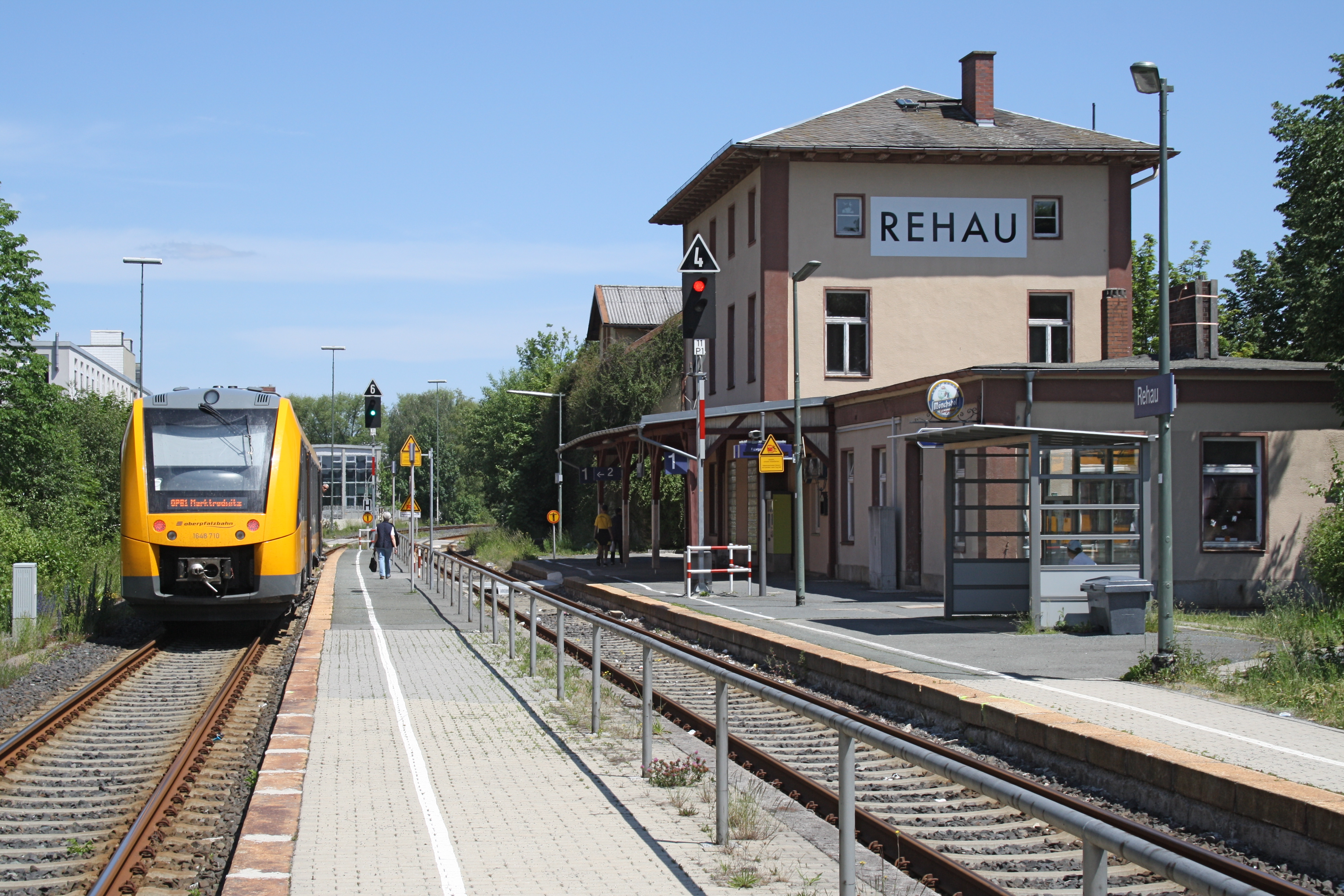
- 2019

General information
- Location: Am Bahnhof; 95111 Rehau; Bavaria; Germany
- Coordinates: 50.2505°N 12.0326°E
- Elevation: 525 m (1,722 ft)
- System: Bf
- Owner: Deutsche Bahn
- Operator: DB Station&Service
- Lines: Cheb–Oberkotzau railway (KBS 858)
- Platforms: 2 side platforms
- Tracks: 2
- Train operators: agilis
- Connections: RB

Construction
- Parking: yes
- Cycle facilities: no
- Accessible: partly

Other information
- Station code: 5176
- DS100 code: NRU
- IBNR: 8004988
- Category: 6
- Website: www.bahnhof.de

Services
Preceding station		Following station
Wurlitz towards Hof-Neuhof or Gutenfürst	RB 95	Schönwald (Oberfr) towards Marktredwitz
Wurlitz towards Hof Hbf	RB 96	Schönwald (Oberfr) towards Selb Stadt
Location
- Location within Bavaria Location within Germany Location within Europe

Rehau station is a railway station in the municipality of Rehau, located in the Hof district in Bavaria, Germany.
