= Schirnding station =

Railway station in Germany

Schirnding
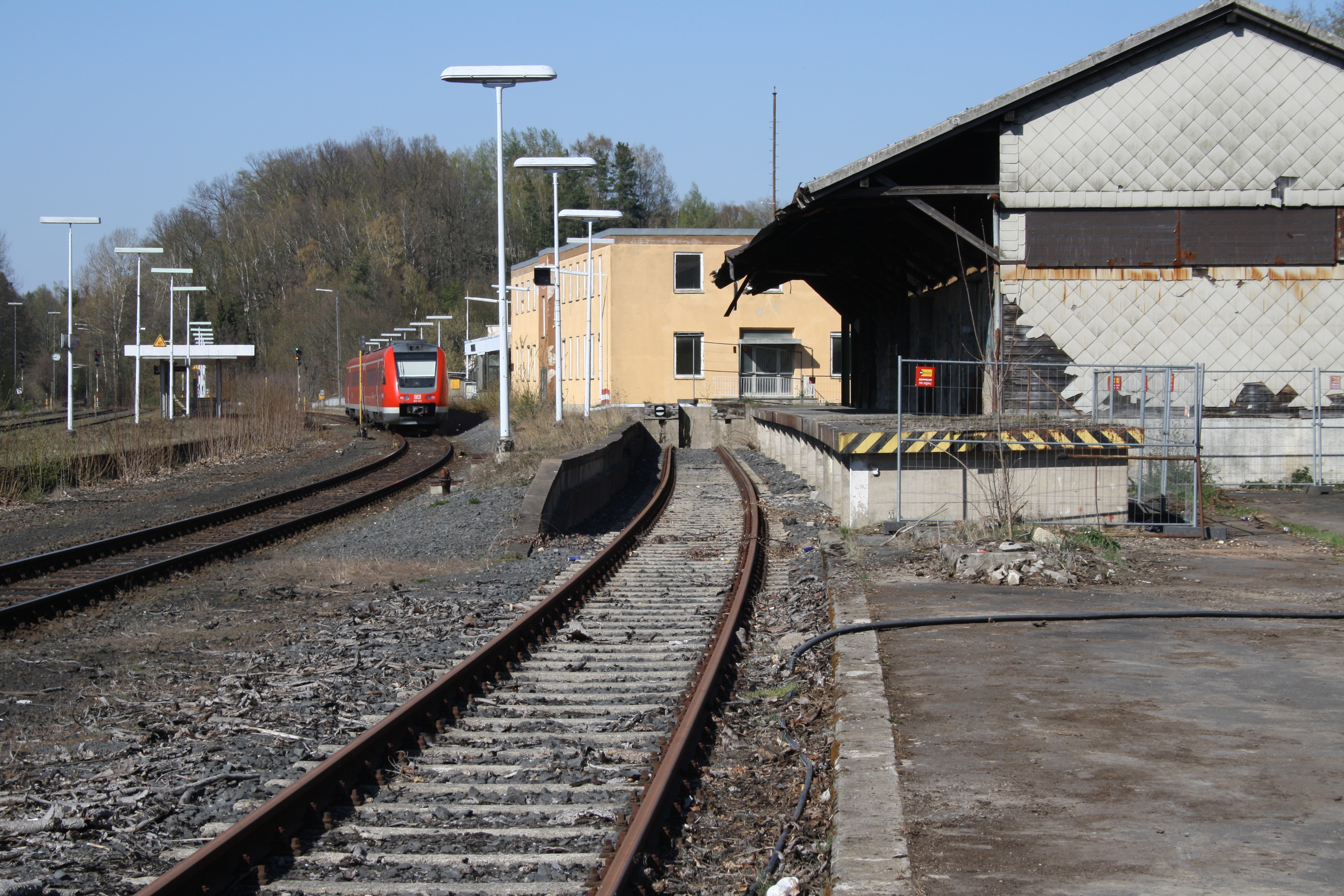
- 2019

General information
- Location: Bahnhofstraße 30; 95706 Schirnding; Bavaria; Germany
- Coordinates: 50°04′38″N 12°13′45″E
- Elevation: 461 m (1,512 ft)
- System: Bf
- Owner: Deutsche Bahn
- Operator: DB Station&Service
- Lines: Nuremberg–Cheb railway (KBS 860)
- Platforms: 2 side platforms
- Tracks: 5
- Train operators: DB Regio Bayern; oberpfalzbahn
- Connections: RE; OPB 2

Construction
- Parking: yes
- Cycle facilities: yes
- Accessible: partly

Other information
- Station code: 5573
- DS100 code: NSG
- IBNR: 8005352
- Category: 6
- Website: www.bahnhof.de

Services
Preceding station	DB Regio Bayern	Following station
Marktredwitz towards Nürnberg Hbf	RE 33	Cheb Terminus
Preceding station		Following station
Pomezí nad Ohří towards Hof-Neuhof or Gutenfürst	RB 95	Arzberg (Oberfr) towards Marktredwitz
Location
- Location within Bavaria Location within Germany Location within Europe

Schirnding station is a railway station in the municipality of Schirnding, located in the Wunsiedel district in Bavaria, Germany.
