= Koleč =

- Municipality
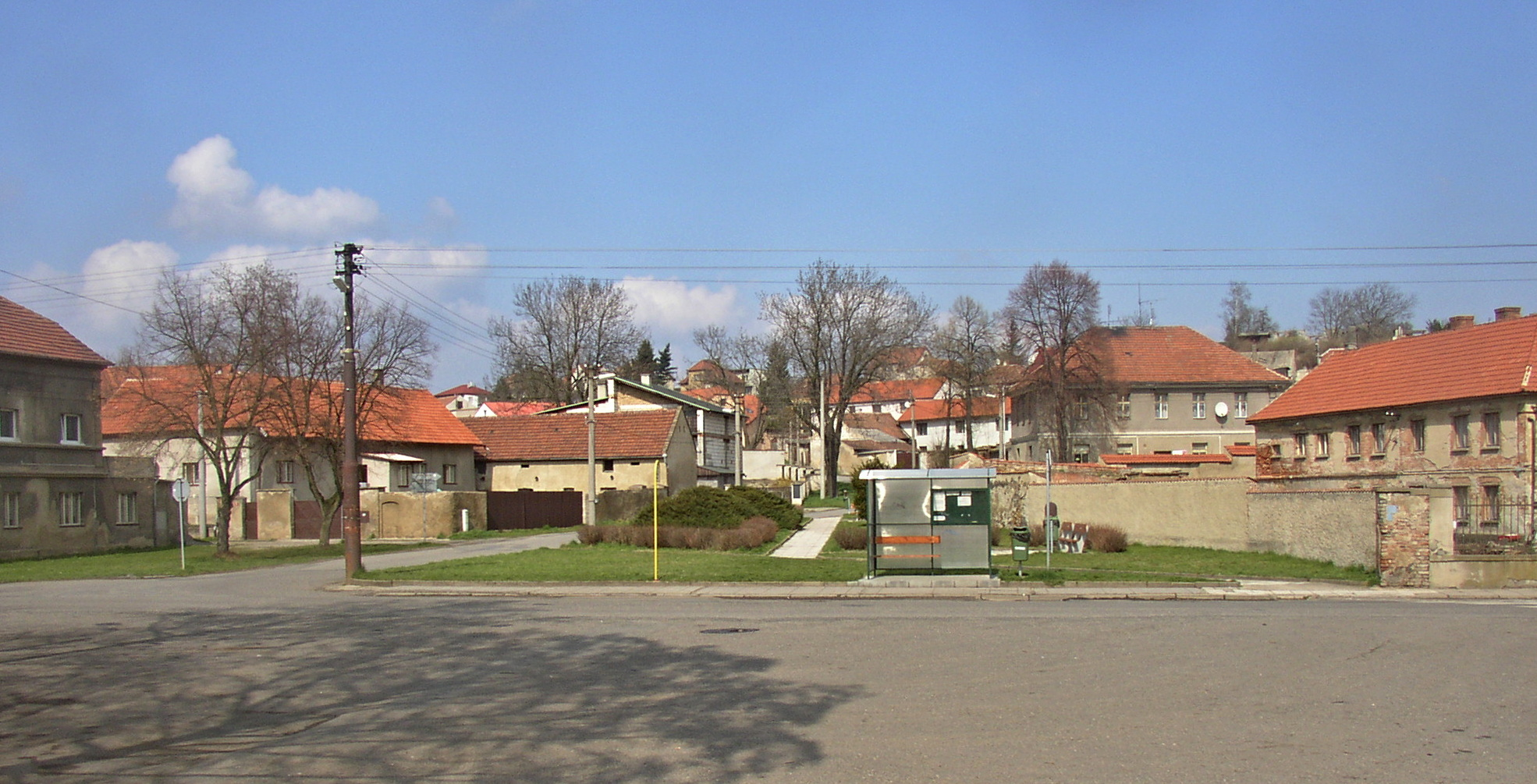
- Centre of Koleč

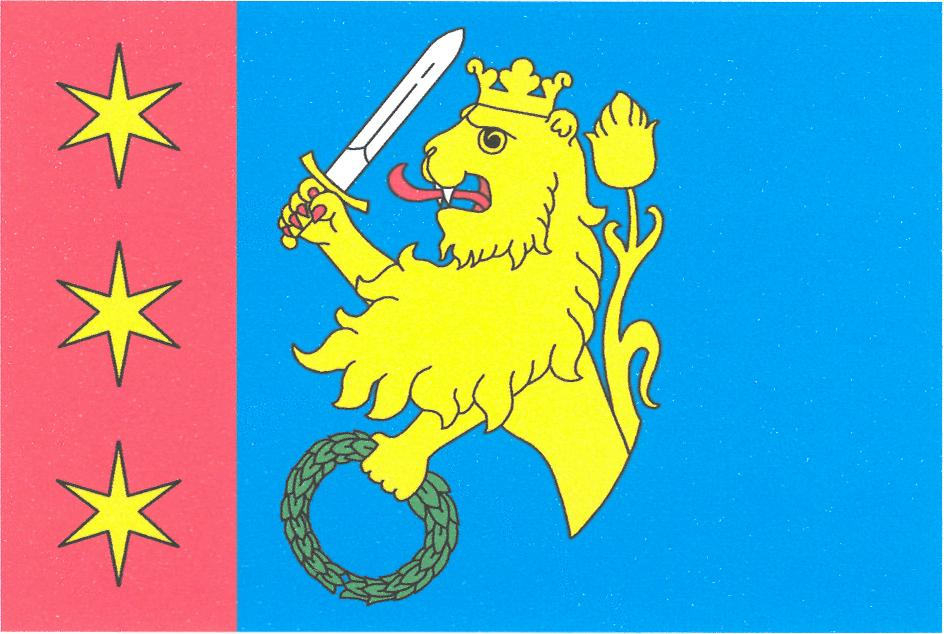
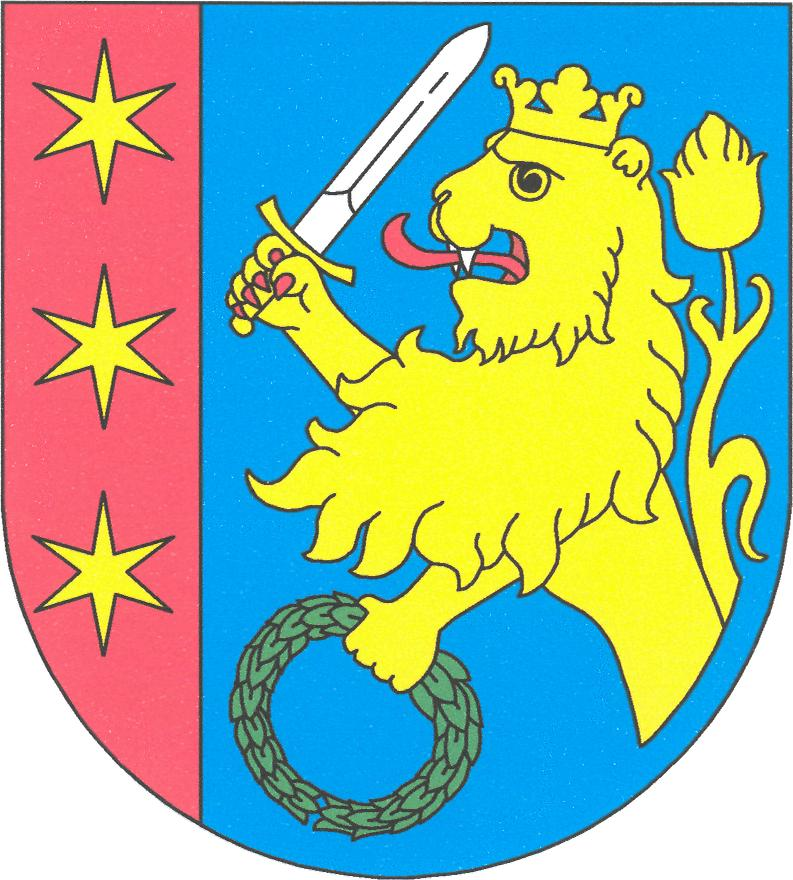
- Flag Coat of arms

- Location in the Czech Republic
- Coordinates: 50°11′56″N 14°13′25″E
- Country: Czech Republic
- Region: Central Bohemian
- District: Kladno
- First mentioned: 1140

Area
  - Total: 5.24 km^{2} (2.02 sq mi)
- Elevation: 259 m (850 ft)

Population (2026-01-01)
  - Total: 624
  - Density: 119/km^{2} (308/sq mi)
- Time zone: UTC+1 (CET)
  - Summer (DST): UTC+2 (CEST)
- Postal code: 273 29
- Website: www.kolec.cz

Koleč is a municipality and village in Kladno District in the Central Bohemian Region of the Czech Republic. It has about 600 inhabitants.

== Administrative division ==
Koleč consists of three municipal parts (in brackets population according to the 2021 census):

- Koleč (514)
- Mozolín (38)
- Týnec (32)

== Etymology ==
The initial name of the settlement was Choleč. The name was derived from the personal name Cholec or Cholek, meaning "Cholec's/Cholek's (court)". Later the name was distorted to Koleč.

== Geography ==
Koleč is located about 10 kilometres (6 mi) northeast of Kladno and 15 km (9 mi) northwest of Prague. It lies in an agricultural landscape in the Prague Plateau. The highest point is at 296 m (971 ft) above sea level.

== History ==
The first written mention of Koleč is in a document from about 1125–1140, when it was stated to be in property of the Vyšehrad Chapter. The village of Týnec was first mentioned in a forgery from the 12th century. The village of Mozolín was first mentioned in the 18th century. The most significant owner of Koleč was the Italian noble Ubelli family. They acquired Koleč in 1701 or 1702 and had built here a castle.

== Demographics ==
Historical population

Year	Pop.	±%
1869	896	—
1880	1,104	+23.2%
1890	1,111	+0.6%
1900	1,094	−1.5%
1910	1,162	+6.2%

Year	Pop.	±%
1921	1,135	−2.3%
1930	1,110	−2.2%
1950	931	−16.1%
1961	904	−2.9%
1970	842	−6.9%

Year	Pop.	±%
1980	680	−19.2%
1991	511	−24.9%
2001	552	+8.0%
2011	572	+3.6%
2021	584	+2.1%

Source: Censuses

== Transport ==
Koleč is located on the railway line Prague–Slaný. However, trains run on it only on weekends and holidays during the summer season.

== Sights ==
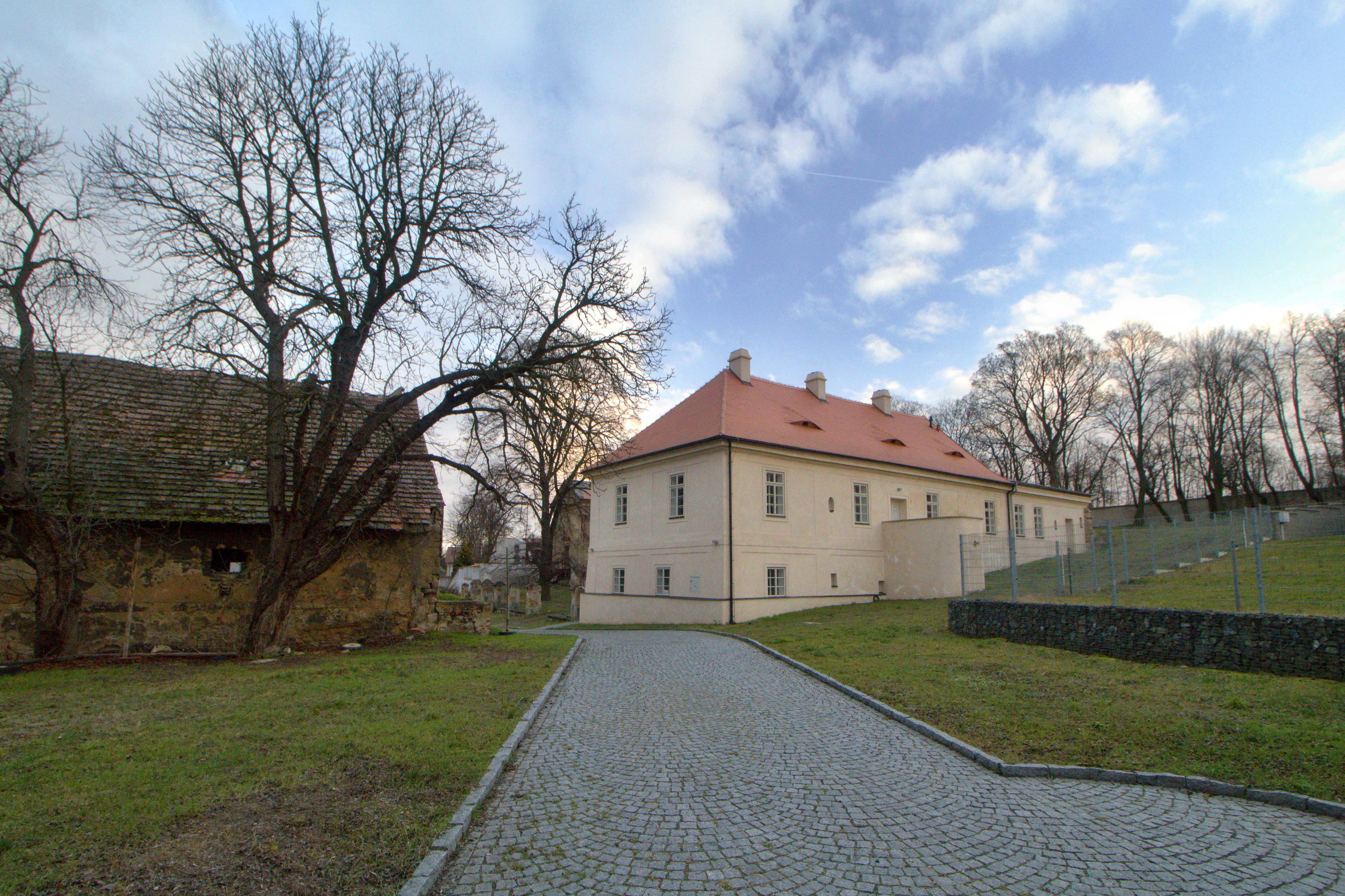
Koleč Castle

The main landmark is the Koleč Castle. It is a small Baroque castle built in 1711–1713. The Chapel of the Holy Trinity was added in 1714. The chapel was later enlarged into a church. The castle fell into disrepair in the 1990s and is gradually reconstructed.

== Notable people ==
- Josef Danda (1906–1999), architect
