= Josef Danda =

Czech railway architect (1906–1999)

Dr. M.Arch Josef Danda
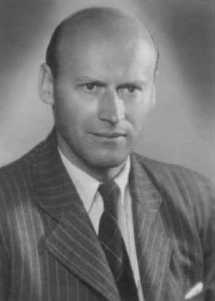
- Josef Danda, c. 1950
- Born: 2 January 1906; Koleč, Austria-Hungary
- Died: 15 March 1999 (aged 93); Prague, Czech Republic

Josef Danda (2 January 1906 – 15 March 1999) was a Czech architect. He was a specialist in railway construction and one of the authors of the Praha hlavní nádraží, the most important railway station in the Czech Republic.

== Life ==
Danda was born on 2 January 1906 in Koleč. He graduated from the Faculty of Architecture in the Czech Technical University in Prague, then went through an internship at several important studios. He also worked for a time in Paris with Le Corbusier and devoted most of his professional career to designs for transport, especially railway buildings.

After the Second World War, he became the most important expert on railway architecture in Czechoslovakia.

In the 1930s, he designed the functionalist railway station in Teplice nad Bečvou, he created the station building in Třinec in 1957. In 1958, in cooperation with Karel Řepa, he designed the Pardubice main railway station (from protected as a monument in 1987), interpreted today as the last wave of pre-war functionalism. He designed the station building in Klatovy in 1959.

Between 1956 and 1962, he became the author of the new construction of the Cheb railway station. The building was built on the site of the bombed-out original Art Nouveau building as a distinct vertical following the pre-war functionalism influenced by the contemporary Brussels style, inspired by the Expo 58 exhibition in Brussels (two mosaics in the hall by Jaroslav Moravec, stained glass entrance by Zdeněk Holub and a metal sculpture by Jaroslav Šajn on the façade of the building). The new Chebská nádraží was created, in addition to transport needs, also as a showcase of socialism on our western border, despite this, its top-notch architecture is an ornament and a defining urban element to the present day.

In the 1960s, he designed the station in Vítkovice (1967), in 1968 the station building in Lovosice and the interior of the station in Most.

In the years 1972–1979, a new check-in hall of the Prague Central Station was built. He was its co-author alongside Jan Bočan and Alena and Jan Šrámek.

He died on 15 March 1999 in Prague-Horní Počernice, at the age of 93. He was buried at the Chvalský cemetery.

== Work ==
- Teplice nad Bečvou railway station (1938–1939)
- Water tower, Prague-Běchovice station (1945)
- Pardubice main railway station (1950s - 1958)
- Cheb railway station (1956–1962)
- Třinec railway station (1957)
- Klatovy railway station (1959)
- Ostrava-Vítkovice railway station (1967)
- Lovosice railway station (1968)
- Aš railway station (1969)
- Interior of a new building in Most railway station (1977)
- Interior of a new building in Praha hlavní nádraží (1979)

== Gallery ==
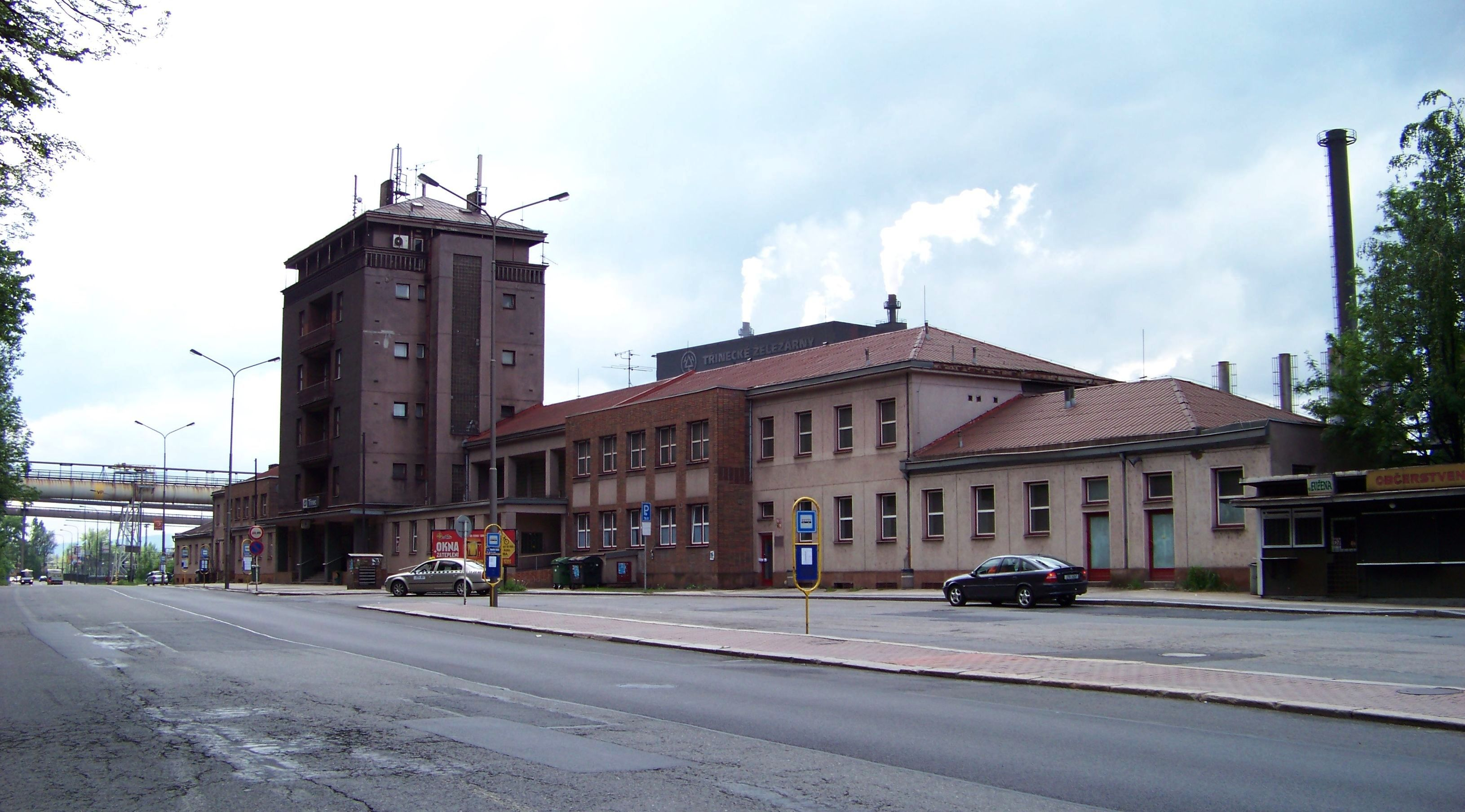
Railway station in Třinec, 1957

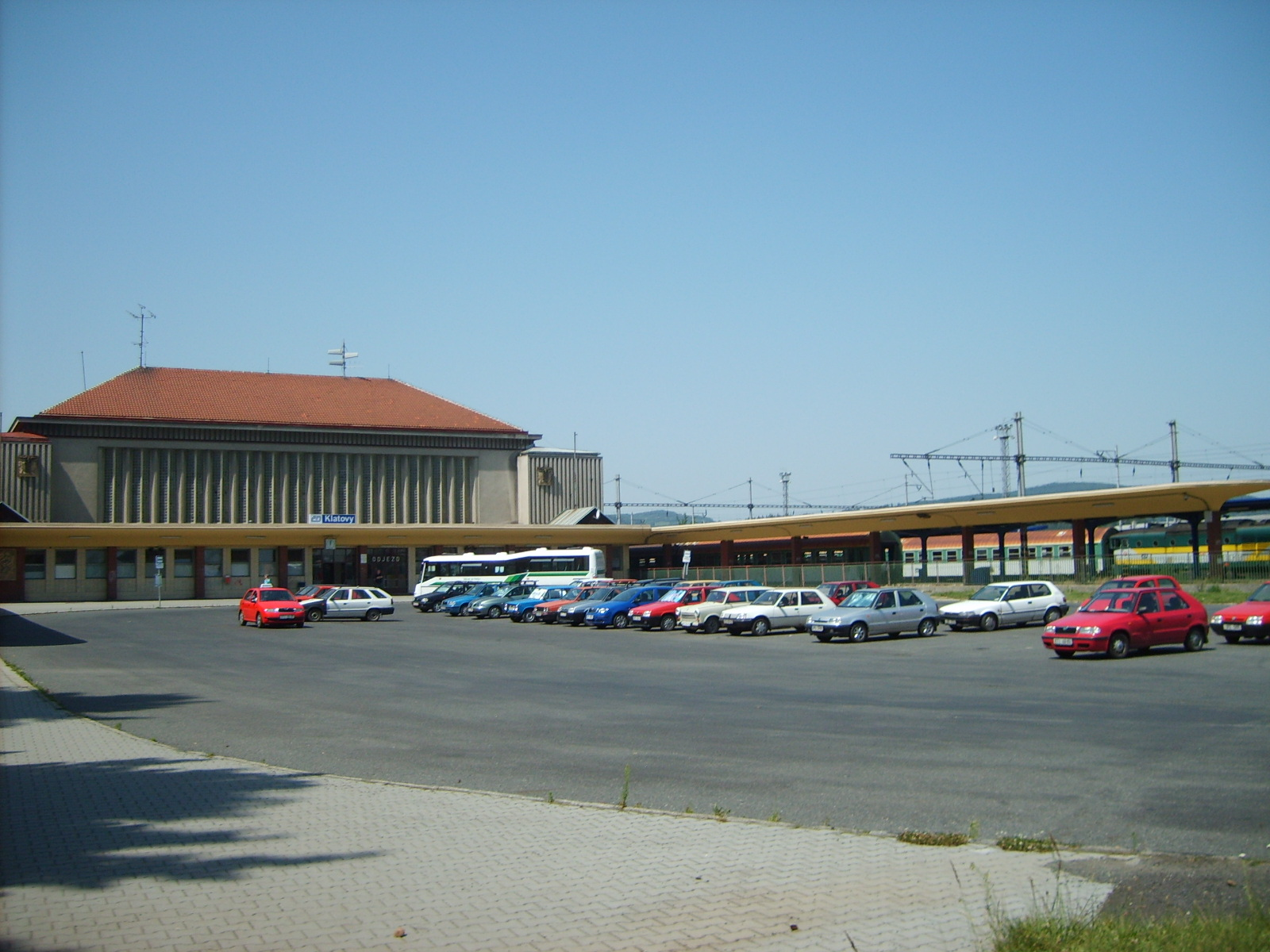
Railway station in Klatovy, 1959

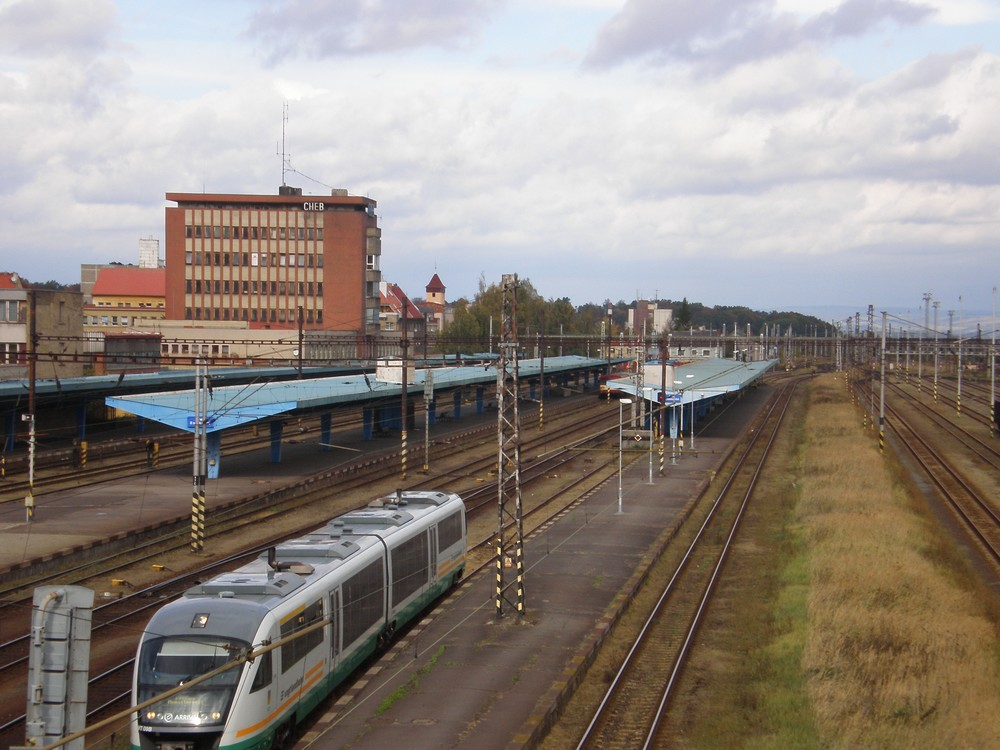
Railway station in Cheb, 1962

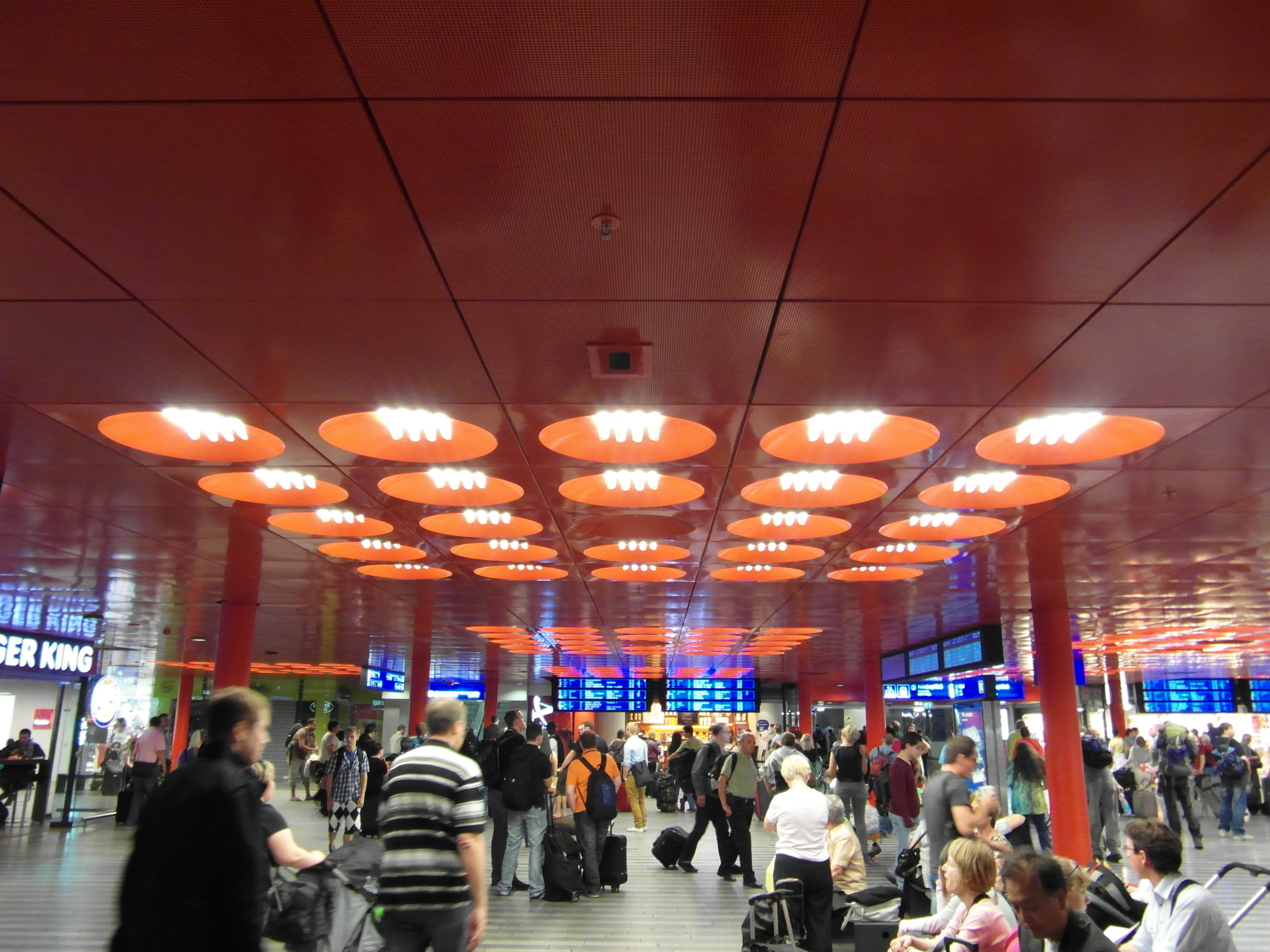
Interior of the new building of Prague's main railway station

== Citations ==
- Hájek, Karel (2007). Architekt Josef Danda. Prague: České vysoké učení technické v Praze. ISBN 978-80-01-03957-1.
- Vošahlíková, Pavla (2009). Biografický slovník českých zemí : 12. sešit : D-Die. Prague: Libri. ISBN 978-80-7277-415-9.
