= Cheb railway station =

Railway station in Cheb, Czech Republic

Cheb
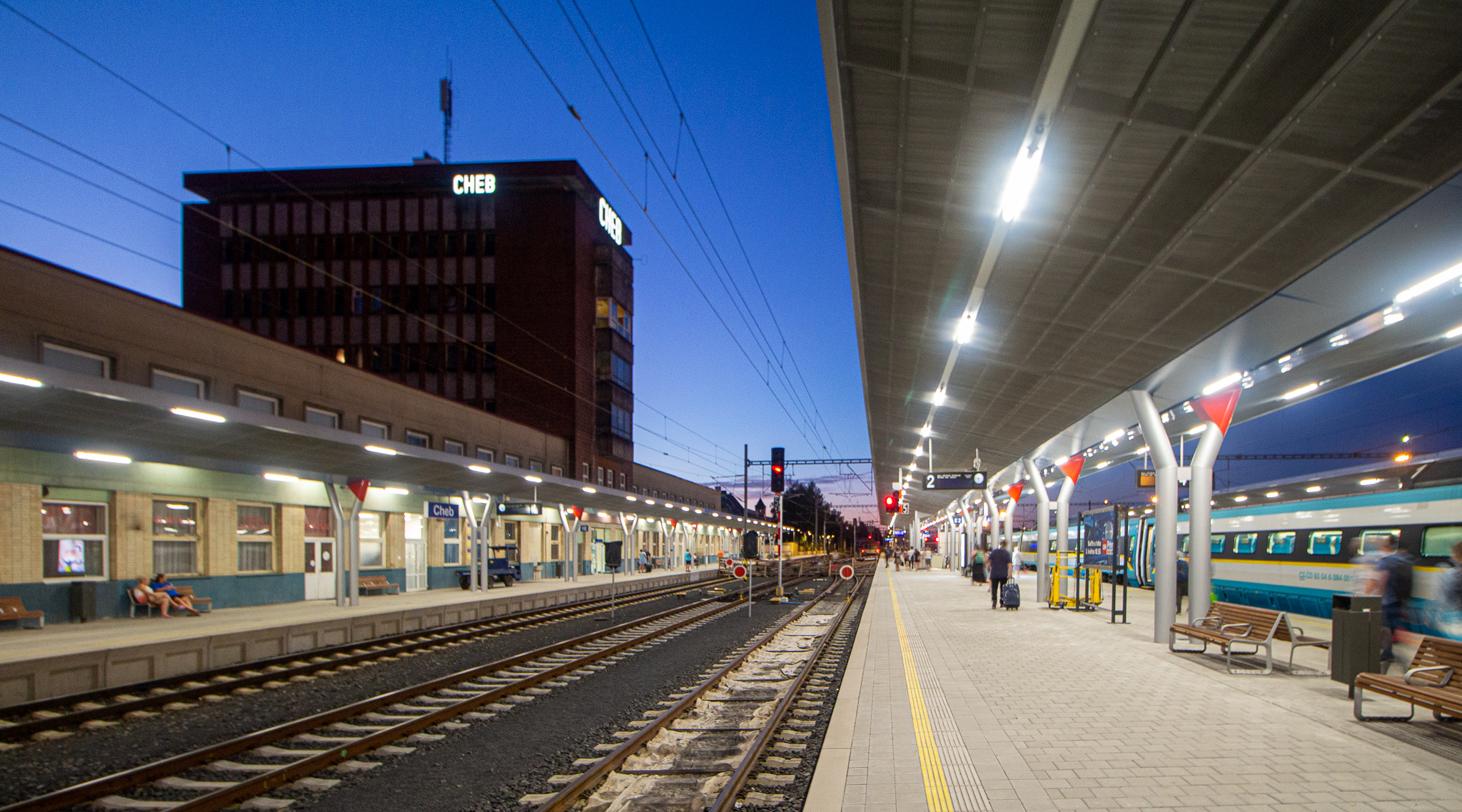
- Cheb railway station

General information
- Location: Žižkova 1301/4, náměstí Dr. Milady Horákové 1301/2 Cheb; Czech Republic
- Coordinates: 50°4′20″N 12°22′50″E
- Owner: Czech Republic
- Platforms: 3 (5)

Construction
- Architect: Heinrich von Hügel, Josef Danda

Other information
- Station code: 54750356

History
- Opened: 1865
- Rebuilt: 1962
- Electrified: 1960s

Services
Preceding station	DB Regio Bayern	Following station
Schirnding towards Nürnberg Hbf	RE 33	Terminus
Preceding station		Following station
Frantiskovy Lazne Aquaforum towards Hof Hbf	RB 95	Cheb-Skalka towards Marktredwitz
Preceding station	Vogtlandbahn	Following station
Terminus	RB 2	Frantiskovy Lazne Aquaforum towards Zwickau Zentrum
Location
- Location within Czech Republic Location within Europe

Cheb railway station (Czech: Nádraží Cheb) is a railway station in the city of Cheb in the Karlovy Vary Region in the western part of the Czech Republic.

== Tracks ==
The station is the most important transport junction in the region. Trains are operated by Czech Railways (České dráhy) and multiple Czech and German private transport companies which run trains to Germany. The station is located at a crossing of five railway lines:

- 140 – Chomutov–Cheb
- 146 – Cheb–Tršnice–Luby u Chebu
- 148 – Cheb–Hranice v Čechách
- 170 – Plzeň–Cheb
- 179 – Nuremberg–Cheb

== History ==
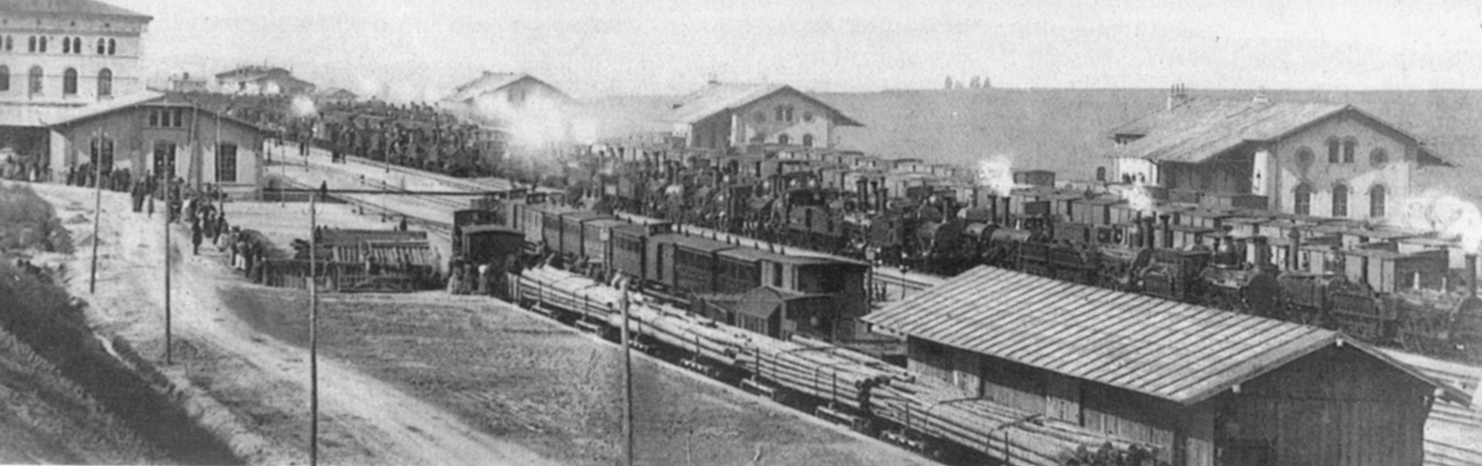
Cheb railway station area in 1866

The railway station was built in Neorenaissance style in 1865 and was designed by Viennese architect Heinrich von Hügel. In 1870 a service connecting the Ore Mountains area with Prague was started by the private railway company Buštěhrad Railway (German: Buschtěhrader Eisenbahn, B.E.B). In the same year the railway line to Chomutov was connected.

In 1872 the private company Emperor Franz Joseph Railway (German: k.k. privilegierte Kaiser-Franz-Josephs-Bahn operating trains between Prague and Vienna) started to operate rail transport from Cheb to České Budějovice. In 1881 the line to Nuremberg was opened. Each company operating in Cheb had its own station house.

After the fall of the Austro-Hungarian Empire and declaration of independent Czechoslovakia the station was renamed to Cheb, but because of the huge German-speaking population in the city all station signs were bilingual. During the Second World War, on 8 April 1945, the United States air forces conducted a raid on the town and most of the station area, except the main building, was destroyed (Kunst 1992). Since 1946 after the expulsion of Germans from Czechoslovakia the station has been known only by its Czech name.

The absence of a new solid station building lasted till 1962. The design, which was prepared in 1956-59 by the architect Josef Danda (who also designed Pardubice station) in Brussels style, was declared by the Czech Ministry of Culture as a cultural monument.

In 2007 a new bus terminus in the front of the station was finished and is served by city public bus transport and serves as the main bus terminus in Cheb.

== Photo gallery ==
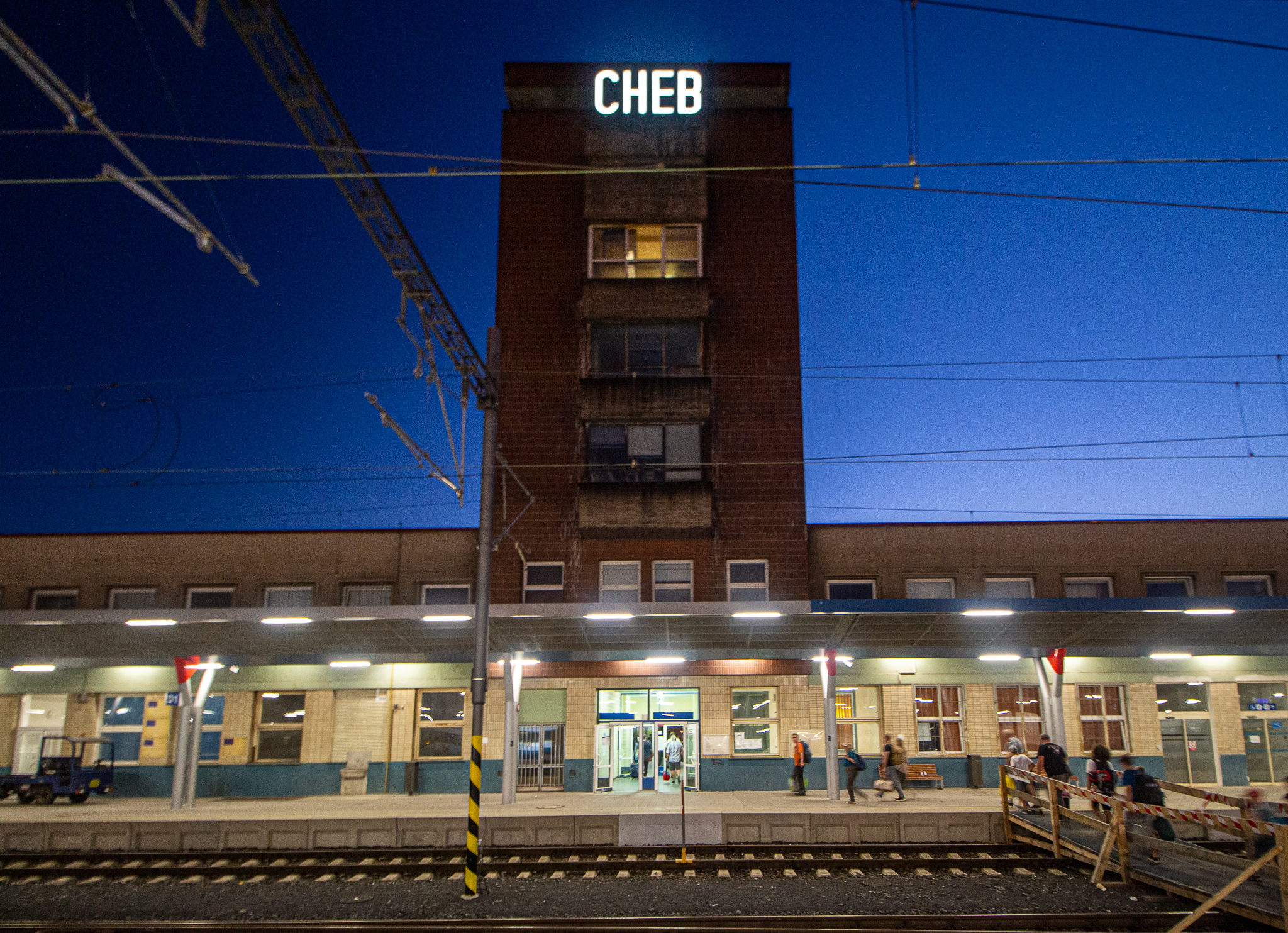
Station building

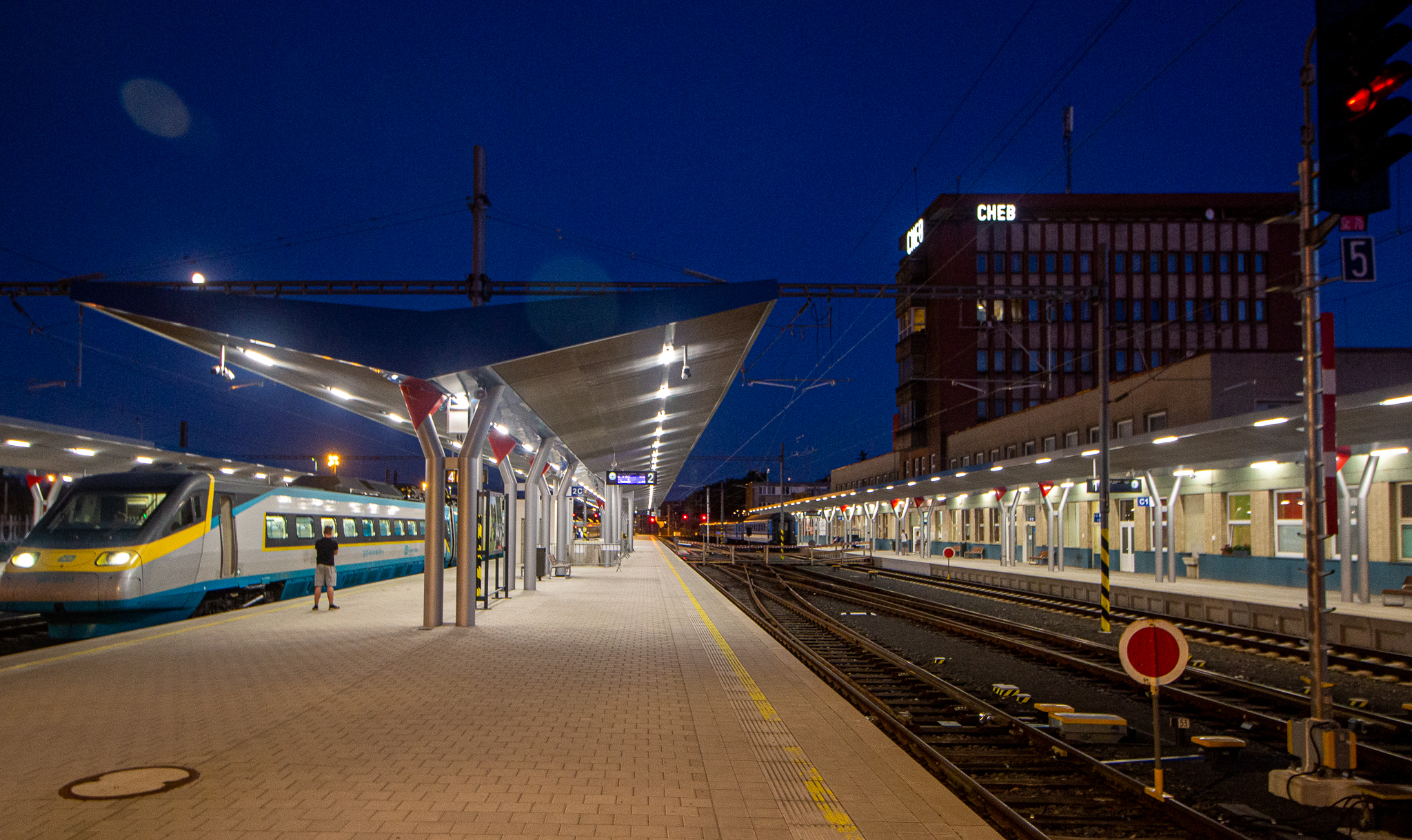
Platform no. 2

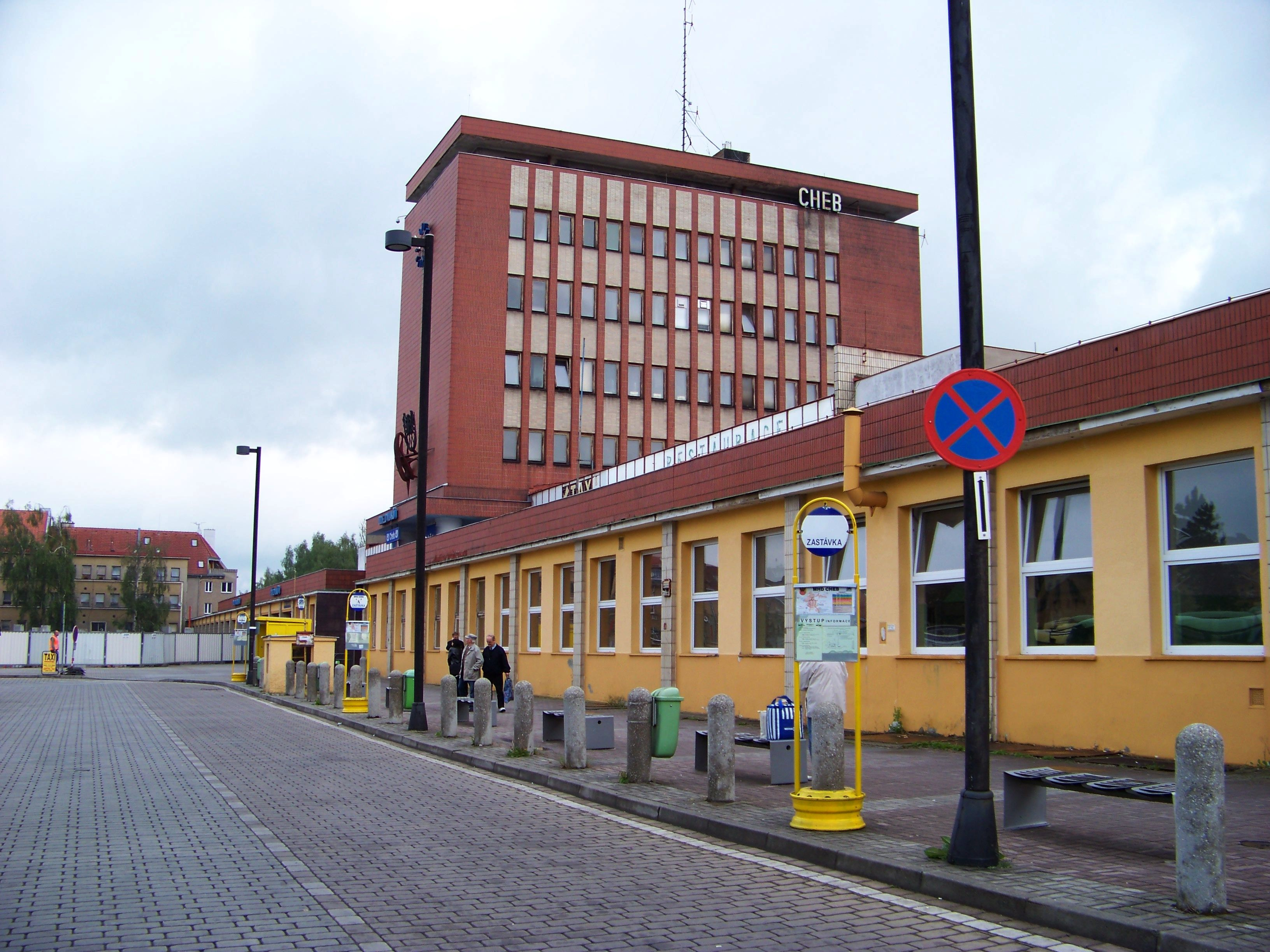
Cheb railway station

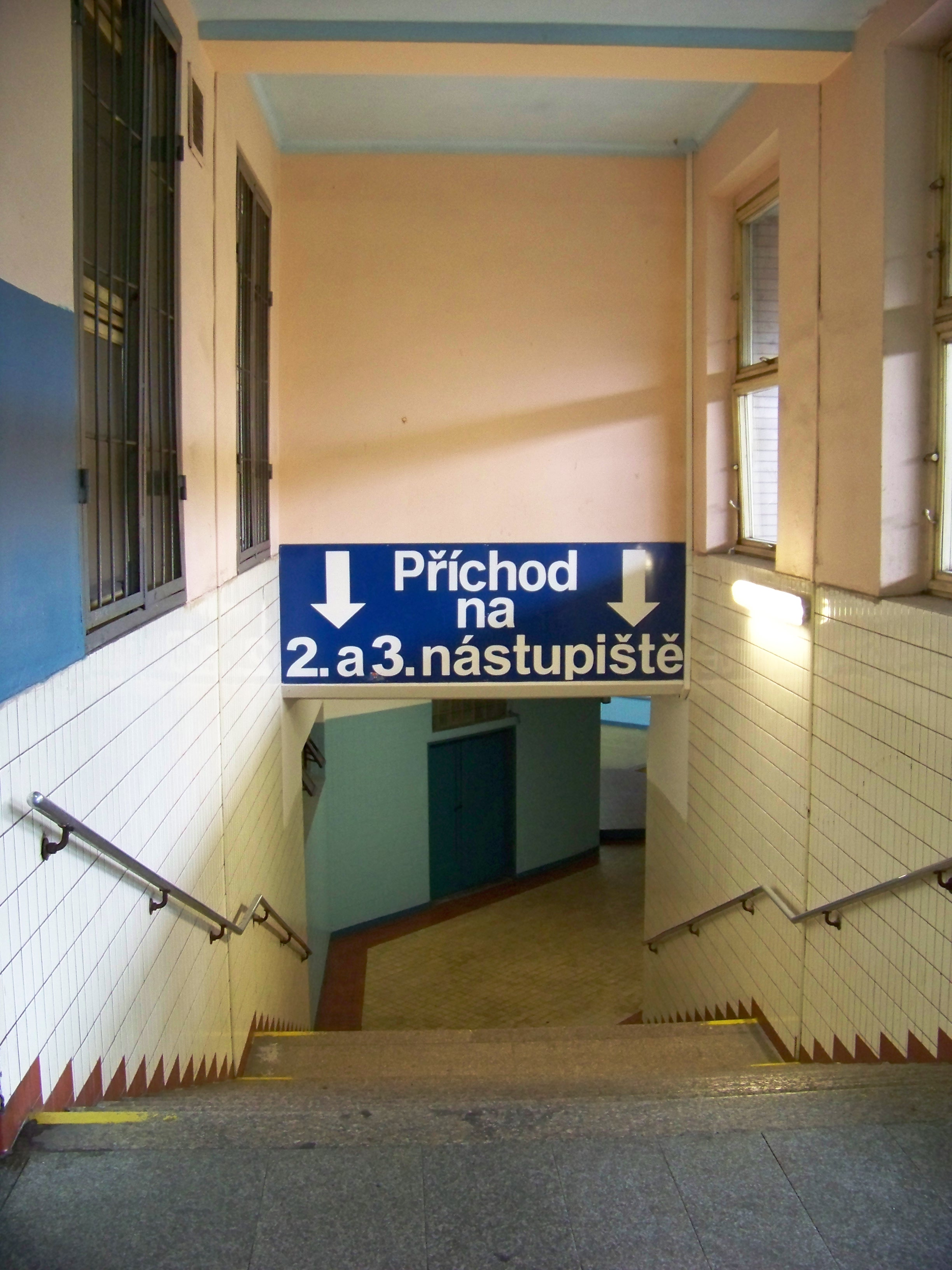
Underpass

== Literature ==
- Wilfried Rettig: Die Eisenbahnen im Vogtland – Band 1: Entwicklung, Hauptstrecken, Fahrzeuge, Bahnbetriebswerke und Hochbauten, EK-Verlag, Freiburg 2001, ISBN 3-88255-686-2, S. 78
- Siegfried Bufe, Heribert Schröpfer: Eisenbahnen im Sudetenland, Bufe-Fachbuchverlag, Egglham, 1991 ISBN 3-922138-42-X; S. 77
