= Marktredwitz station =

Railway station in Germany

Marktredwitz
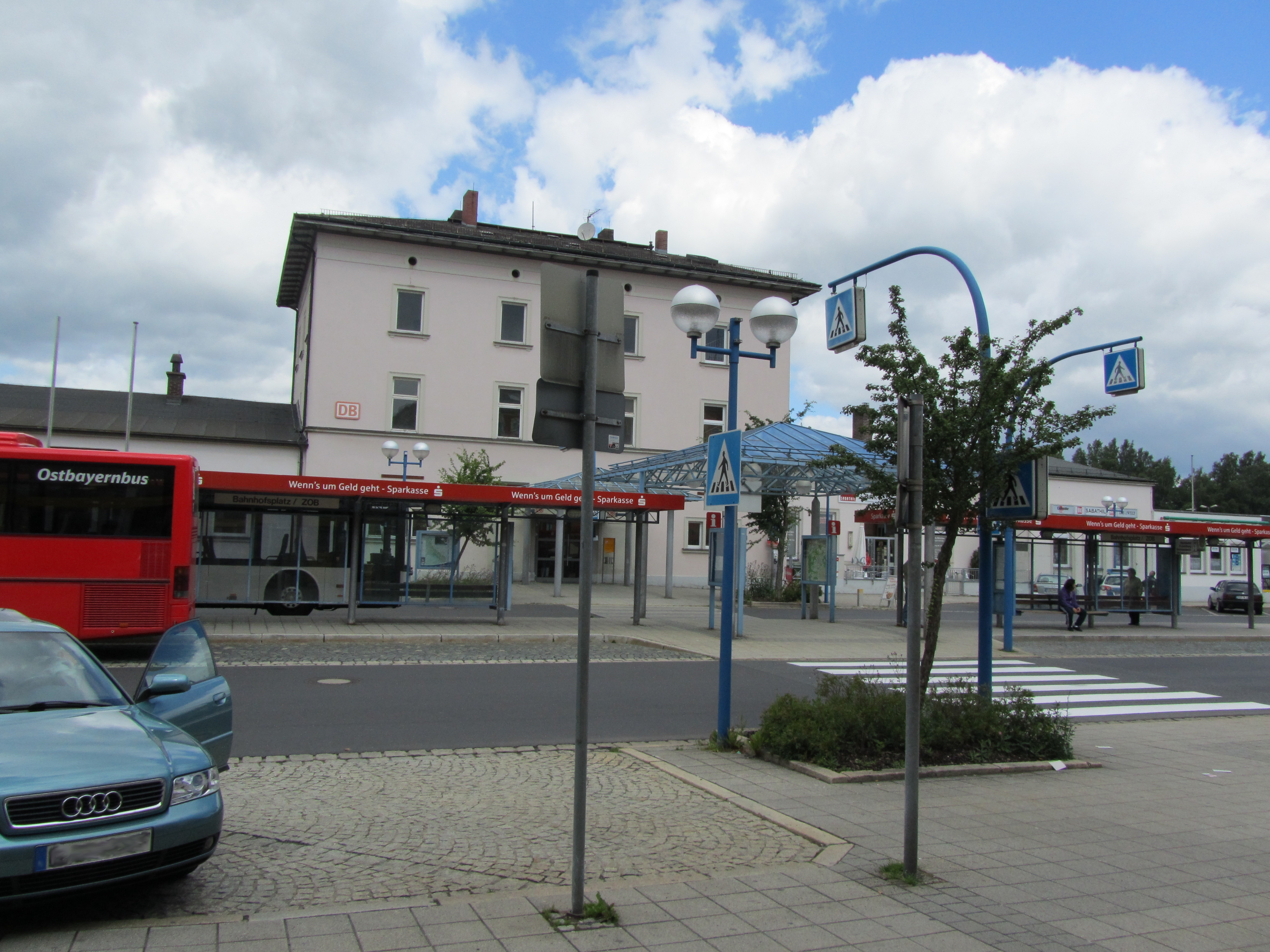
- Entrance building and station forecourt

General information
- Location: Marktredwitz, Bavaria; Germany
- Coordinates: 50°0′16″N 12°4′57″E
- Owner: Deutsche Bahn
- Operator: DB Station&Service
- Lines: Regensburg–Hof (KBS 855); Nuremberg–Cheb (KBS 512, 544, 860)
- Platforms: 5

Construction
- Accessible: Yes (except platforms 2 and 3)

Other information
- Station code: 3979
- DS100 code: NMR
- IBNR: 8000247
- Category: 3
- Website: stationsdatenbank.de; www.bahnhof.de

History
- Opened: 15 May 1878

Passengers
- < 5,000 (2006)

Services
Preceding station		Following station
Wiesau (Oberpfalz) towards München Hbf	RE 23	Hof Hbf Terminus
Preceding station		Following station
Pechbrunn towards Regensburg Hbf	RB 23	Terminus
Preceding station	DB Regio Bayern	Following station
Wiesau (Oberpfalz) towards München Hbf	RE 2	Hof Hbf Terminus
Kirchenlaibach towards Nürnberg Hbf	RE 31	Hof Hbf Terminus
Kirchenlaibach towards Nürnberg Hbf	RE 33	Schirnding towards Cheb
Preceding station		Following station
Arzberg (Oberfranken) towards Hof Hbf	RB 95	Terminus
Waldershof towards Bayreuth Hbf	RB 97	Wunsiedel-Holenbrunn towards Bad Steben
Location

Marktredwitz station is the station of the major district town of Marktredwitz in the Bavarian administrative region of Upper Franconia. Two main lines, the Nuremberg–Cheb railway and the Weiden–Oberkotzau railway, cross at the station. It is classified by Deutsche Bahn as a category 3 station and has five platform tracks.

Marktredwitz station—still called Markt Redwitz at the opening of the station—is an important railway hub in Northern Bavaria. It is located in the northwest of the town and is about a five-minute walk from the town centre.

In the station forecourt (German: Bahnhofplatz) is the central bus station, where buses connect Marktredwitz with the surrounding area. The bus station is also the stopping point of the Bavaria–Berlin Express (BEX). At the station there is a hotel, a major site of Deutsche Post, a medical centre and the headquarters of the Scherdel Group, a manufacturer of machinery parts.

== History ==
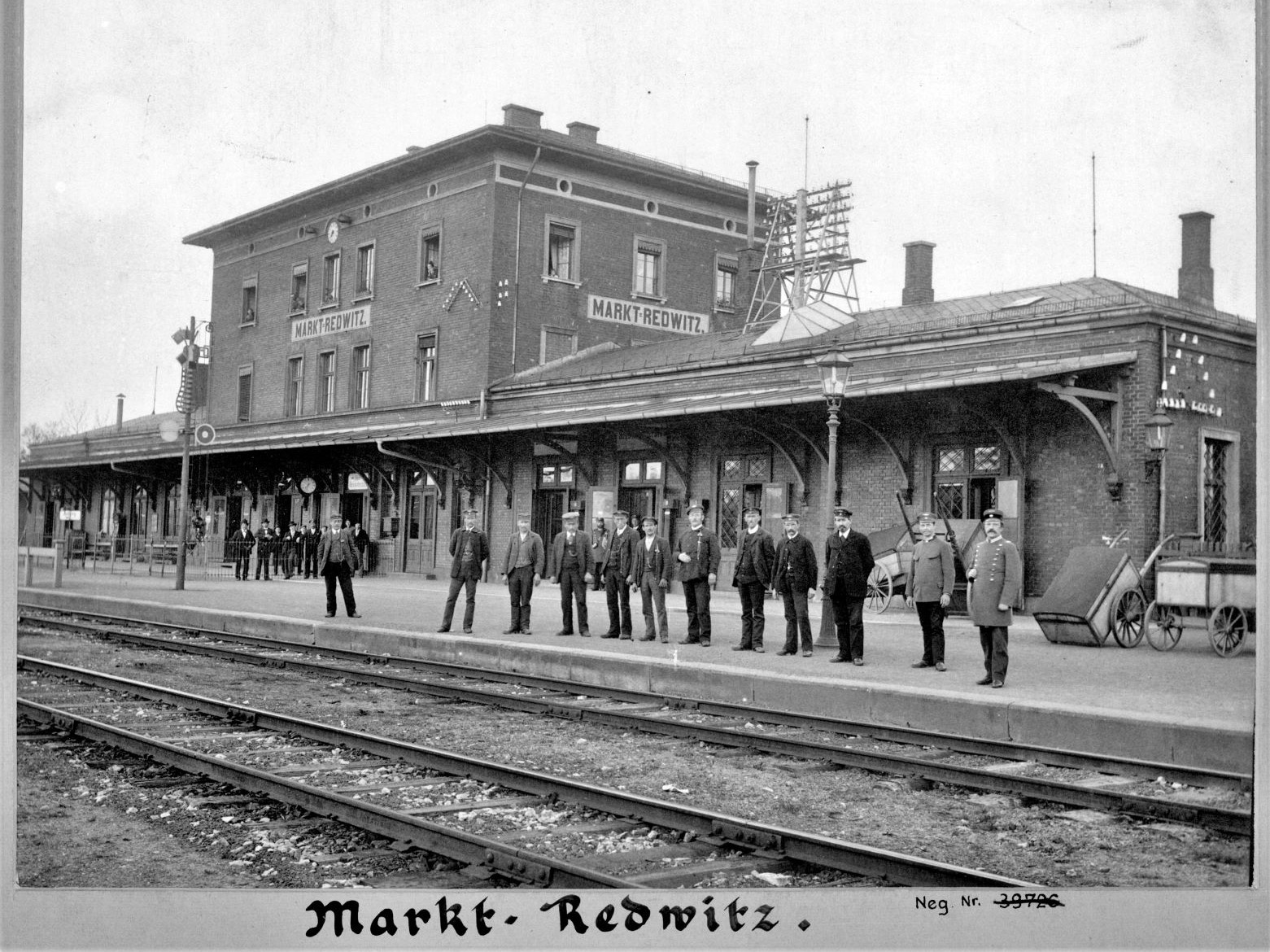
Historic station photo

The station was opened on 15 May 1878 by the Royal Bavarian State Railways as a through station along with the Schnabelwaid–Marktredwitz line (now part of the Nuremberg–Cheb line) and the Marktredwitz–Holenbrunn line (now part of the Regensburg–Hof line). The station became a junction with the commissioning of the branch to Schirnding (later extended to Cheb, then called Eger; the whole line is now part of the Nuremberg–Cheb line) on 20 November 1879 and the link from Wiesau (now a section of the Regensburg–Hof line) on 1 June 1882.

Before World War II, Marktredwitz was an important railway hub for the whole of Europe. The Rome–Munich–Berlin–Stockholm and the Paris–Nuremberg–Prague routes crossed there. 100 trains daily left the station in the four different directions. Even during the fall of the Berlin Wall, Marktredwitzer station played a crucial role. For many East Germans, the stop at the station was the first opportunity to leave the crowded trains, which crossed the border at Hof or near Cheb.

Until 2006, Marktredwitz was a stop on the Nuremberg–Dresden-Hof Intercity route. When that service ended, Marktredwitz was served by the Franken-Sachsen-Express (FSX). Following the electrification of the Reichenbach–Hof line, this service was also discontinued. Since then, RE trains (RE2 and RE31) have operated only on the Nuremberg–Hof route.

== Infrastructure ==
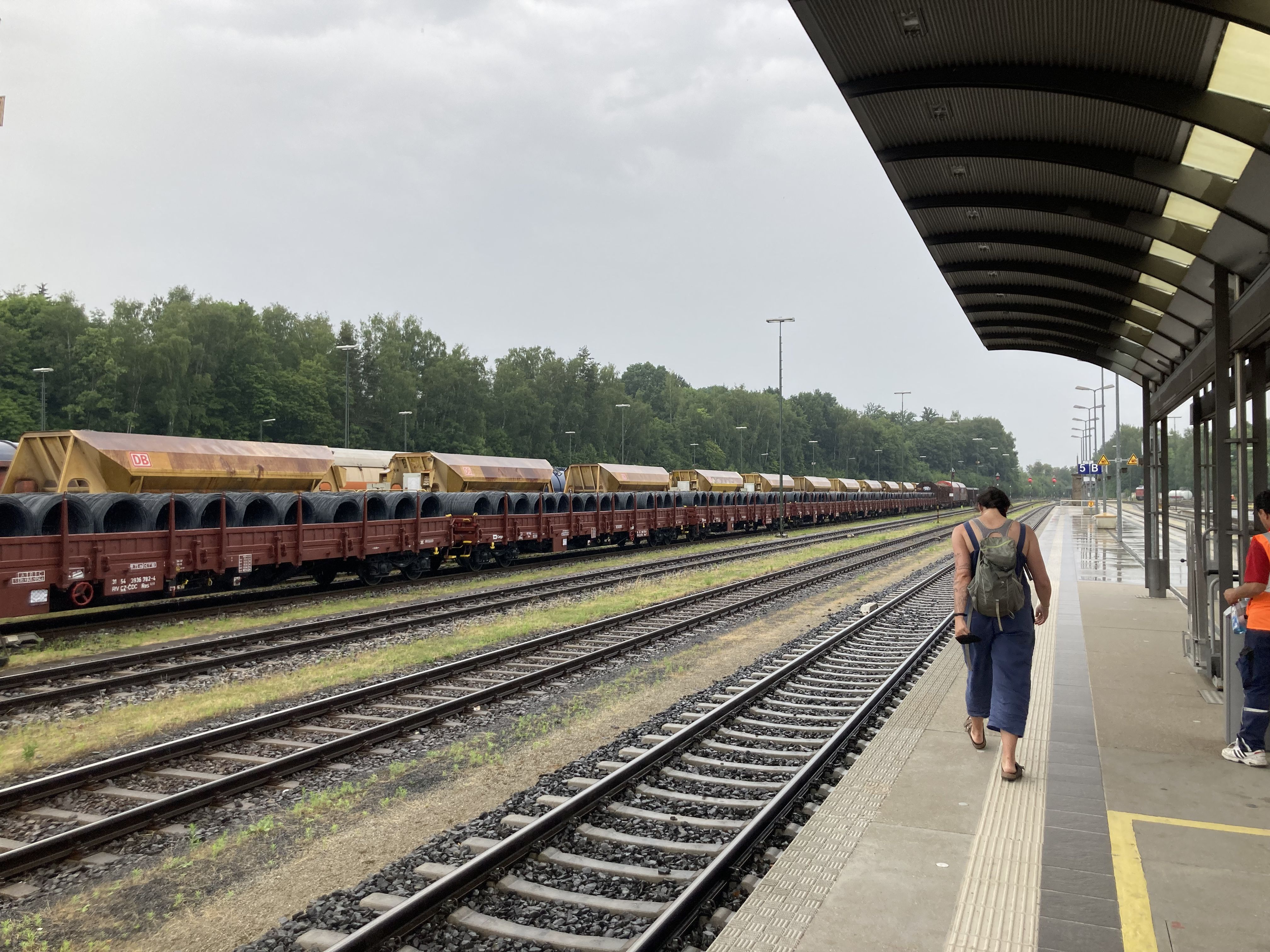
Tracks

The once extensive system of tracks has been reduced in recent years. In freight transport, the station is an important transhipment point for intermodal transport for Northern Bavaria. Five platform tracks are available for passengers. In the station building there is a bookstore, a bakery and a Deutsche Bahn travel center with ticket machines and a waiting area. The station is partly barrier-free but access to tracks 2 and 3 is by stairs only. There are plans for a significant upgrade of the station as part of regional electrification schemes, which would involve upgrading the station subway to make it fully accessible.

An electronic interlocking is responsible for controlling the station itself and the operating points of Holenbrunn, Kirchenlamitz, Marktleuthen, Martinlamitz, Neusorg, Pechbrunn, Röslau and Waldershof.

== Rail services ==
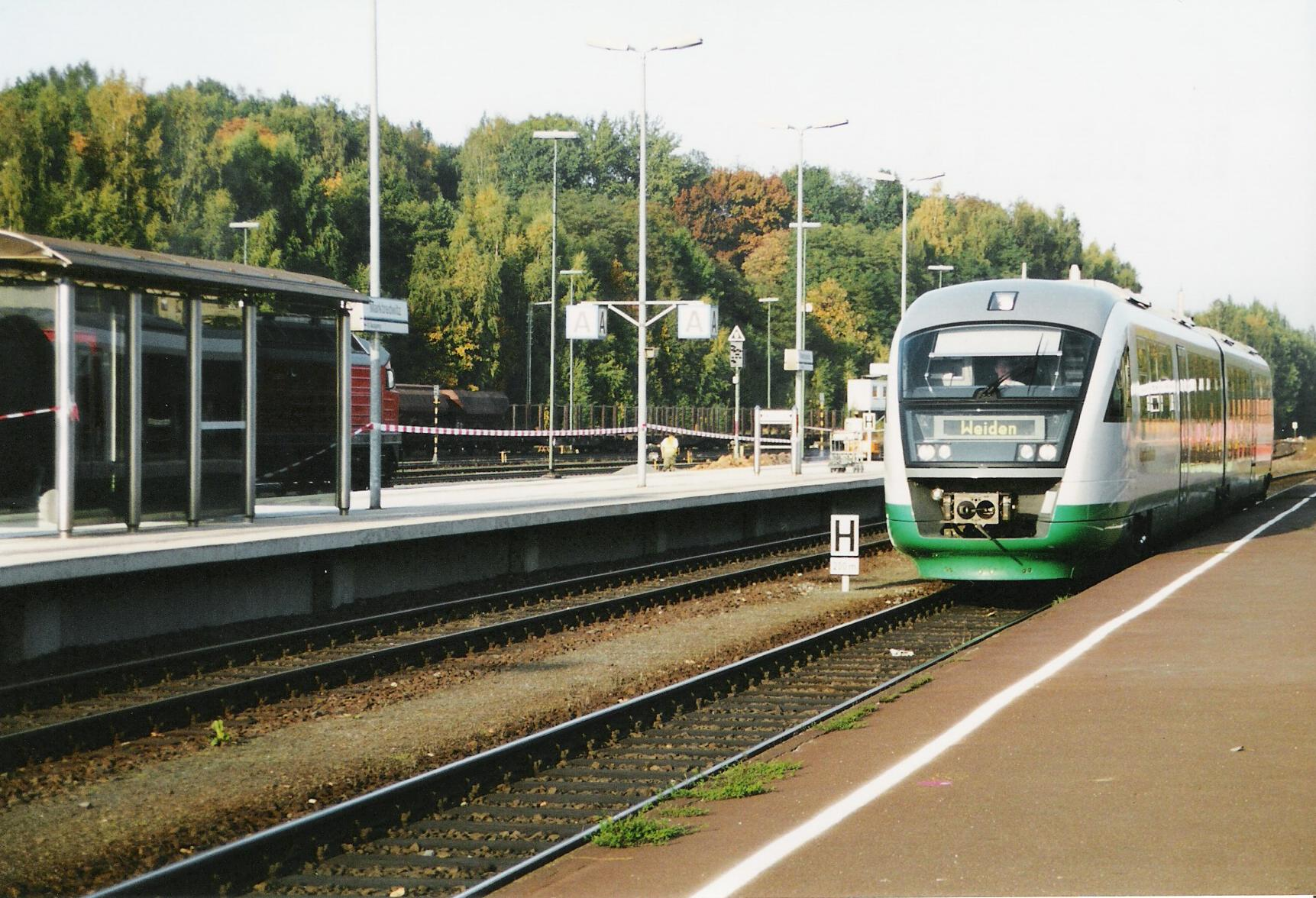
A Siemens Desiro of the Vogtlandbahn to Weiden in Marktredwitz

The station has lost its importance for long-distance services, but still forms a central interchange for northern Bavaria, Saxony and western Bohemia. It is operated by Deutsche Bahn with Regional-Express services as well as services operated by Regentalbahn and its subsidiary Die Länderbahn, including its Alex service.

Direct connections are available to Cheb, Hof, Munich, Nuremberg, Regensburg, Schwandorf and Weiden.

Line	Route	Frequency	Operator
RE 2	Munich – Landshut – Regensburg – Schwandorf – Marktredwitz – Hof	120 min	DB Regio Bayern
RE 23	Munich – Landshut – Regensburg – Schwandorf – Marktredwitz – Hof	One train pair	alex
RE 31	Hof – Marktredwitz – Pegnitz – Nürnberg	120 min	DB Regio Bayern
RE 33	Cheb – Marktredwitz – (Nürnberg)	120 min	DB Regio Bayern
RB 23	Regensburg – Schwandorf – Marktredwitz	60 min	Oberpfalzbahn
RB 95	Hof – Schönwald – Cheb – Schirnding – Marktredwitz	120 min	agilis
RB 97	Bad Steben – Hof – Marktredwitz – Kirchenlaibach – Bayreuth	60 min	agilis
