= Selb Stadt station =

Railway station in Bavaria, Germany

Selb Stadt
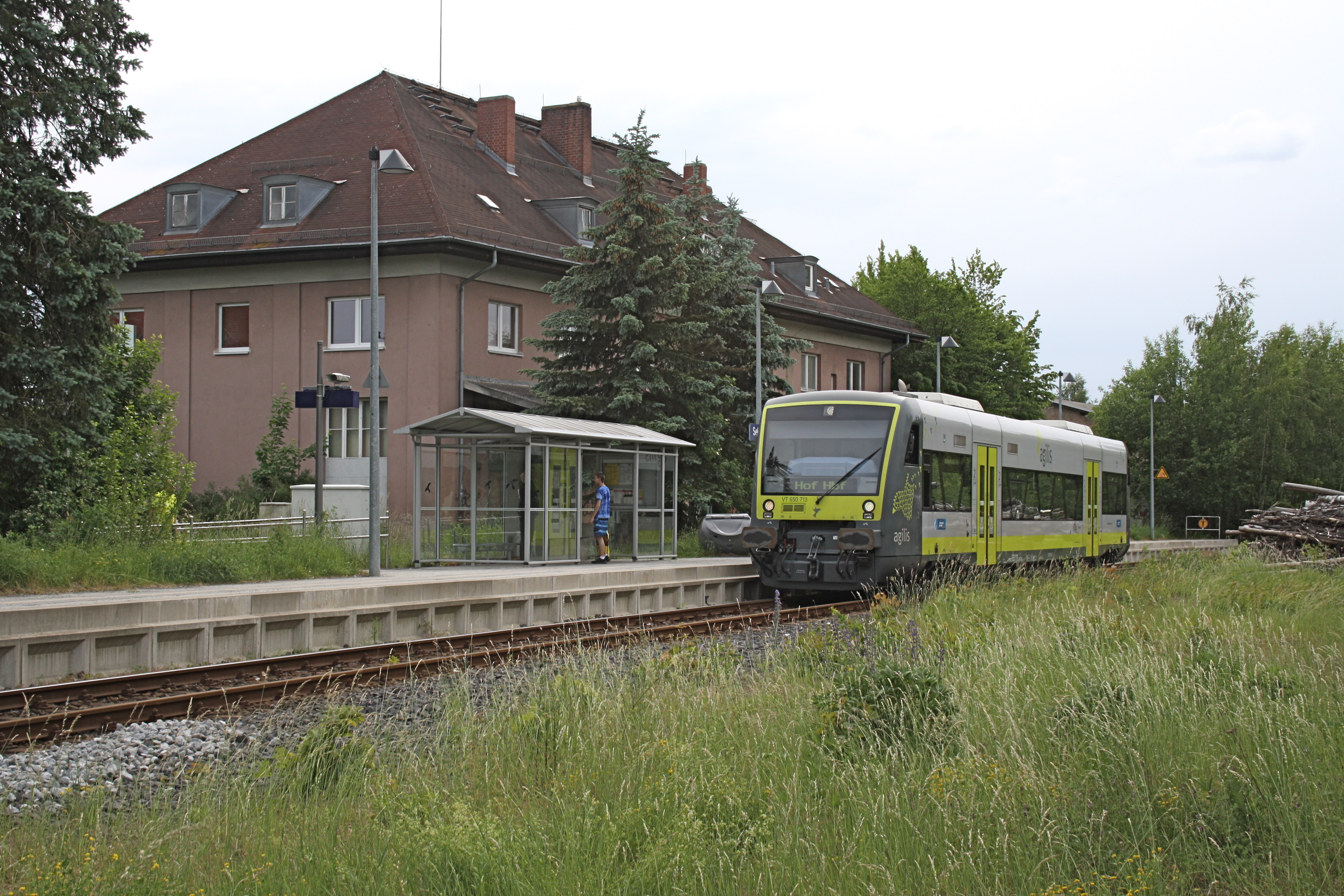
- 2019

General information
- Location: Goetheplatz 1; 95100 Selb; Bavaria; Germany
- Coordinates: 50.1741°N 12.1264°E
- Elevation: 561 m (1,841 ft)
- System: Hp
- Owner: Deutsche Bahn
- Operator: DB Station&Service
- Lines: Holenbrunn–Selb railway (KBS 858)
- Platforms: 1 side platform
- Tracks: 1
- Train operators: agilis
- Connections: RB

Construction
- Parking: yes
- Cycle facilities: yes
- Accessible: yes

Other information
- Station code: 5811
- DS100 code: NSS
- IBNR: 8005517
- Category: 7
- Website: www.bahnhof.de

Services
Preceding station		Following station
Selb Nord towards Hof Hbf	RB 96	Terminus
Location
- Location within Bavaria Location within Germany Location within Europe

Selb Stadt station is a railway station in the municipality of Selb, located in the Wunsiedel district in Bavaria, Germany.
