= Holenbrunn–Selb railway =

Railway line in Bavaria, Germany

Holenbrunn–Selb-Plößberg
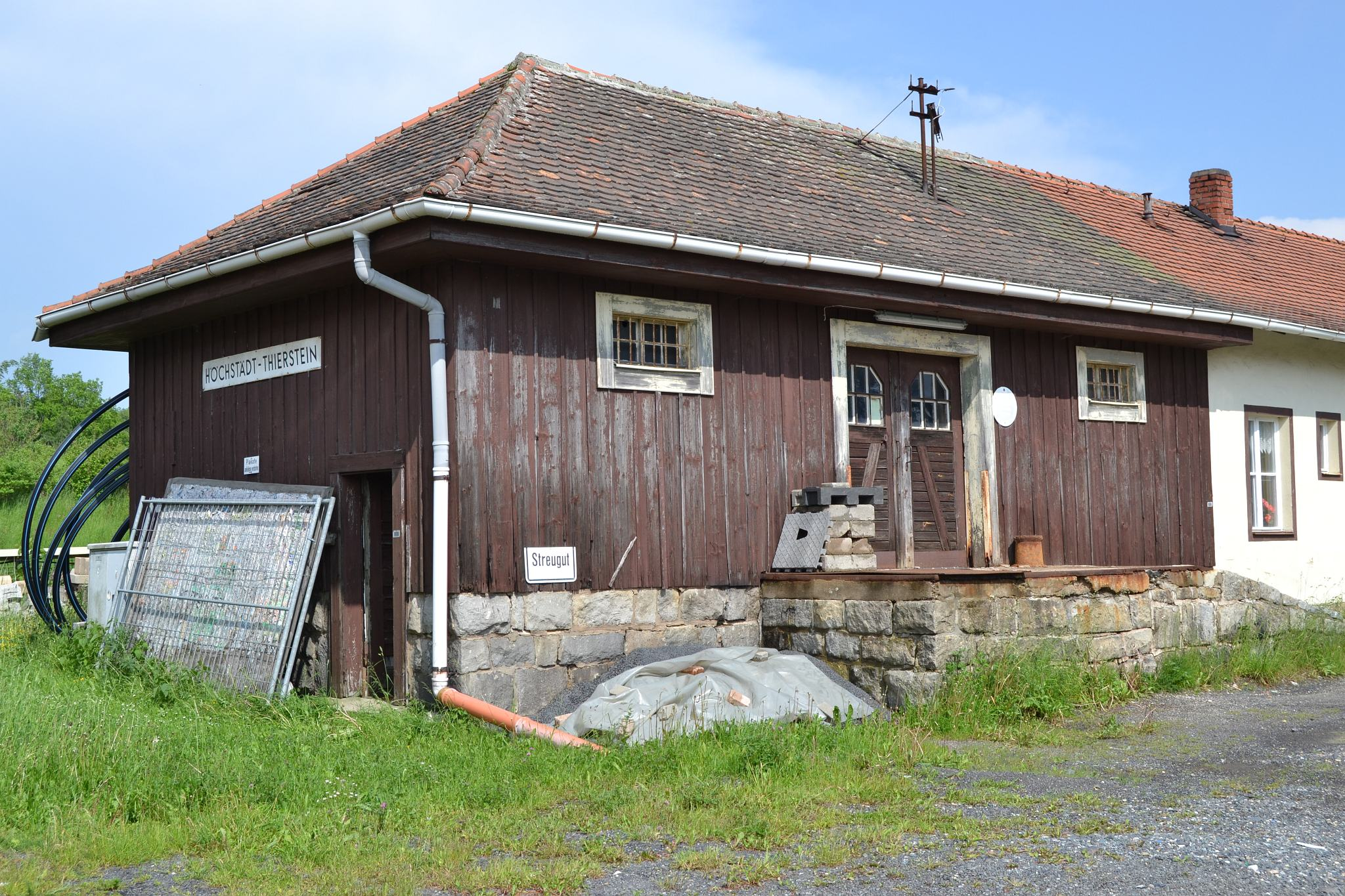

Overview
- Line number: 5032 (Holenbrunn–Selb Stadt), 5033 (Selb-Plößberg–Selb Stadt)

Service
- Route number: 858 (Selb Stadt–Selb-Plößberg)

Technical
- Line length: 26.5 km (16.5 mi)
- Track gauge: 1,435 mm (4 ft 8 1/2 in)

The Holenbrunn–Selb railway was a branch line in Bavaria in southern Germany. It opened on 25 October 1894 initially just between Selb-Plößberg to Selb Untere Stadt. At Selb Untere Stadt this Lokalbahn line branched from the Cheb–Oberkotzau railway that went to Asch and Franzensbad over the border. The railway continued, as a goods line only, to the Hutschenreuther porcelain factory at Ludwigsmühle.

== History ==
On 1 May 1914 the Lokalbahn was extended via Thiersheim to Holenbrunn on the Hof–Marktredwitz line. As a result, the station of Untere Stadt was closed and a new station with goods facilities were built to the north of the town and called Selb Stadt. A small shed (Bahnbetriebswerk), which was maintained by Bw Hof, enabled locomotives to be serviced. Today a small railway museum is housed in this shed.

Numerous industrial sidings ran into the porcelain factories in the vicinity of the town that, like the Rosenthal AG, were worked by their own diesel locomotives or like, Heinrich & Co., with a fireless locomotive that handled goods wagons on the firm’s site.

Cross-border passenger services from Selb-Plößberg to Asch were suspended in 1945 at the end of the Second World War and reopened in 2015. The 12 kilometres (7.5 mi) long section from Selb-Stadt via Höchstädt-Thierstein to Holenbrunn was finally closed in 1986.

When Wunsiedel Stadt station was closed to passenger services, Holenbrunn station was renamed Wunsiedel-Holenbrunn station.
