= Floß =

Floss
- Municipality
- Coat of arms

- Location of Floss within Neustadt a.d.Waldnaab district
- Interactive map of Floss
- Location within Germany Location within Bavaria
- Coordinates: 49°43′N 12°16′E
- Country: Germany
- State: Bavaria
- Admin. region: Oberpfalz
- District: Neustadt a.d.Waldnaab
- Subdivisions: 35 Ortsteile

Government
  - Mayor (2020–26): Robert Lindner (SPD)

Area
  - Total: 54.39 km^{2} (21.00 sq mi)
- Elevation: 487 m (1,598 ft)

Population (2025-12-31)
  - Total: 3,485
  - Density: 64.07/km^{2} (166.0/sq mi)
- Time zone: UTC+01:00 (CET)
  - Summer (DST): UTC+02:00 (CEST)
- Postal codes: 92685
- Dialling codes: 09603
- Vehicle registration: NEW
- Website: www.floss.de

Floß (German pronunciation: [floːs]) is a market town in the Upper Palatinate district of Neustadt an der Waldnaab and has a history of more than 1000 years.

== Geography ==
=== Geographical location ===
The town of Floß is situated on both sides of the Floß river, in a valley approximately 13 kilometers west of the German-Czech border. The market town also extends over the hills that form the north and south banks of the river. In the southeastern part of the town, the Hardtbach river, flows into the Floß. State Road 2395 runs through Floß from Flossenbürg to Neustadt an der Waldnaab.

=== Neighboring municipalities ===
The neighboring towns and municipalities, clockwise, are: Plößberg, Flossenbürg, Waldthurn, Theisseil, Störnstein, and Püchersreuth.

=== Town subdivision ===
The civil parish Floß is composed of 35 official named districts:

- Bergnetsreuth
- Boxdorf
- Diebersreuth
- Diepoltsreuth
- Ellenbach
- Fehrsdorf
- Floß
- Gailertsreuth
- Geiermühle
- Gollwitzerhof
- Gösen
- Grafenreuth
- Hardt
- Hardtheim
- Haupertsreuth
- Höfen
- Kalmreuth
- Konradsreuth
- Kühbach
- Meierhof
- Niedernfloß
- Oberndorf
- Pauschendorf
- Plankenhammer
- Ritzlersreuth
- Schlattein
- Schnepfenhof
- Schönberg
- Schönbrunn
- Steinfrankenreuth
- Weikersmühle
- Welsenhof
- Wilkershof
- Würnreuth
- Würzelbrunn

Within the municipal area, there are the cadastral territories of Bergnetsreuth, Diepoltsreuth, Floß, Gailertsreuth, Gösen (only cadastral part 0), Grafenreuth, Kalmreuth, Schlattein, and Schönbrunn.

== The Name Floß and Its Origin ==
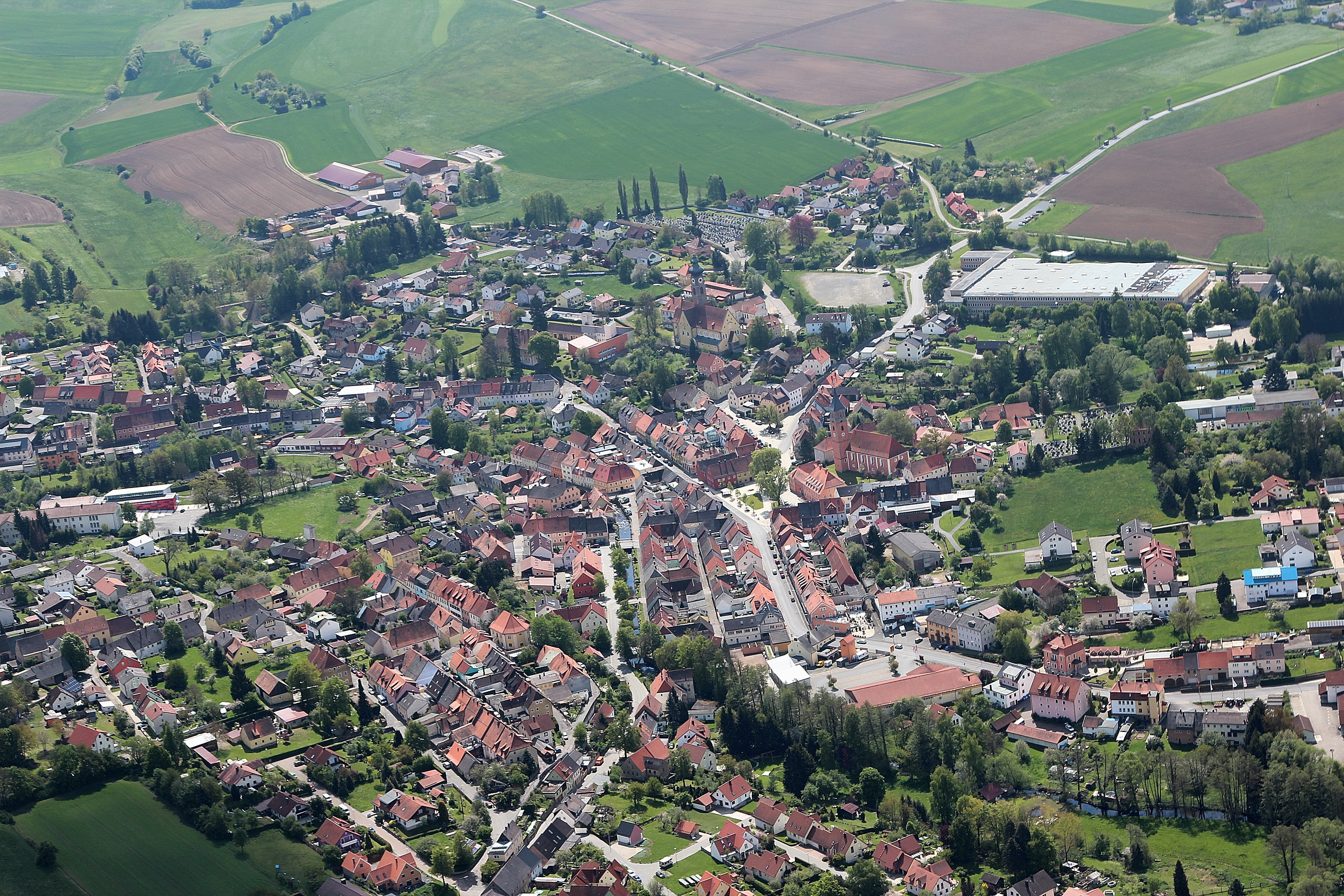
Aerial view of Floß, 2014

=== Variants ===
In the 10th to 15th centuries we see the forms Flozzun, Flossen, Flozze, Floss, Flozze, Flozzam, Flozz Floß, Vlozze and Flôt. There are various views on the origin of the name Floß for both the town of Floß and the Floß river:

=== Celtic origin ===
From around 500 BC to the turn of the era, the Upper Palatinate was inhabited by Celts. Carl Siegert and Wilhelm Brenner-Schäffer consider the Celtic word flathasach = bright, beautiful as the origins of the name.

=== Germanic origin ===
From the turn of the era until around 600 AD, Germanic tribes settled in the Upper Palatinate. From the mid-1st century BC, Elbe Germanic tribes moved from north to south, displacing the Celts. Around 500, the Upper Palatinate belonged to the Thuringian Empire. Several authors (Wolf-Armin von Reitzenstein, Adolf Wolfgang Schuster, Leonhard Bär, Albrecht Greule) assume that the name Floß for the town and the river was given by Germanic settlers. Bär derives Floß from fließen, Fluss, Flözsand, flözen ab (to flow, river, sand deposit, to mine). Reitzenstein assumes an origin from the Germanic word flutō = the flowing.

=== Slavic origin ===
In the 6th century, the Thuringian Empire experienced a decline. Germanic tribes withdrew from the Upper Palatinate. Slavic tribes migrated and settled from around 500 to 900 in the Upper Palatinate up to the Regnitz and Naab rivers. During the Nazi era, it was forbidden to mention this Slavic settlement. This prohibition, until the 1970s, led German archaeologists, against better knowledge, to deny the clearly documented Slavic settlement through excavations and place-name research. Joseph Adelmar Lindner and Johann Baptist Brenner in the 19th century assumed the original Slavic settlement of the northern Upper Palatinate, reflected in numerous place names. They derived Floß from the Slavic word Vlitsche, meaning alley, square, ravine. This explanation would fit well with the location of Floß.

=== Other Assumptions about the Origin of the Name Floß ===
Ernst Schwarz assumes an origin from Old English flot (deep water, sea), as well as Old Icelandic flot (flow, floating fat), and Middle German flot (stream, channel, gutter).

== History ==
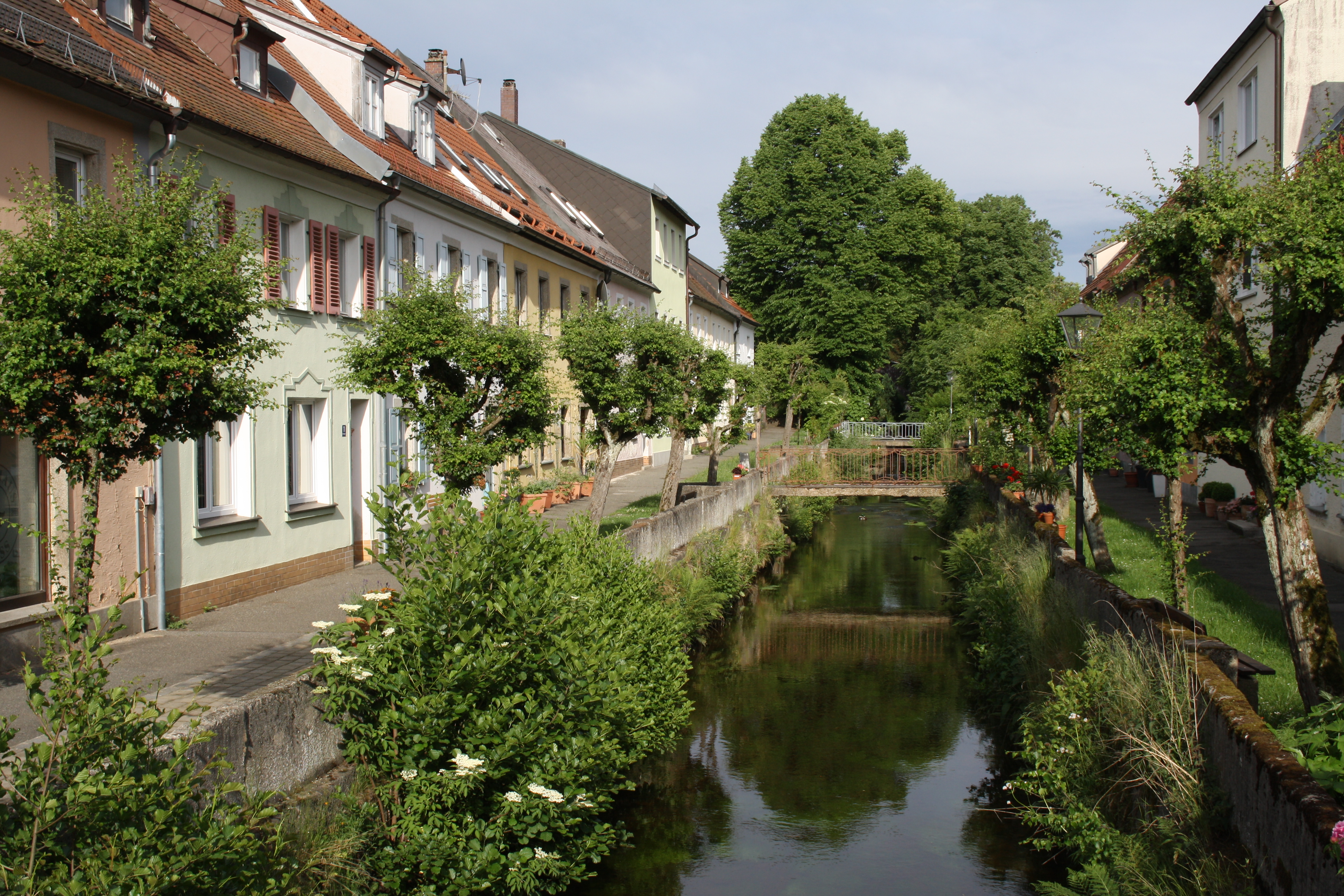
The river in Floß

The villages surrounding Floß are older than Floß itself. Initially, settlements were established on the hills because the river valley was marshy and prone to flooding. Floß was then founded as a trade and administrative center at the old intersection of the road from Weiden via Floß to Plößberg (today: District Road NEW 20 and State Road 2181) and the road from Flossenbürg via Floß to Neustadt an der Waldnaab (today: State Road 2395) in the midst of these ancient villages. The original center of the town was the hill with the old church. The market well, located slightly below, is also a testament to this ancient time. In the 9th and 10th centuries, Bavarian settlers came to the northern Upper Palatinate. During this time, the Office of Floß and the Flosser Burg (Flossenbürg), built for its defense, were established. The first written mention of Floß dates back to the year 948 and mentions a battle of Flozzun, which was victorious for the Bavarians. It is believed that in this battle, Duke Heinrich I of Bavaria defeated the Hungarians near Floß. Since 899, the Hungarians raided their western neighbors almost every year. It was only with the Battle of Lechfeld in 955 and the victory of Otto the Great that these raids came to an end.

=== 12th century to 15th century ===
In the 12th century, Floß belonged to Adelheid von Sulzbach, daughter of Gebhard III of Sulzbach. She was married to Theoderich von Kleve. At the end of the 12th century, she sold Floß to Frederick Barbarossa. The Counts of Sulzbach introduced mining and iron extraction into the Pfreimd and Zottbach regions in the 12th century. The hammer in Floß is first mentioned in 1273. Floß was part of the Staufen imperial property and received a new market privilege in 1421 from its two sovereigns, Margrave Friedrich von Brandenburg and Count Palatine Johann. Since 1438/49, the rule over Floß was in the hands of the Wittelsbachs. A number of sources provide information about the amount of taxes in Floß and its associated villages.

=== 16th century to 19th century ===
In 1505, Floß was assigned to the newly founded Wittelsbach Principality of Junge Pfalz. This was ruled at the time by Count Palatine and Elector Philipp. During the Thirty Years' War, the Floß found itself between two hostile enemies: August von Pfalz-Sulzbach, a Lutheran, fought on the side of the Protestant Union, allied with Gustav II Adolf of Sweden, who marched through Germany with him. Wolfgang Wilhelm von Pfalz-Neuburg, a Catholic, fought on the side of the Catholic League. After the deposition of the Elector of the Palatinate Friedrich V by Emperor Ferdinand II. As a result, the Floß was considered hostile territory by both sides and suffered under the troops of both sides. Floß and its surrounding villages were particularly affected in the years 1620 and 1621 by the passage of Mansfeldian soldiers. During these incursions, farmers were deprived of livestock, grain, clothing, laundry, dishes, tools, etc., and often the farms and buildings were destroyed and burned. An assessment of damages from the year 1621 shows a damage of 1944 Gulden and 19 Kreuzer for the town of Floß. The total damage in Floß was 21403 Gulden and 38 Kreuzer. In 1614, a part of Junge Pfalz became the newly founded Duchy of Pfalz-Sulzbach. Pfalz-Sulzbach included Sulzbach, Floß, and a part of Parkstein-Weiden. In 1656, Pfalz-Sulzbach became an independent, sovereign territory through the Neuburger Hauptvergleich. This means that the ruler over Pfalz-Sulzbach only had real sovereignty over his territory after 1656. This ruler was Pfalzgraf Christian August, known for his religious tolerance. In 1656, he became Duke of Pfalz-Sulzbach through the Neuburger settlement.

In 1684, Duke Christian August allowed the settlement of four Jewish families in Floß. They founded the Jewish community of Floß. Beginning in 1687, the Jews settled on the northern slope of Floß. Their settlement was called Judenberg and formed a ghetto and a politically independent community. Only in 1870 was this Judenberg community absorbed into the town of Floß.

In 1777, Floß became part of the Wittelsbach Duchy of Neuburg-Sulzbach and later belonged to Bavaria, possessing its own market court with magisterial rights.

=== 20th century ===
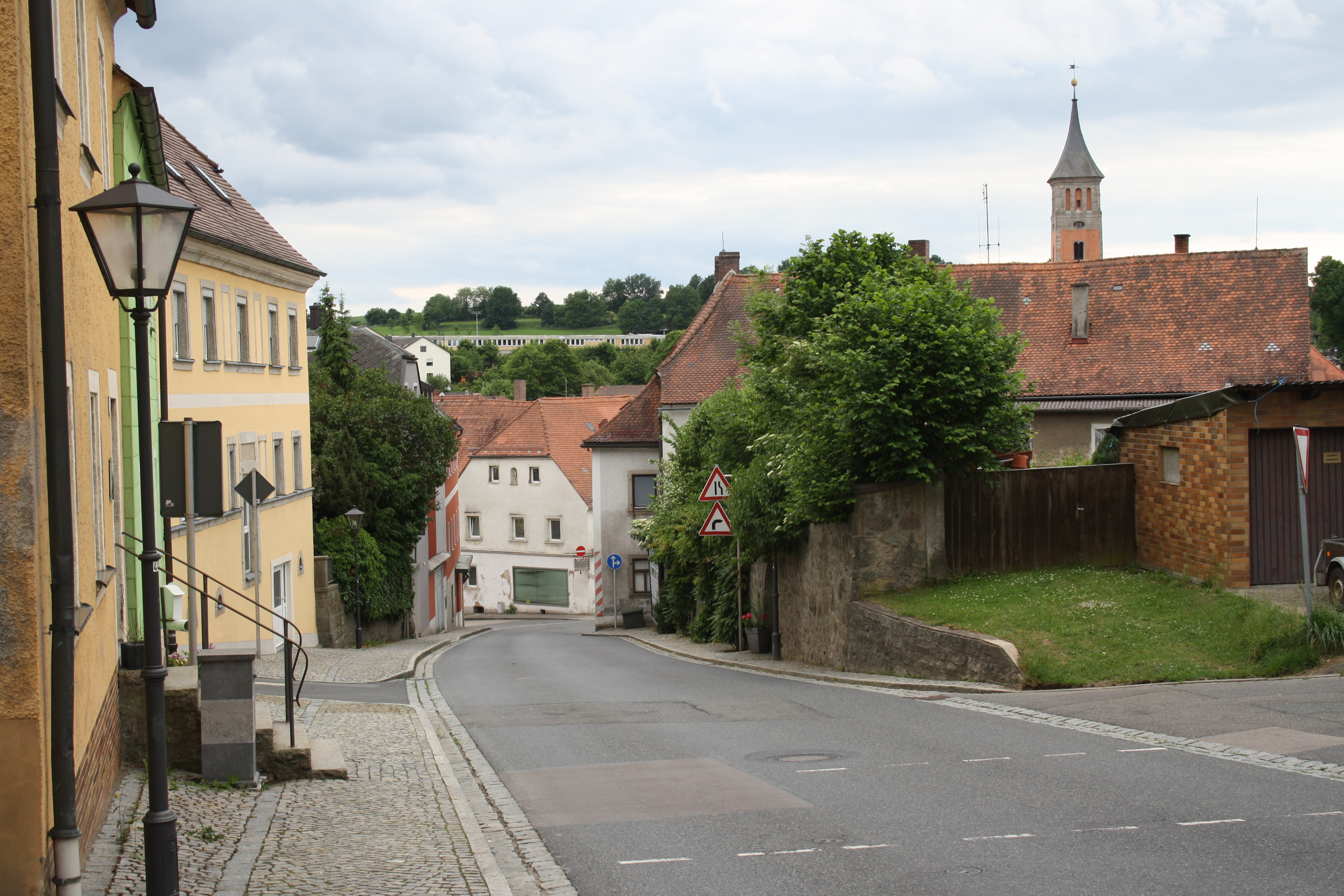
Old street with Church of St. Johannes Baptist in the background

At the end of World War II in April 1945, the death marches of concentration camp prisoners from Flossenbürg concentration camp to Dachau concentration camp began. On April 17, 1945, around 2,000 Jewish prisoners were transported by train from Flossenbürg concentration camp. The train was attacked by an American low-flying aircraft at Floß station. The SS jumped out of the train and took cover, while the prisoners had to stay on the train. Some prisoners were killed in the attack, and some managed to escape. The locomotive was shot. The next day, it continued towards Weiden with a new locomotive.

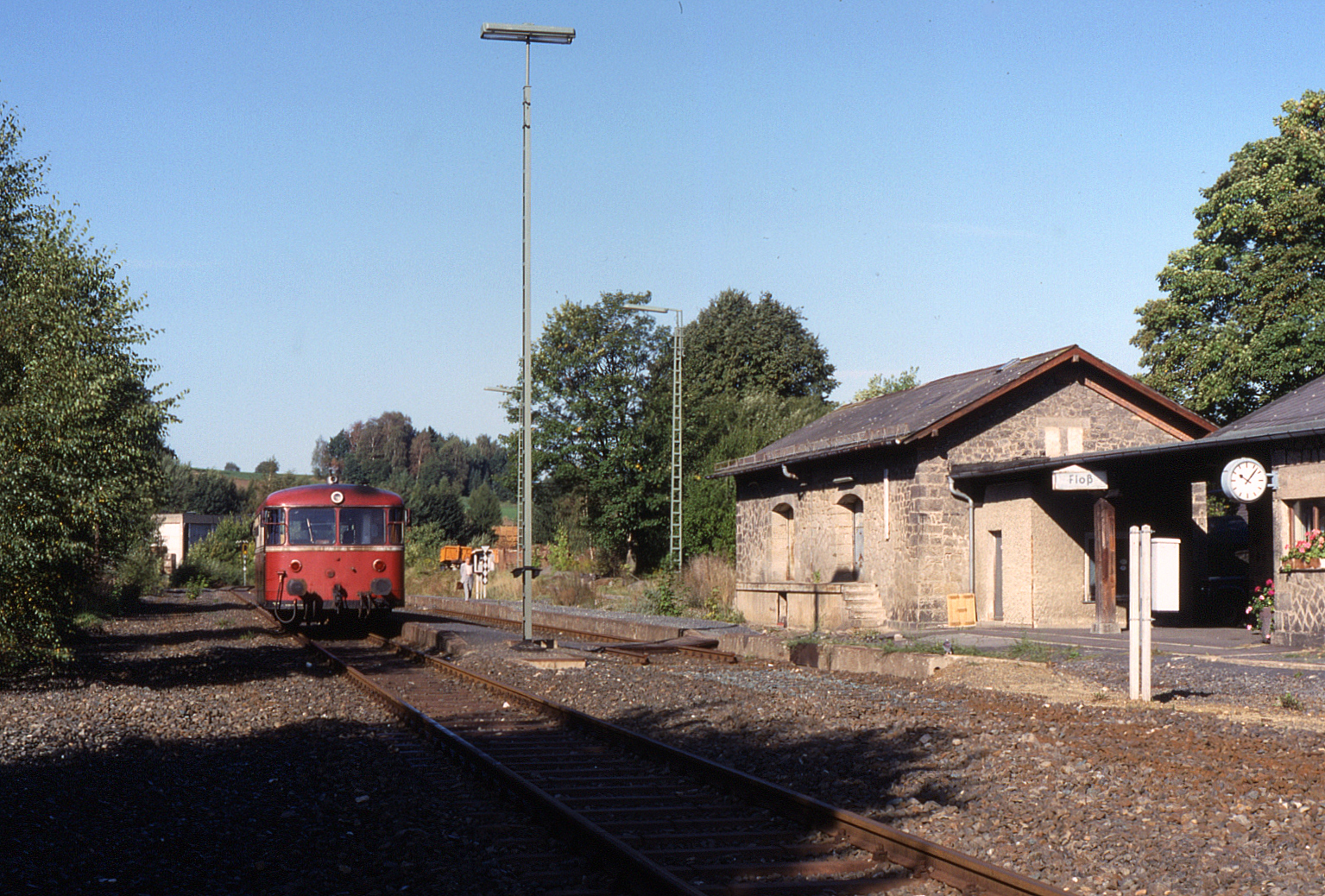
Train in Floß station

=== Municipal mergers ===
As part of the territorial reform in Bavaria, on January 1, 1972, the municipalities of Bergnetsreuth, Gailertsreuth (including Diepoltsreuth, which was incorporated on April 1, 1949), Gösen, Grafenreuth, Schlattein, and Schönbrunn were integrated.

=== Changes to population ===
Between 1988 and 2018, the population decreased from 3,639 to 3,465, a decrease of 174, or 4.8%.

== Coat of arms ==
Blazon: In Gold aus blauen Wellen wachsend ein rot gekrönter schwarzer Adler.
Heraldic animal is a in gold out from blue waves rising red crowned black spread eagle. The emblem is known since the 14th century.

== Places of interest ==
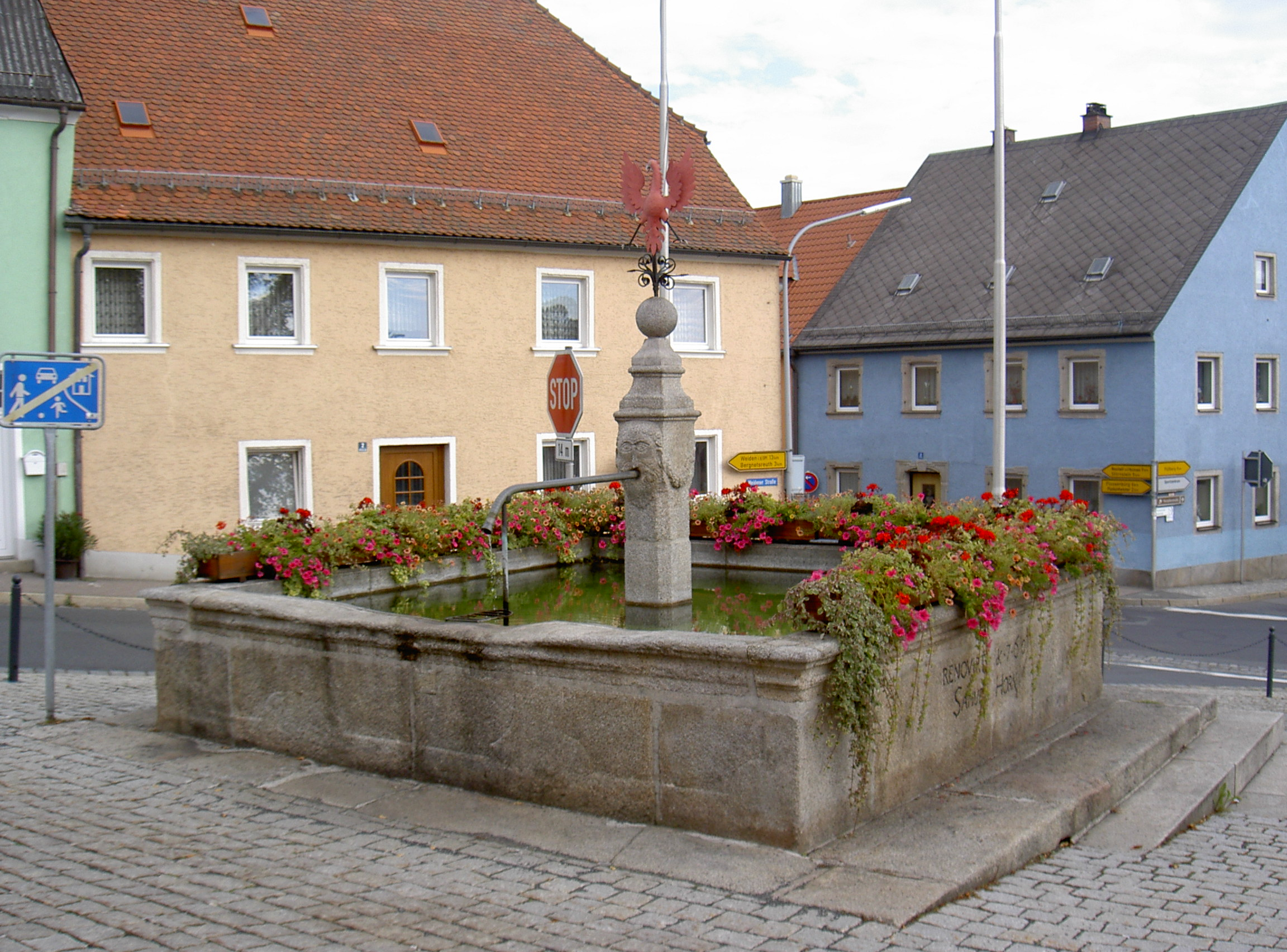
Floß market fountain from the 16th/17th century

- The Synagogue, built 1817, vandalised at Crystal Night 1938 and renovated in 1980. It is only occasionally used for religious service by Jewish community of Weiden.
- The Jewish Cemetery, with its oldest decipherable granite headstone from 1692. There are 33 concentration camp victims laid to rest.
- Saint Nikolaus Church, pilgrimage site on Nikolaus Hill.
- Saint John Baptist Church (Lutheran), partially from 16th century.
- Saint John The Baptist Church (Roman Catholic), built from 1910 to 1912.
- Cemetery with 121 victims of the neighbouring concentration camp Flossenbürg
- The Doost, a geotope with round ice-aged granite boulder in the middle of the forest.
- Castle ruin Haselstein, built by 1400, at Floß's backyard mountain.
- In the middle of nature reserve Upper Palatine Forest, well known for its castle ruins, quarries and a European network of rambling trails.

Nowadays Floß is on the Castle Route from Mannheim to Prague and the Golden Route from Nuremberg to Prague as well it is one station of the 1,570 km (980 mi) EuroVelo cycling route from Prague in the Czech Republic to Paris in France.

=== Cultural events ===
A kermesse (Kirchweih or Kirwa in German) is held on the last Sunday in August, known as Bartholomew Sunday in commemoration of Bartholomew the Apostle. The event is known far beyond the village borders. It is organised on an annually alternating basis by two young men's clubs, the Cylinder-Club and the Floss und Umgebung.

=== Notable people ===
- Lazar Horowitz (1803–1868), Rabbi in Vienna
- Joseph Lindner (1825–1879), church minister, member of Landtag and Reichstag
- David Ludwig Bloch (1910–2002), Jewish emigrant to China and the US, noted as a painter
- Richard Baer (1911–1963), National Socialist and SS, commandant of Auschwitz concentration and extermination camp
- Petra Horneber (21 April 1965), sport shooter

== Gallery ==
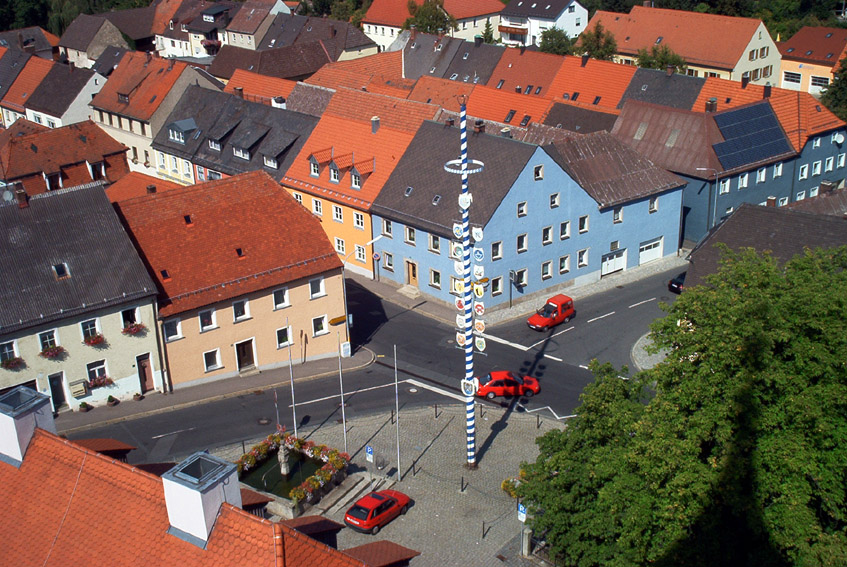
Floß

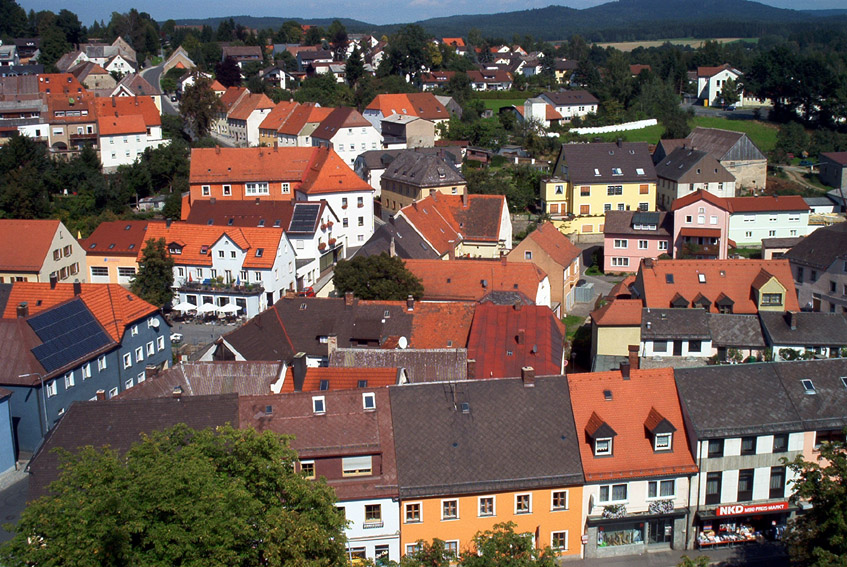
Floß

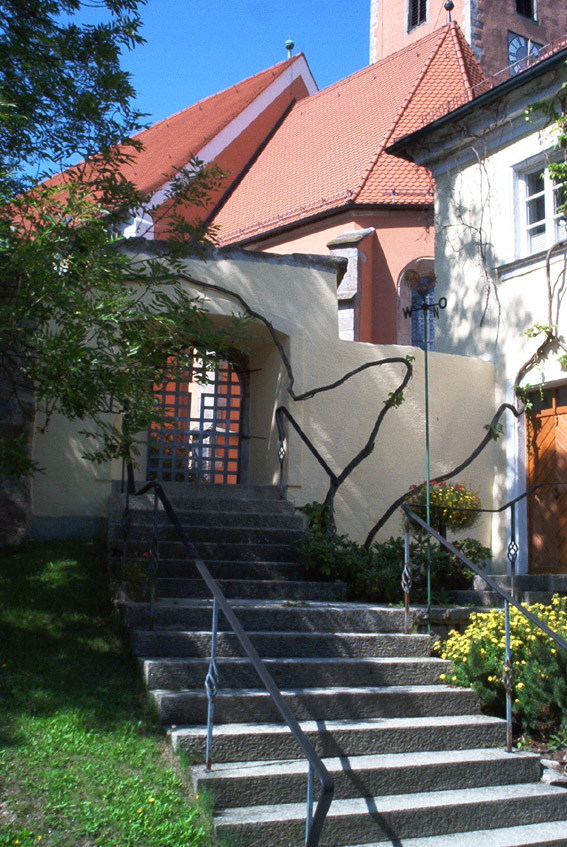
Side Door of Saint John Baptist

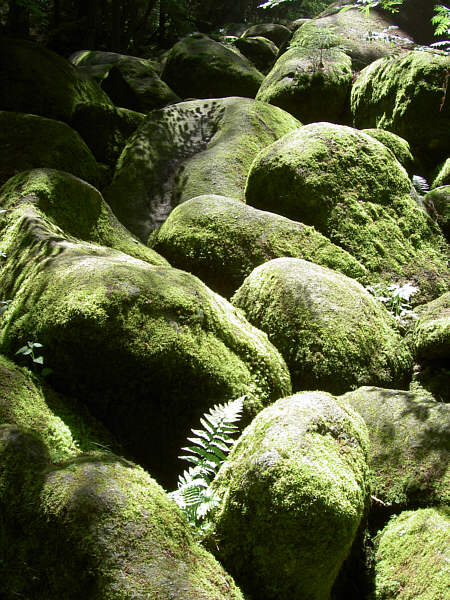
The Doost
