= Franz Bock (SA-Obergruppenführer) =

German Nazi SA general (1905–1974)

Führer, SA-Gruppe Niederrhein
- In office 1 February 1942 – 8 May 1945
- Preceded by: Heinrich Knickmann
- Succeeded by: Position abolished

Chief, Office of Group Schools Supreme SA Leadership (OSAF)
- In office 1 December 1938 – 31 January 1942
- SA-Stabschef: Viktor Lutze

Chief, Office of Social Welfare Supreme SA Leadership (OSAF)
- In office 1 November 1937 – 30 November 1938
- SA-Stabschef: Viktor Lutze

Additional positions
- 1943–1945: Prussian Provincial Councilor
- 1936–1945: Reichstag Deputy
- 1935–1937: Düsseldorf City Councilor

Personal details
- Born: Franz Bock; 28 June 1905 Kaltenbrunn, Kingdom of Bavaria, German Empire
- Died: 10 May 1974 (aged 68) Cologne, North Rhine-Westphalia, West Germany
- Party: Nazi Party
- Other political affiliations: Greater German People's Community
- Occupation: Commercial clerk
- Civilian awards: Blood Order; Golden Party Badge

Military service
- Allegiance: Nazi Germany
- Branch/service: German Army
- Years of service: 1940–1944
- Rank: Oberleutnant of reserves
- Unit: Infantry Regiment 409
- Battles/wars: World War II; Battle of France
- Military awards: Iron Cross, 1st & 2nd class War Merit Cross, 1st and 2nd class with swords

Franz Bock (28 June 1905 – 10 May 1974) was a German SA-Obergruppenführer who served in the Supreme SA Leadership of the Sturmabteilung, the paramilitary organization of the Nazi Party. He was also a politician and served in the Reichstag from 1936 to 1945.

== Early life ==
Bock was born in Kaltenbrunn (today, Weiherhammer) in the Neustadt an der Waldnaab district of Bavaria. He attended the local Volksschule and a humanistic Gymnasium. He completed a commercial apprenticeship in banking between 1920 and 1922. He then worked as a commercial clerk in the tobacco industry in Munich from 1922 to 1927 and in the ceramics industry in Worms until 1932.

== Career in the Nazi Party Sturmabteilung ==
Bock joined the Sturmabteilung (SA) on 24 November 1922 and, on 9 November 1923, he took part in Adolf Hitler's Beer Hall Putsch in Munich, for which he later was awarded the Blood Order. In 1927, Bock was assigned to the SA-Sturm in Worms, advancing to Truppführer on 1 June 1929. He was commissioned as an SA-Sturmführer on 26 January 1930, and was given command of this unit.

In January 1932, he became a full-time SA officer and, on 1 July, was made the adjutant to SA-Gruppe West in Koblenz. Between February and July 1933, he served as the adjutant to the SA-Obergruppen in Koblenz and Ingolstadt. From July 1933 to October 1934, he was the chief of staff to SA-Gruppe Bayerische Ostmark in Regensburg. He next commanded the SA-Jägerstandarte (light infantry regiment) in Traunstein through February 1935. On 1 March 1935, he was appointed Fuhrer of SA-Brigade 75 in the Gladbach-Rheydt area, a component of the SA-Gruppe Niederrhein, based in Düsseldorf.

On 1 March 1937, Bock left his field command to take up a post in the Supreme SA Leadership (OSAF), where he became a department head in the SA Personnel Office. On 1 November of the same year, he was made head of the Office of Social Welfare and, from 1 December 1938 to 31 January 1942, he was the Chief of the Office of Group Schools in the Educational Main Office, overseeing all SA training centers. On 1 February 1942, Bock returned to an SA field command as Fuhrer of SA-Gruppe Niederrhein with its headquarters in Düsseldorf. At the end of September 1944, he was put in charge of organizing the Volkssturm (the Nazi Party militia) in Gau Düsseldorf under Gauleiter and Reich Defense Commissioner Friedrich Karl Florian. The next month, Bock was formally appointed Gaustabsführer (Gau staff leader) for this unit. On 9 November 1944, he was promoted to SA-Obergruppenführer, among the last known promotions to this rank. He retained these posts until Germany's surrender in May 1945.

=== SA ranks ===
SA ranks
Date	Rank
1 June 1929	SA-Truppführer
26 January 1930	SA-Sturmführer
1 May 1931	SA-Sturmbannführer
17 December 1932	SA-Standartenführer
1 July 1933	SA-Oberführer
20 April 1935	SA-Brigadeführer
9 November 1938	SA-Gruppenführer
9 November 1944	SA-Obergruppenführer

== Political career ==
Bock joined the Nazi Party on 3 January 1923, becoming a member of the Munich Ortsgroup (local group). When the Party was banned in the aftermath of the Munich putsch, he joined the Greater German People's Community, a Nazi Party front organization. He re-enrolled in the Party on 6 March 1926 (membership number 33,014), following the lifting of the ban. As an early Party member, he would later be awarded the Golden Party Badge. Bock served as a city councilor in Düsseldorf from October 1935 to January 1937. From 29 March 1936 until the fall of the Nazi regime in May 1945, he also sat as a deputy of the Reichstag for electoral constituency 22 (Düsseldorf East). In 1943, he also was appointed as a Prussian Provincial Councilor for the Rhine Province.

== Wartime military service and post-war life ==
Following the outbreak of the Second World War, Bock volunteered for the German Army on 10 May 1940. He entered service as an Unteroffizier of reserves and was promoted to Oberleutnant on 2 January 1943. He participated in the Battle of France with Infantry Regiment 409 and was awarded the Iron Cross, 1st and 2nd class and the War Merit Cross, 1st and 2nd class with swords. He was discharged from the army on 5 May 1944.

The SA was among the Nazi groups that were indicted as being criminal organizations at the Nuremberg trials. Bock testified as a defense witness on 12–13 August 1946, concerning the development and organization of the SA. In his testimony, he downplayed the SA's use of physical violence. Little else is documented of Bock's post-war life. He died in Cologne on 10 May 1974.

== Sources ==
- Franz Bock entry in Die Rheinland-Pfälzische Personendatenbank
- Information about Franz Bock (SA-Obergruppenführer) in the Reichstag database
- Lilla, Joachim; Doring, Martin; Schulz, Andreas (2004). Statisten in Uniform: Die Mitglieder des Reichstags 1933–1945. Ein biographisches Handbuch. Unter Einbeziehung der völkischen und nationalsozialistischen Reichstagsabgeordneten ab Mai 1924. Droste. p. 46. ISBN 978-3-770-05254-7.
- Miller, Michael D.; Schulz, Andreas (2015). Leaders of the Storm Troops. Vol. 1. Solihull, England: Helion & Company. ISBN 978-1-909-98287-1.
- Siemens, Daniel (2017). Stormtroopers: A New History of Hitler's Brownshirts. New Haven: Yale University Press. ISBN 978-0-300-19681-8.
- Stockhorst, Erich (1985). 5000 Köpfe: Wer War Was im 3. Reich. Arndt. p.64. ISBN 978-3-887-41116-9.
- Zentner, Christian; Bedürftig, Friedemann, eds. (1997) [1991]. The Encyclopedia of the Third Reich. New York: Da Capo Press. ISBN 978-0-306-80793-0.
