= David Bloch =

David Bloch may refer to:

- David Bloch-Blumenfeld (1887–1947), or David Bloch, mayor of Tel Aviv, 1925–1927
- David Ludwig Bloch (1910–2002), German-Jewish American lithographer and painter
