= Parkstein (hill) =

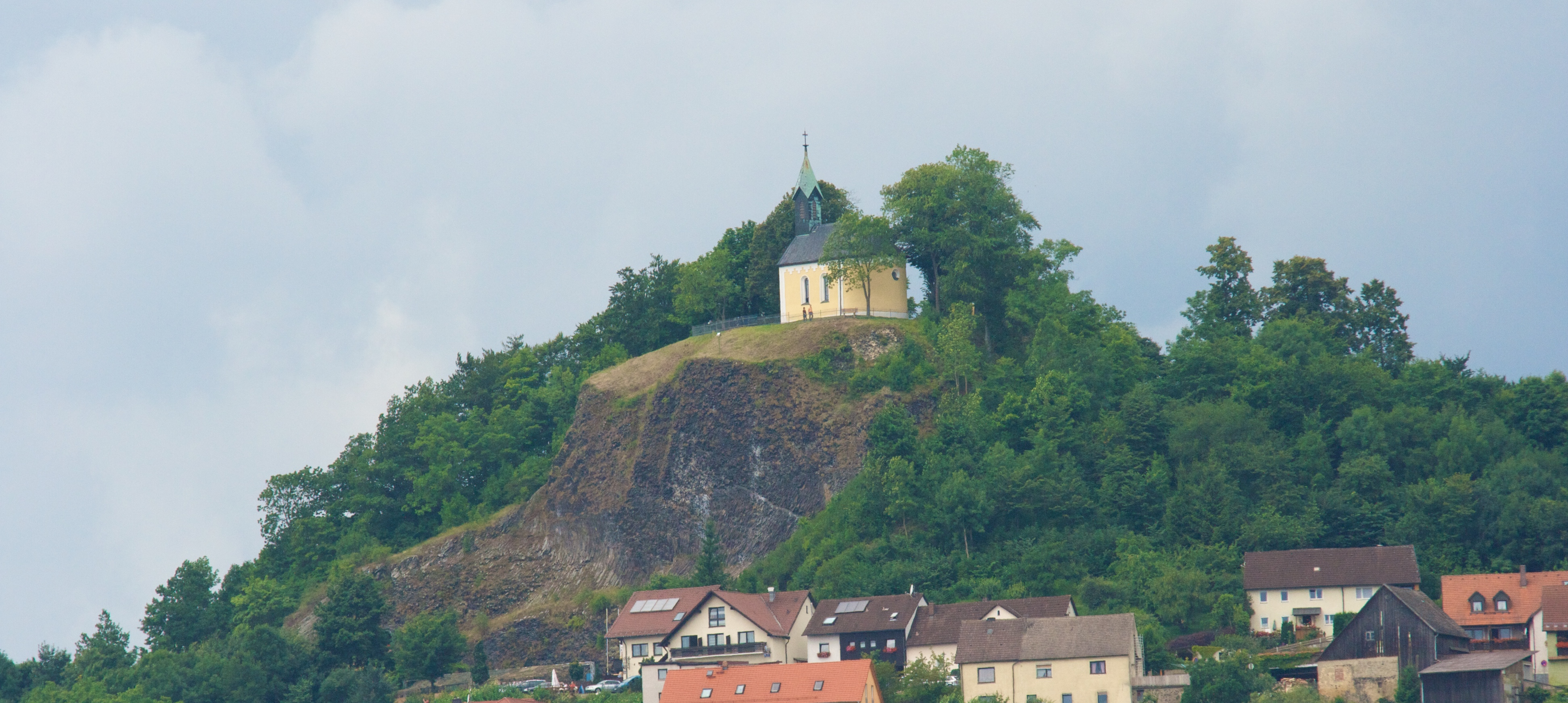

Highest point
- Elevation: 595 m (1,952 ft)
- Coordinates: 49°43′55″N 12°04′12″E

Geography
- Location within Bavaria
- Location: Bavaria, Germany
- Parent range: Upper Palatine Forest

Geology
- Mountain type: Rock summit
- Rock type: basalt

The Parkstein, also called the Hoher Parkstein and Basaltkegel Hoher Parkstein is a well-known local hill and tourist destination in the Steinwald Mountains of central Germany. It lies 10 kilometres (6.2 mi) northwest of Weiden in der Oberpfalz in the district of Neustadt a.d.Waldnaab and is one of the most popular walking and daytripper destinations in North Upper Palatinate. Around the volcanically-formed hill, which is 595 metres (1,952 ft) above sea level (N.N.), is the village of the same name, Parkstein. At one time a castle (Parkstein Castle) stood on the summit.

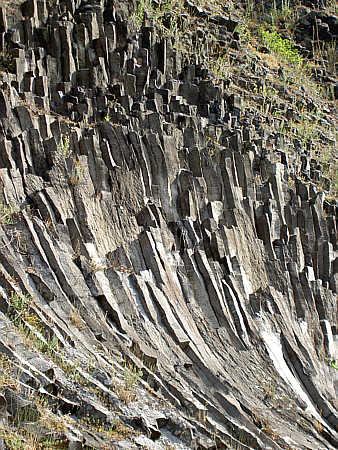
Basalt columns on the Parkstein

The Parkstein is famous for its impressive basalt outcrop. This basalt formation consists of pentagonal and hexagonal columns, up to one metre high, whose shafts extend into the earth to a depth of up to 30 metres. It is part of an old stream of lava that has been exposed at the surface after the softer rock above it had been weathered away over the course of millions of years. The wall of basalt measures 38 metres.

Alexander von Humboldt viewed the Parkstein as the "most beautiful basalt cone in Europe".

In 2004 it was entered by the Free State of Bavaria as No. 20 on the list of the 100 "most beautiful geotopes in Bavaria".
