= Schirmitz (Verwaltungsgemeinschaft) =

- Verwaltungsgemeinschaft
- Location of Schirmitz within Neustadt an der Waldnaab district
- Interactive map of Schirmitz
- Location within Germany Location within Bavaria
- Coordinates: 49°39′N 12°10′E
- Country: Germany
- State: Bavaria
- Admin. region: Upper Palatinate
- District: Neustadt an der Waldnaab
- Seat: Schirmitz
- Subdivisions: 4 municipalities

Area
  - Total: 41.2 km^{2} (15.9 sq mi)

Population (2025-12-31)
  - Total: 6,772
  - Density: 164/km^{2} (426/sq mi)
- Time zone: UTC+01:00 (CET)
  - Summer (DST): UTC+02:00 (CEST)
- Website: www.vgem-schirmitz.de

Schirmitz is a Verwaltungsgemeinschaft (municipal association) in the district of Neustadt an der Waldnaab in Bavaria, Germany. Its seat is in Schirmitz.

It consists of the following municipalities:

1. Bechtsrieth
2. Irchenrieth
3. Pirk
4. Schirmitz
