= Kirchendemenreuth =

- Municipality
- Coat of arms

- Location of Kirchendemenreuth within Neustadt a.d.Waldnaab district
- Interactive map of Kirchendemenreuth
- Location within Germany Location within Bavaria
- Coordinates: 49°46′N 12°5′E
- Country: Germany
- State: Bavaria
- Admin. region: Oberpfalz
- District: Neustadt a.d.Waldnaab
- Municipal assoc.: Neustadt an der Waldnaab

Government
  - Mayor (2020–26): Gerhard Kellner (CSU)

Area
  - Total: 39.30 km^{2} (15.17 sq mi)
- Elevation: 579 m (1,900 ft)

Population (2025-12-31)
  - Total: 926
  - Density: 23.6/km^{2} (61.0/sq mi)
- Time zone: UTC+01:00 (CET)
  - Summer (DST): UTC+02:00 (CEST)
- Postal codes: 92665
- Dialling codes: 09681
- Vehicle registration: NEW
- Website: www.kirchendemenreuth.de

Kirchendemenreuth is a municipality in the district of Neustadt an der Waldnaab in Bavaria, Germany. It includes the village (Dorf) of Steinreuth.
