= Manfred Schiller =

German politician (born 1961)

Manfred Leonhard Schiller

Member of the Bundestag
- Incumbent
- Assumed office July 2024

Personal details
- Born: 23 September 1961 (age 64) Schirmitz
- Party: AfD

Manfred Leonhard Schiller (born 23 September 1961 in Schirmitz) is a German politician from the Alternative for Germany. He has been a Member of the German Bundestag since July 2024.

== See also ==
- List of members of the 20th Bundestag
