= Vorbach =

- Municipality
- Coat of arms

- Location of Vorbach within Neustadt a.d.Waldnaab district
- Interactive map of Vorbach
- Location within Germany Location within Bavaria
- Coordinates: 49°49′N 11°45′E
- Country: Germany
- State: Bavaria
- Admin. region: Upper Palatinate
- District: Neustadt a.d.Waldnaab
- Municipal assoc.: Kirchenthumbach

Government
  - Mayor (2020–26): Alexander Goller (CSU)

Area
  - Total: 13.52 km^{2} (5.22 sq mi)
- Elevation: 445 m (1,460 ft)

Population (2025-12-31)
  - Total: 1,088
  - Density: 80.47/km^{2} (208.4/sq mi)
- Time zone: UTC+01:00 (CET)
  - Summer (DST): UTC+02:00 (CEST)
- Postal codes: 95519
- Dialling codes: 09205
- Vehicle registration: NEW

Vorbach is a municipality in the district of Neustadt an der Waldnaab in Bavaria in Germany.
