= Schwarzenbach, Upper Palatinate =

Schwarzenbach
- Municipality
- Coat of arms

- Location of Schwarzenbach within Neustadt a.d.Waldnaab district
- Interactive map of Schwarzenbach
- Location within Germany Location within Bavaria
- Coordinates: 49°44′N 12°0′E
- Country: Germany
- State: Bavaria
- Admin. region: Oberpfalz
- District: Neustadt a.d.Waldnaab
- Municipal assoc.: Pressath

Government
  - Mayor (2020–26): Thorsten Hallmann (SPD)

Area
  - Total: 11.91 km^{2} (4.60 sq mi)
- Elevation: 414 m (1,358 ft)

Population (2025-12-31)
  - Total: 1,124
  - Density: 94.37/km^{2} (244.4/sq mi)
- Time zone: UTC+01:00 (CET)
  - Summer (DST): UTC+02:00 (CEST)
- Postal codes: 92720
- Dialling codes: 09644
- Vehicle registration: NEW
- Website: www.schwarzenbach-online.de

Schwarzenbach (German pronunciation: [ˈʃvaʁtsn̩bax]) is a municipality in the district of Neustadt an der Waldnaab in Bavaria, Germany.
