= Neustadt an der Waldnaab (Verwaltungsgemeinschaft) =

- Verwaltungsgemeinschaft
- Location of Neustadt an der Waldnaab within Neustadt an der Waldnaab district
- Interactive map of Neustadt an der Waldnaab
- Location within Germany Location within Bavaria
- Coordinates: 49°44′N 12°10′E
- Country: Germany
- State: Bavaria
- Admin. region: Upper Palatinate
- District: Neustadt an der Waldnaab
- Seat: Neustadt an der Waldnaab
- Subdivisions: 5 municipalities

Area
  - Total: 127.67 km^{2} (49.29 sq mi)

Population (2025-12-31)
  - Total: 7,827
  - Density: 61.31/km^{2} (158.8/sq mi)
- Time zone: UTC+01:00 (CET)
  - Summer (DST): UTC+02:00 (CEST)
- Website: www.vgem-neustadt.de

Neustadt an der Waldnaab is a Verwaltungsgemeinschaft (municipal association) in the district of Neustadt an der Waldnaab in Bavaria, Germany. Its seat is in Neustadt an der Waldnaab, itself not part of the Verwaltungsgemeinschaft.

It consists of the following municipalities:

1. Kirchendemenreuth
2. Parkstein
3. Püchersreuth
4. Störnstein
5. Theisseil
