= Trabitz =

- Municipality
- Coat of arms

- Location of Trabitz within Neustadt a.d.Waldnaab district
- Interactive map of Trabitz
- Location within Germany Location within Bavaria
- Coordinates: 49°48′06″N 11°53′44″E
- Country: Germany
- State: Bavaria
- Admin. region: Oberpfalz
- District: Neustadt a.d.Waldnaab
- Municipal assoc.: Pressath
- Subdivisions: 20 Ortsteile

Government
  - Mayor (2020–26): Carmen Pepiuk (CSU)

Area
  - Total: 26.96 km^{2} (10.41 sq mi)
- Elevation: 455 m (1,493 ft)

Population (2025-12-31)
  - Total: 1,316
  - Density: 48.81/km^{2} (126.4/sq mi)
- Time zone: UTC+01:00 (CET)
  - Summer (DST): UTC+02:00 (CEST)
- Postal codes: 92724
- Dialling codes: 09644
- Vehicle registration: NEW, ESB, VOH
- Website: https://www.trabitz.de/

Trabitz is a municipality in the district of Neustadt an der Waldnaab in Bavaria, Germany.

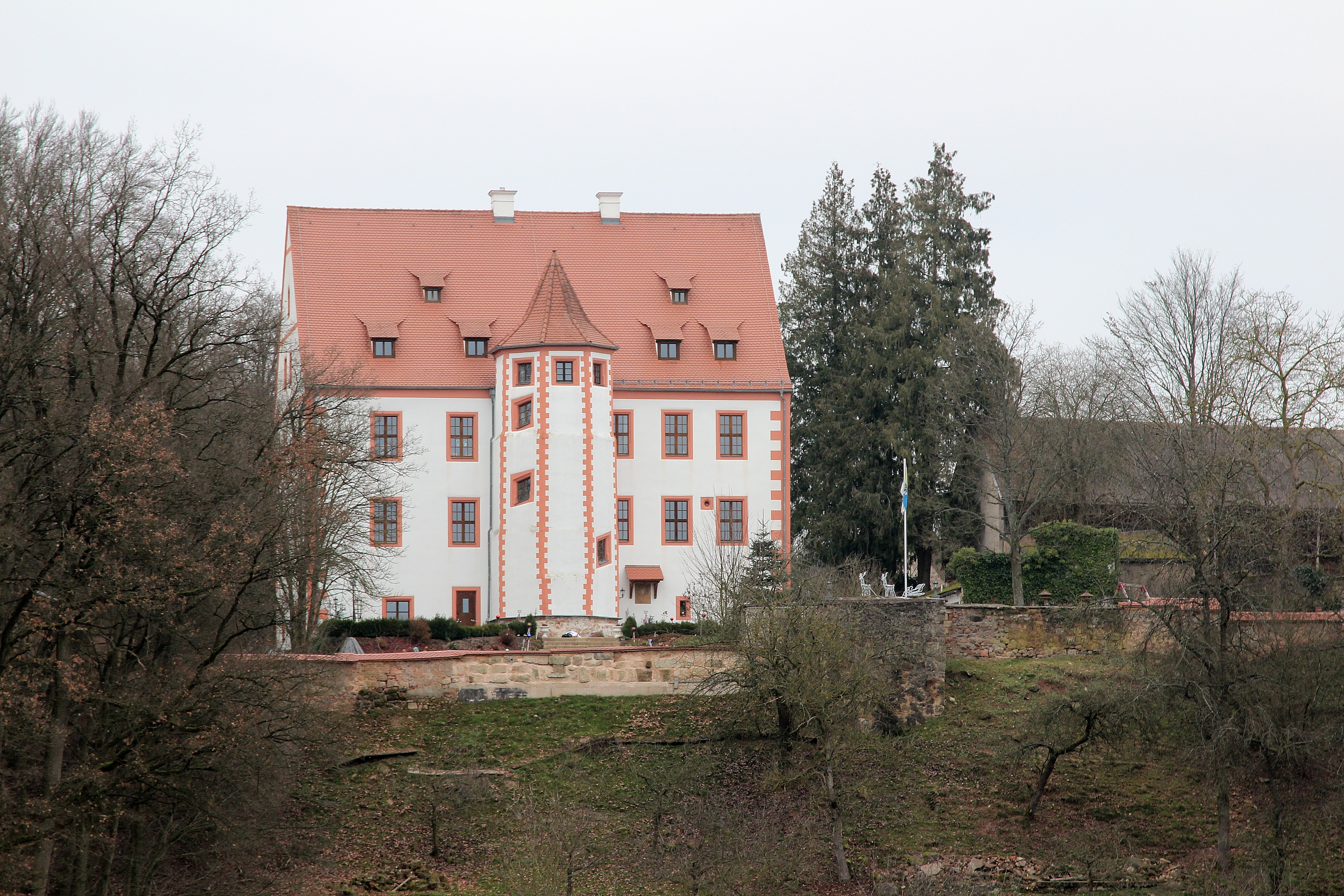
Weihersberg castle (district Weihersberg)

== Mayor ==
Carmen Pepiuk (born 1969) (CSU) is the mayor since May 2014. She was re-elected in 2020.
