= Pressath (Verwaltungsgemeinschaft) =

- Verwaltungsgemeinschaft
- Location of Pressath within Neustadt an der Waldnaab district
- Interactive map of Pressath
- Location within Germany Location within Bavaria
- Coordinates: 49°46′N 11°56′E
- Country: Germany
- State: Bavaria
- Admin. region: Upper Palatinate
- District: Neustadt an der Waldnaab
- Seat: Pressath
- Subdivisions: 3 municipalities

Area
  - Total: 104.92 km^{2} (40.51 sq mi)

Population (2025-12-31)
  - Total: 6,589
  - Density: 62.80/km^{2} (162.7/sq mi)
- Time zone: UTC+01:00 (CET)
  - Summer (DST): UTC+02:00 (CEST)
- Website: www.pressath.de

Pressath is a Verwaltungsgemeinschaft (municipal association) in the district of Neustadt an der Waldnaab in Bavaria, Germany. Its seat is in Pressath.

It consists of the following municipalities:

1. Pressath
2. Schwarzenbach
3. Trabitz
