= Weiherhammer (Verwaltungsgemeinschaft) =

- Verwaltungsgemeinschaft
- Location of Weiherhammer within Neustadt an der Waldnaab district
- Interactive map of Weiherhammer
- Location within Germany Location within Bavaria
- Coordinates: 49°38′N 12°04′E
- Country: Germany
- State: Bavaria
- Admin. region: Upper Palatinate
- District: Neustadt an der Waldnaab
- Seat: Weiherhammer
- Subdivisions: 3 municipalities

Area
  - Total: 87.05 km^{2} (33.61 sq mi)

Population (2025-12-31)
  - Total: 6,684
  - Density: 76.78/km^{2} (198.9/sq mi)
- Time zone: UTC+01:00 (CET)
  - Summer (DST): UTC+02:00 (CEST)
- Website: vgweiherhammer.de

Weiherhammer is a Verwaltungsgemeinschaft (municipal association) in the district of Neustadt an der Waldnaab in Bavaria, Germany. Its seat is in Weiherhammer.

It consists of the following municipalities:

1. Etzenricht
2. Kohlberg
3. Weiherhammer
