= Pirk =

- Municipality
- Coat of arms

- Location of Pirk within Neustadt a.d.Waldnaab district
- Interactive map of Pirk
- Location within Germany Location within Bavaria
- Coordinates: 49°38′N 12°10′E
- Country: Germany
- State: Bavaria
- Admin. region: Oberpfalz
- District: Neustadt a.d.Waldnaab
- Municipal assoc.: Schirmitz

Government
  - Mayor (2020–26): Dietmar Schaller

Area
  - Total: 26.17 km^{2} (10.10 sq mi)
- Elevation: 397 m (1,302 ft)

Population (2025-12-31)
  - Total: 1,910
  - Density: 73.0/km^{2} (189/sq mi)
- Time zone: UTC+01:00 (CET)
  - Summer (DST): UTC+02:00 (CEST)
- Postal codes: 92712
- Dialling codes: 0961
- Vehicle registration: NEW
- Website: www.gemeinde-pirk.de

Pirk is a municipality in the district of Neustadt an der Waldnaab in Bavaria, Germany.
