= Kohlberg, Bavaria =

Kohlberg
- Municipality
- Coat of arms

- Location of Kohlberg within Neustadt a.d.Waldnaab district
- Interactive map of Kohlberg
- Location within Germany Location within Bavaria
- Coordinates: 49°36′N 12°01′E
- Country: Germany
- State: Bavaria
- Admin. region: Oberpfalz
- District: Neustadt a.d.Waldnaab
- Municipal assoc.: Weiherhammer

Government
  - Mayor (2020–26): Gerhard List (CSU)

Area
  - Total: 33.52 km^{2} (12.94 sq mi)
- Elevation: 482 m (1,581 ft)

Population (2025-12-31)
  - Total: 1,194
  - Density: 35.62/km^{2} (92.26/sq mi)
- Time zone: UTC+01:00 (CET)
  - Summer (DST): UTC+02:00 (CEST)
- Postal codes: 92702
- Dialling codes: 09608
- Vehicle registration: NEW
- Website: www.kohlberg-opf.de

Kohlberg (German pronunciation: [ˈkoːlbɛʁk]) is a municipality in the district of Neustadt an der Waldnaab in Bavaria, Germany. It is situated c. 17 km (11 mi) southwest of Weiden in der Oberpfalz and c. 10 km (6.2 mi) northeast of Hirschau.
