= Kirchenthumbach =

- Municipality
- Coat of arms

- Location of Kirchenthumbach within Neustadt a.d.Waldnaab district
- Interactive map of Kirchenthumbach
- Location within Germany Location within Bavaria
- Coordinates: 49°45′N 11°43′E
- Country: Germany
- State: Bavaria
- Admin. region: Oberpfalz
- District: Neustadt a.d.Waldnaab
- Municipal assoc.: Kirchenthumbach

Government
  - Mayor (2020–26): Jürgen Kürzinger (SPD)

Area
  - Total: 67.46 km^{2} (26.05 sq mi)
- Elevation: 467 m (1,532 ft)

Population (2025-12-31)
  - Total: 3,249
  - Density: 48.16/km^{2} (124.7/sq mi)
- Time zone: UTC+01:00 (CET)
  - Summer (DST): UTC+02:00 (CEST)
- Postal codes: 91281
- Dialling codes: 09647
- Vehicle registration: NEW
- Website: www.vg-kirchenthumbach.de

Kirchenthumbach is a municipality in the district of Neustadt an der Waldnaab in Bavaria, Germany.
