= Pressath =

- Town
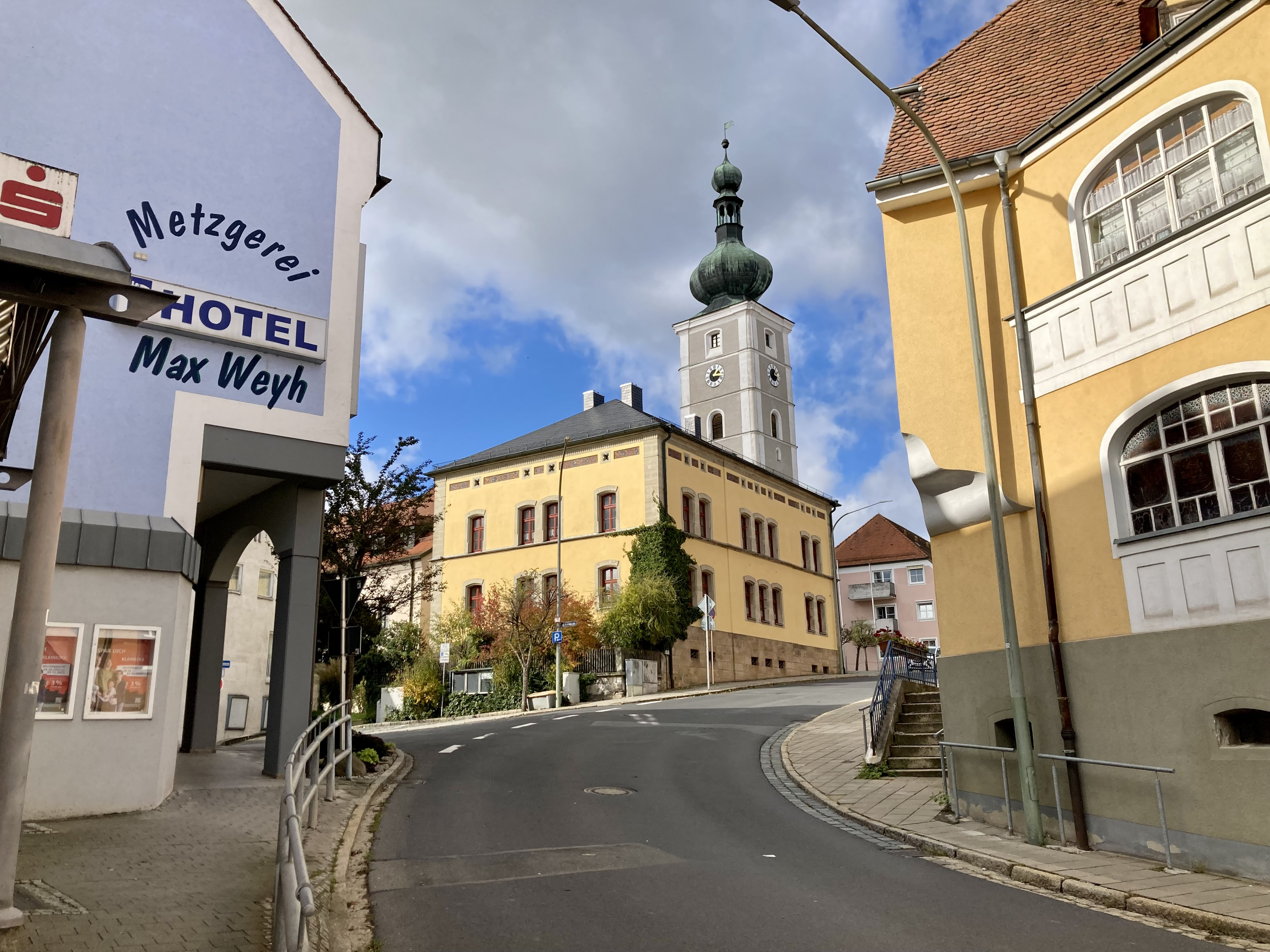
- Pressath, Germany

- Coat of arms

- Location of Pressath within Neustadt a.d.Waldnaab district
- Interactive map of Pressath
- Location within Germany Location within Bavaria
- Coordinates: 49°46′N 11°55′E
- Country: Germany
- State: Bavaria
- Admin. region: Oberpfalz
- District: Neustadt a.d.Waldnaab
- Municipal assoc.: Pressath

Government
  - Mayor (2020–26): Bernhard Stangl (SPD)

Area
  - Total: 66.34 km^{2} (25.61 sq mi)
- Elevation: 435 m (1,427 ft)

Population (2025-12-31)
  - Total: 4,149
  - Density: 62.54/km^{2} (162.0/sq mi)
- Time zone: UTC+01:00 (CET)
  - Summer (DST): UTC+02:00 (CEST)
- Postal codes: 92690
- Dialling codes: 09644
- Vehicle registration: NEW
- Website: www.pressath.de

Pressath (German pronunciation: [ˈpʁɛsaːt]) is a town in the district of Neustadt an der Waldnaab, in Bavaria, Germany. Pressath was founded in 1657. It is situated 20 km northwest of Weiden in der Oberpfalz and ca. 7 km north of Grafenwöhr.
