= Irchenrieth =

- Municipality
- Coat of arms

- Location of Irchenrieth within Neustadt a.d.Waldnaab district
- Interactive map of Irchenrieth
- Location within Germany Location within Bavaria
- Coordinates: 49°37′N 12°14′E
- Country: Germany
- State: Bavaria
- Admin. region: Oberpfalz
- District: Neustadt a.d.Waldnaab
- Municipal assoc.: Schirmitz

Government
  - Mayor (2020–26): Josef Hammer (CSU)

Area
  - Total: 5.27 km^{2} (2.03 sq mi)
- Elevation: 425 m (1,394 ft)

Population (2025-12-31)
  - Total: 1,699
  - Density: 322/km^{2} (835/sq mi)
- Time zone: UTC+01:00 (CET)
  - Summer (DST): UTC+02:00 (CEST)
- Postal codes: 92699
- Dialling codes: 09659
- Vehicle registration: NEW
- Website: www.irchenrieth.de

Irchenrieth is a municipality in the district of Neustadt an der Waldnaab in Bavaria in Germany.
