= Schirmitz =

- Municipality
- Coat of arms

- Location of Schirmitz within Neustadt a.d.Waldnaab district
- Interactive map of Schirmitz
- Location within Germany Location within Bavaria
- Coordinates: 49°38′N 12°10′E
- Country: Germany
- State: Bavaria
- Admin. region: Oberpfalz
- District: Neustadt a.d.Waldnaab
- Municipal assoc.: Schirmitz

Government
  - Mayor (2020–26): Ernst Lenk (CSU)

Area
  - Total: 4.96 km^{2} (1.92 sq mi)
- Elevation: 393 m (1,289 ft)

Population (2025-12-31)
  - Total: 2,107
  - Density: 425/km^{2} (1,100/sq mi)
- Time zone: UTC+01:00 (CET)
  - Summer (DST): UTC+02:00 (CEST)
- Postal codes: 92718
- Dialling codes: 0961
- Vehicle registration: NEW
- Website: www.schirmitz.de

Schirmitz is a municipality in the district of Neustadt an der Waldnaab in Bavaria, Germany.

== People ==
- Manfred Schiller (born 1961), politician
