= Kirchenthumbach (Verwaltungsgemeinschaft) =

- Verwaltungsgemeinschaft
- Location of Kirchenthumbach within Neustadt an der Waldnaab district
- Interactive map of Kirchenthumbach
- Location within Germany Location within Bavaria
- Coordinates: 49°45′N 11°44′E
- Country: Germany
- State: Bavaria
- Admin. region: Upper Palatinate
- District: Neustadt an der Waldnaab
- Seat: Kirchenthumbach
- Subdivisions: 3 municipalities

Area
  - Total: 101.29 km^{2} (39.11 sq mi)

Population (2025-12-31)
  - Total: 5,201
  - Density: 51.35/km^{2} (133.0/sq mi)
- Time zone: UTC+01:00 (CET)
  - Summer (DST): UTC+02:00 (CEST)
- Website: verwaltungsgemeinschaft-kirchenthumbach.de

Kirchenthumbach is a Verwaltungsgemeinschaft (municipal association) in the district of Neustadt an der Waldnaab in Bavaria, Germany. Its seat is in Kirchenthumbach.

It consists of the following municipalities:

1. Kirchenthumbach
2. Schlammersdorf
3. Vorbach
