= Bechtsrieth =

- Municipality
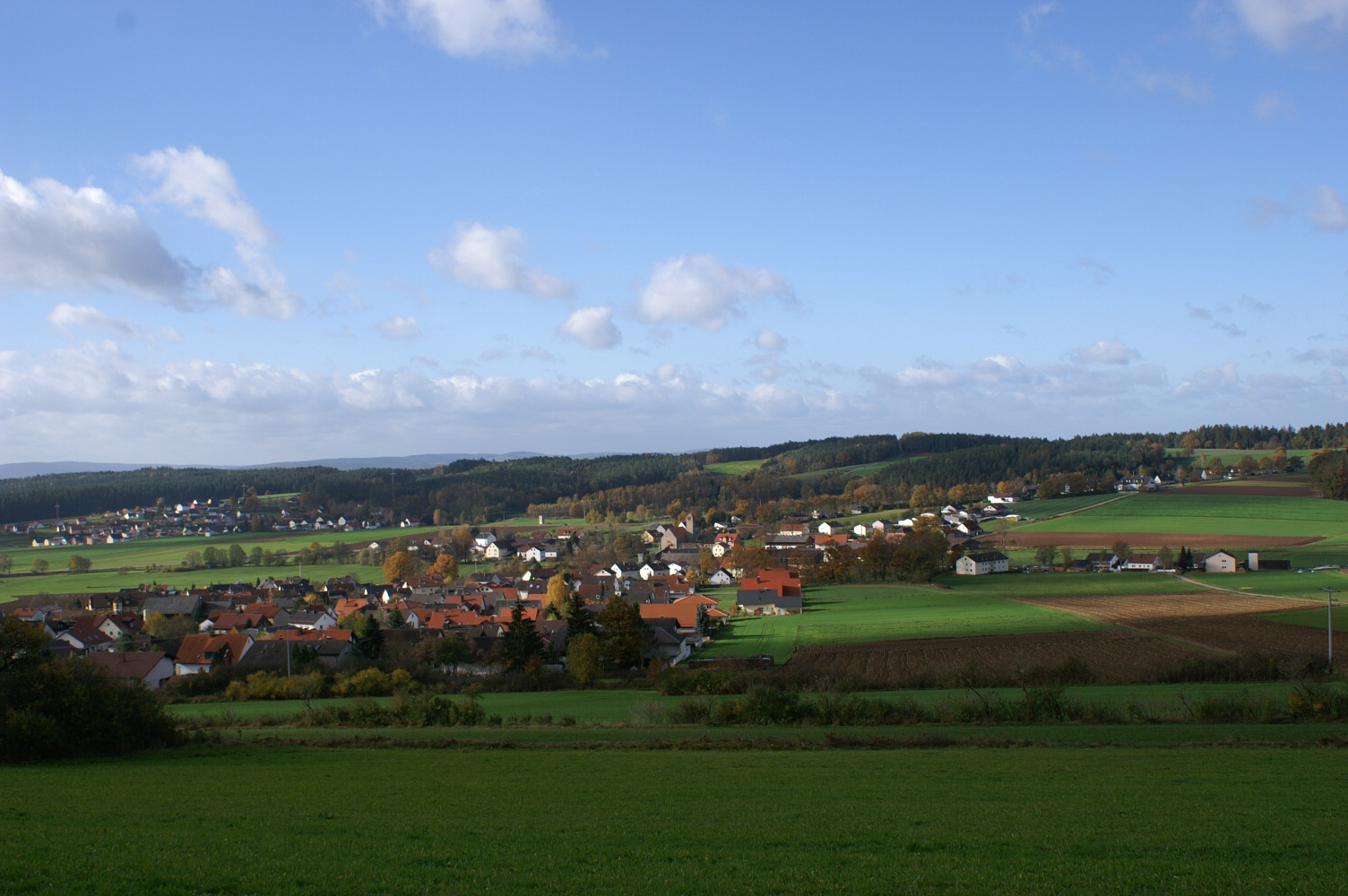

- Coat of arms

- Location of Bechtsrieth within Neustadt a.d.Waldnaab district
- Interactive map of Bechtsrieth
- Location within Germany Location within Bavaria
- Coordinates: 49°38′47″N 12°12′44″E
- Country: Germany
- State: Bavaria
- Admin. region: Oberpfalz
- District: Neustadt a.d.Waldnaab
- Municipal assoc.: Schirmitz
- Subdivisions: 2 Ortsteile

Government
  - Mayor (2020–26): Markus Ziegler (CSU)

Area
  - Total: 4.78 km^{2} (1.85 sq mi)
- Elevation: 452 m (1,483 ft)

Population (2025-12-31)
  - Total: 1,056
  - Density: 221/km^{2} (572/sq mi)
- Time zone: UTC+01:00 (CET)
  - Summer (DST): UTC+02:00 (CEST)
- Postal codes: 92699
- Dialling codes: 0961
- Vehicle registration: NEW
- Website: www.bechtsrieth.de

Bechtsrieth is a municipality in the administrative district of Neustadt an der Waldnaab in Bavaria in Germany. It has 1,051 inhabitants, of which the males make up 48.6% (511) and the females, 51.4% (540).
