= Püchersreuth =

- Municipality
- Coat of arms

- Location of Püchersreuth within Neustadt a.d.Waldnaab district
- Interactive map of Püchersreuth
- Location within Germany Location within Bavaria
- Coordinates: 49°45′N 12°14′E
- Country: Germany
- State: Bavaria
- Admin. region: Oberpfalz
- District: Neustadt a.d.Waldnaab
- Municipal assoc.: Neustadt an der Waldnaab

Government
  - Mayor (2020–26): Rudolf Schopper

Area
  - Total: 25.21 km^{2} (9.73 sq mi)
- Elevation: 499 m (1,637 ft)

Population (2025-12-31)
  - Total: 1,698
  - Density: 67.35/km^{2} (174.4/sq mi)
- Time zone: UTC+01:00 (CET)
  - Summer (DST): UTC+02:00 (CEST)
- Postal codes: 92715
- Dialling codes: 09602
- Vehicle registration: NEW

Püchersreuth is a municipality in the district of Neustadt an der Waldnaab in Bavaria, Germany.
