= Theisseil =

- Municipality
- Coat of arms

- Location of Theisseil within Neustadt a.d.Waldnaab district
- Interactive map of Theisseil
- Location within Germany Location within Bavaria
- Coordinates: 49°42′N 12°14′E
- Country: Germany
- State: Bavaria
- Admin. region: Oberpfalz
- District: Neustadt a.d.Waldnaab
- Municipal assoc.: Neustadt an der Waldnaab

Government
  - Mayor (2022–28): Johannes Kett (CSU)

Area
  - Total: 21.40 km^{2} (8.26 sq mi)
- Elevation: 557 m (1,827 ft)

Population (2025-12-31)
  - Total: 1,204
  - Density: 56.26/km^{2} (145.7/sq mi)
- Time zone: UTC+01:00 (CET)
  - Summer (DST): UTC+02:00 (CEST)
- Postal codes: 92637
- Dialling codes: 09602 0961
- Vehicle registration: NEW

Theisseil is a municipality in the district of Neustadt an der Waldnaab in Bavaria, Germany.
