= Weiherhammer =

- Municipality
- Coat of arms

- Location of Weiherhammer within Neustadt a.d.Waldnaab district
- Interactive map of Weiherhammer
- Location within Germany Location within Bavaria
- Coordinates: 49°38′N 12°4′E
- Country: Germany
- State: Bavaria
- Admin. region: Oberpfalz
- District: Neustadt a.d.Waldnaab
- Municipal assoc.: Weiherhammer

Government
  - Mayor (2020–26): Ludwig Biller (CSU)

Area
  - Total: 39.89 km^{2} (15.40 sq mi)
- Elevation: 394 m (1,293 ft)

Population (2025-12-31)
  - Total: 3,934
  - Density: 98.62/km^{2} (255.4/sq mi)
- Time zone: UTC+01:00 (CET)
  - Summer (DST): UTC+02:00 (CEST)
- Postal codes: 92729
- Dialling codes: 09605
- Vehicle registration: NEW
- Website: www.weiherhammer.de

Weiherhammer is a municipality in the district of Neustadt an der Waldnaab in Bavaria, Germany.

== History ==
Weiherhammer, originally Beckendorf, belonged to the Wittelsbach duchy Neuburg-Sulzbach. Since 1777 it was the a part of the Bavaria electorate. In 1934 Beckendorf was renamed Weiherhammer and received communal autonomy in 1952. In 1972 Dürnast and Trippach were incorporated into Weiherhammer.

== Population ==
In 1970 the population was 3,406; in 1987, 3,655; and in 2000, 4,199.

== Industry ==
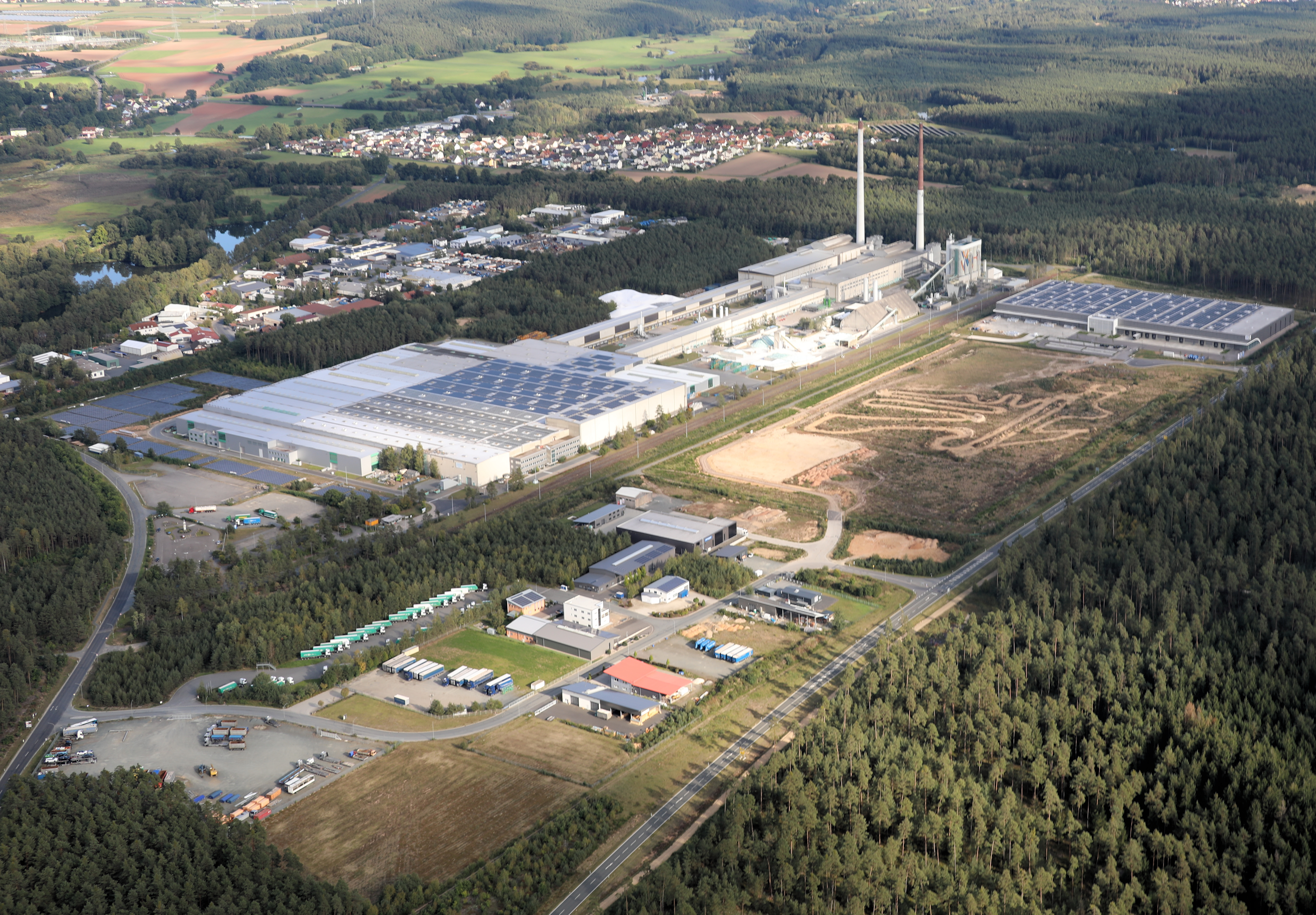
Pilkington Float Glass Factory 2023

- Located on the edges of town, Pilkington Float Glass Factory, which is also a local landmark as it has two 140 m (460 ft) tall chimneys, and BHS Corrugated, a producer of corrugating rolls.
