= David Ludwig Bloch =

German-born American lithographer and painter (1910–2002)

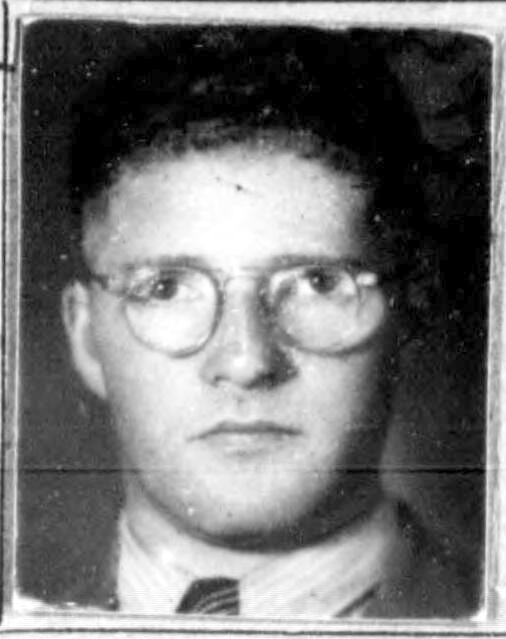
- Shanghai identity card photo, dated 1944
- Born: March 25, 1910; Floß, Bavaria, Germany
- Died: September 12, 2002 (aged 92); Barrytown, New York, U.S.
- Education: State Academy of Applied Arts, Munich
- Spouse: Lilly Cheng Disiu

David Ludwig Bloch (March 25, 1910 – September 16, 2002) was a German-Jewish American lithographer and painter.

During Kristallnacht, Bloch was arrested and sent to the Dachau concentration camp for four weeks. Despite the fact that he was deaf, he was released from the camp and was able to escape to Shanghai in 1940. After immigrating to the United States in 1949, his artwork focused on the horrors of the Holocaust.

== Early life and education ==
David Ludwig Bloch was born March 25, 1910, in Floss, Bavaria, where his middle-class family had lived for many generations. His parents, Simon and Selma Ansbacher Bloch, both died before Bloch had turned two years old. He was raised by his grandmother, with the help of a nanny.

Bloch was deafened by meningitis when he was one year old. At age five, he was enrolled in a school for the deaf in Munich, Die Konigliche Bayrische Taubstummen Anstalt, graduating in 1923. He then attended a school for the deaf in Jena, where he undertook an apprenticeship as a china decorator at a porcelain factory in Planken Hammer. From 1927 to 1930, Bloch attended the Technical School of the Porcelain Industry in Selb. After graduating, he worked as a pattern painter at the Bauscher Brothers porcelain factory in Weiden, but became unemployed in October 1932 due to a lack of orders at the factory.

With the help of a scholarship, Bloch became a student at the State Academy of Applied Arts in Munich in 1934, where he studied under graphic designer Fritz Helmuth Ehmcke. His training was focused on woodcuts as well as drawing and watercolors. He interrupted his studies in 1936 to earn money as a graphic designer and poster painter at the department store Sallinger in Straubing; in October 1938, the department store was "Aryanized", and Bloch was fired. He returned to his studies in November 1938, but after a short time back at the academy he was banned from further studies because he was Jewish.

== Career ==
=== Imprisonment at Dachau and escape to Shanghai ===
During Kristallnacht, Bloch was arrested and sent to the Dachau concentration camp; he spent four weeks there in "protective custody". After his release, he found work with the master painter Heinz Voges in Munich. He remained there until an American cousin arranged his passage from Munich to Venice to Shanghai in April 1940.

In Shanghai, Bloch joined almost 20,000 European Jews who had managed to escape persecution. He worked as a commercial illustrator and was financially supported by his family in the United States.

Bloch was inspired by his new surroundings to create impressionistic and naturalistic watercolors and woodcuts of Shanghai street scenes.

His first solo exhibit was in Shanghai in 1941. His artwork highlighted the struggles of the peddlers, beggars, and rickshaw pullers of the city, and documented the challenging living conditions of his stateless refugee community in the Shanghai Ghetto.

While there he met and married Lilly Cheng Disiu (1916–1987), a deaf Chinese woman.

=== Move to the United States ===
In March 1949, as the Chinese Communist Party under Mao took control of China, Bloch and his wife, Lilly, left Shanghai to immigrate to the United States, with the help of an American-Jewish organization for displaced persons.

They settled in Mount Vernon, New York, and had two sons, Daniel and Dean. Bloch worked for 27 years as an art lithographer for Commercial Decal, a large printing company for ceramic decals, retiring in 1975. During the presidency of Lyndon B. Johnson, Bloch designed china for the White House that depicted the U.S. state flowers.

==== Retirement years ====
After retiring, Bloch returned to Germany in 1976 for the first time after his forced emigration, including visiting the Dachau concentration camp. Afterwards, his artwork focused heavily on the Holocaust, including a series of large-format acrylic paintings titled From A (Adolf Hitler) to Z (Zyklon B). His work was exhibited at the YIVO Institute and at the Jewish Museum in Fürth, Germany. His work was displayed in the exhibit Flight and Rescue in Shanghai, 1938–1949, at the United States Holocaust Memorial Museum in 2000. In 2000, a one-man retrospective of his work was held at the Jewish Museum Munich commemorating his 90th birthday.

=== Honors ===
He received the Kulturpreis from the German Federation of the Deaf in 1997. The David-Ludwig Bloch School in Essen, Germany, is a deaf school named after Bloch.

== Death ==
Bloch died September 16, 2002, in Barrytown, New York.
