= Parkstein =

- Municipality
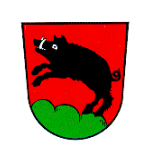
- Coat of arms

- Location of Parkstein within Neustadt a.d.Waldnaab district
- Interactive map of Parkstein
- Location within Germany Location within Bavaria
- Coordinates: 49°43′N 12°4′E
- Country: Germany
- State: Bavaria
- Admin. region: Oberpfalz
- District: Neustadt a.d.Waldnaab
- Municipal assoc.: Neustadt an der Waldnaab
- Subdivisions: 13 Ortsteile

Government
  - Mayor (2020–26): Reinhard Sollfrank

Area
  - Total: 30.84 km^{2} (11.91 sq mi)
- Elevation: 547 m (1,795 ft)

Population (2025-12-31)
  - Total: 2,441
  - Density: 79.15/km^{2} (205.0/sq mi)
- Time zone: UTC+01:00 (CET)
  - Summer (DST): UTC+02:00 (CEST)
- Postal codes: 92711
- Dialling codes: 09602
- Vehicle registration: NEW
- Website: www.parkstein.de

Parkstein (German pronunciation: [ˈpaʁkʃtaɪn]; Northern Bavarian: Parkstoa) is a municipality in the district of Neustadt an der Waldnaab in Bavaria in Germany. In 2020, it counted approximately 2,300 inhabitants. The origins of its castle, built atop a conical shaped mountain, also called the Parkstein, date back to around the year 1000. A first written account of its existence can be traced back to the year 1053 in the documentations of the monks of Niederalteich of the Reichstag in Merseburg. Parkstein was chartered in 1435.

Most likely in November 1796, Alexander von Humboldt called the 24-million-year-old basalt formation the most beautiful he had encountered in Europe. According to the Bavarian State Geology Office, during the Cenozoic, from Paleocene to the Pliocene epochs, a number of active volcanoes produced liquid magma in Northern Bavaria, mostly due to the continental collision of Europe and Africa. As a result, not only the Alps but a number of fissures and cracks began to form throughout central Europe where magma could rise. Most of the Parkstein's magma cooled below the surface, leading to the crystalline column formation that is now exposed as a result of erosion.
