= Donaustauf Castle =

- Burg bei Donaustauf
- Donaustauf
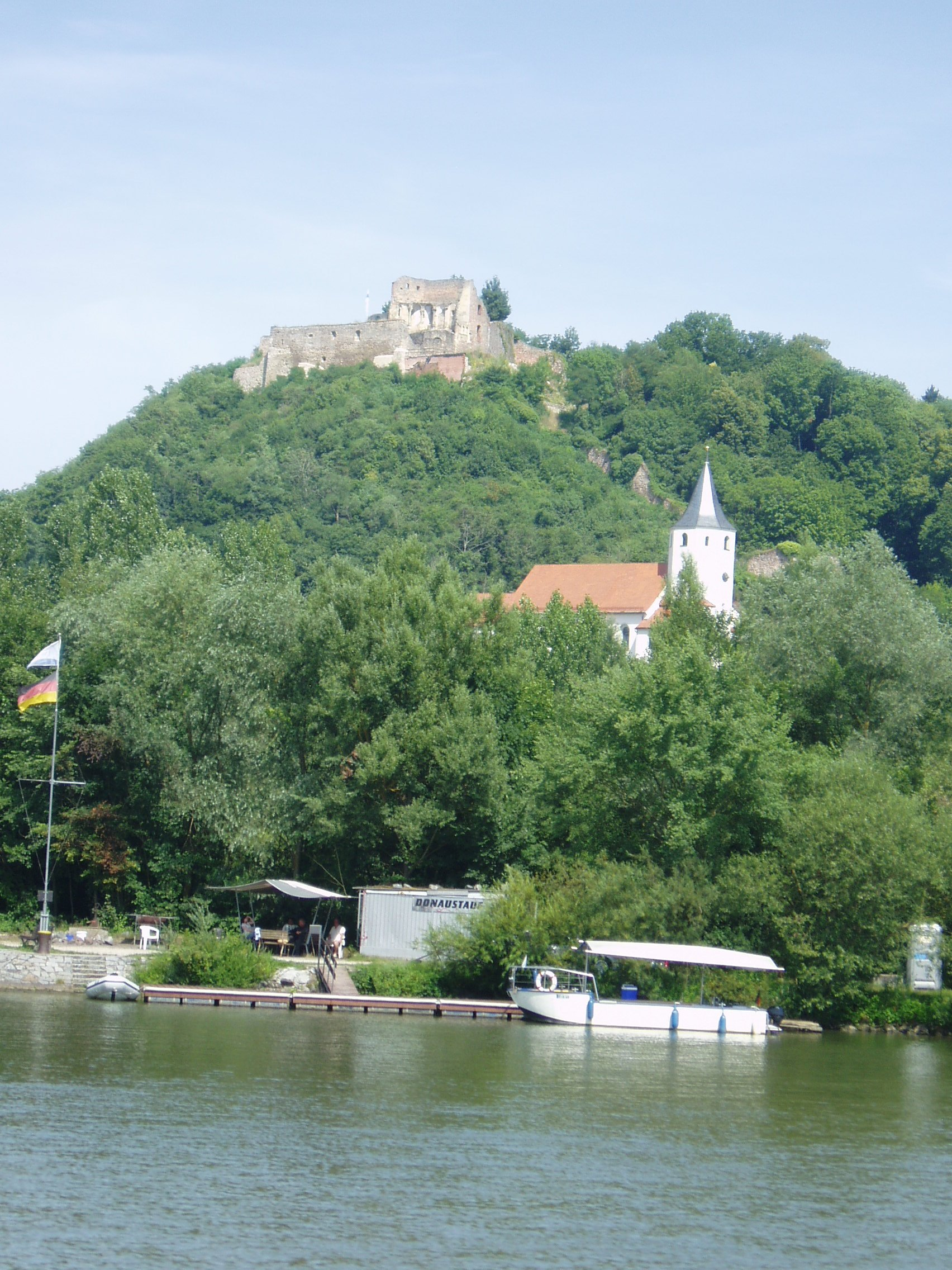
- View of the castle hill from Donaustauf to the south

Site information
- Type: hill castle
- Code: DE-BY
- Condition: Ringmauer, Torbauten, Bergfried

Location
- Coordinates: 49°01′51″N 12°12′26″E
- Height: 424 m above sea level (NN)

Site history
- Built: c. 914-930

Donaustauf Castle (German: Burgruine Donaustauf) is a ruined hill castle located at a height of 424 m above sea level (NN) on a hill spur overlooking the River Danube by the market village of Donaustauf in the Upper Palatine county of Regensburg in the south German state of Bavaria. Donaustauf grew up during the Middle Ages under the protection of the mighty fortifications of the castle.

Since 6 April 1986 the castle ruins have belonged to Donaustauf and, from 1997, the municipality had the castle made safe and renovated it.

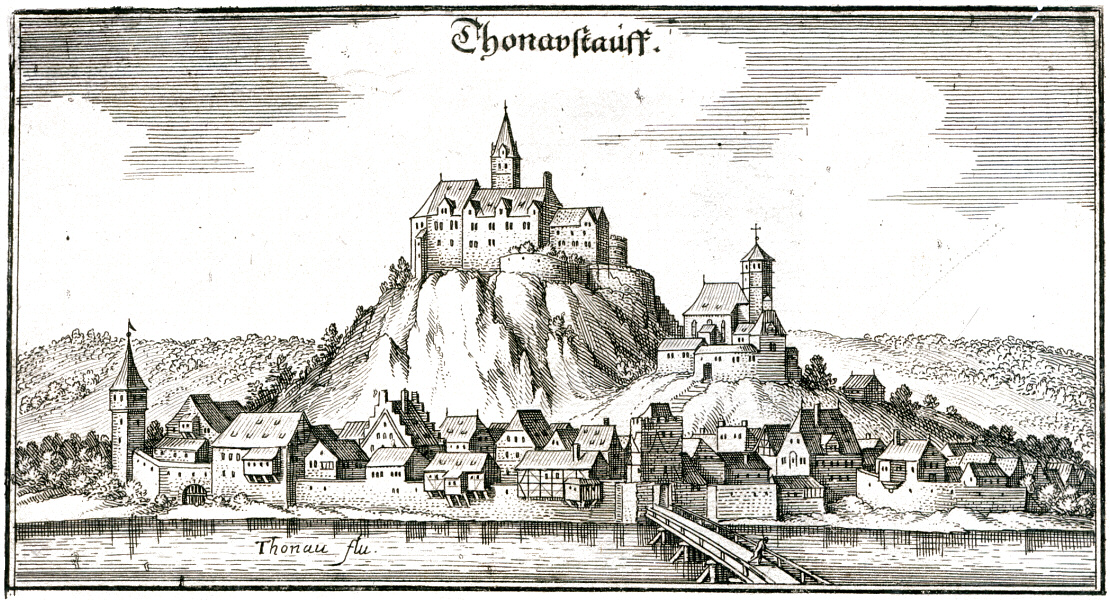
The castle by Merian (1644 copperplate)

== History ==
The castle is built on the site of a Celtic fort of unknown size and importance dating to around 500 BC. Based on excavations in 1981 of the northeast side of the lower outer bailey it appears to date to the late Hallstatt period.

Between 914 and 930 AD, Bishop Tuto of Regensburg had a castle built here to defend the area from Hungarian invasion. The castle was recorded as castellum quod dicitur Stufo between 894 and 930. The name stouf is Old High German for a cone-shaped rock or hilltop.

== Donaustauf Castle Trail ==
Donaustauf Castle is one of over 40 castles in the Regensburg Land that are linked by a network of footpaths, the so-called 'Castle Trails'. The Donaustauf Castle Trail (Donaustaufer Burgensteig) is about 30 kilometres long.

== Literature ==
- Silvia Codreanu-Windauer, Karl-Wilhelm Höllerer: Castellum Stufo - Untersuchungen auf dem Donaustaufer Burgberg. In: Das archäologische Jahr in Bayern, 2005. Konrad Theiss Verlag, 2006, pp. 113 ff
- Andreas Boos: Burgen im Süden der Oberpfalz – Die früh- und hochmittelalterlichen Befestigungen des Regensburger Umlandes. Universitätsverlag Regensburg, Regensburg, 1998, ISBN 3-930480-03-4, pp. 149–155.
- Georg Dehio: Bayern V: Regensburg und die Oberpfalz - Handbuch der deutschen Kunstdenkmäler. Drexler Jolanda / Hubel Achim (revised), Deutscher Kunstverlag, 1991.
- Udo Osterhaus: Der Burgberg bei Donaustauf, Landkreis Regensburg, Oberpfalz. Ein frühkeltischer Herrensitz. In: Das archäologische Jahr in Bayern, 1982. Konrad Theiss Verlag, 1983, pp. 76 ff
