= Neustadt an der Waldnaab (district) =

Coordinates: 49°40′N 12°00′E

- District
- Flag Coat of arms
- Country: Germany
- State: Bavaria
- Adm. region: Upper Palatinate
- Capital: Neustadt an der Waldnaab

Government
  - District admin.: Andreas Meier (CSU)

Area
  - Total: 1,430 km^{2} (550 sq mi)

Population (31 December 2025)
  - Total: 95,657
  - Density: 66.9/km^{2} (173/sq mi)
- Time zone: UTC+01:00 (CET)
  - Summer (DST): UTC+02:00 (CEST)
- Vehicle registration: NEW, ESB, VOH
- Website: www.neustadt.de

Neustadt an der Waldnaab is a Landkreis (district) in Bavaria, Germany. It is bounded by (from the south and clockwise) the districts of Schwandorf, Amberg-Sulzbach, Bayreuth and Tirschenreuth, and by the Czech Republic (Plzeň Region). The city of Weiden in der Oberpfalz is enclosed by, but does not belong to the district.

== History ==
The district was established in 1972 by merging the former districts of Neustadt an der Waldnaab, Eschenbach and Vohenstrauß.

== Geography ==
The district is located in the mountains of the Upper Palatine Forest (Oberpfälzer Wald). The two headstreams of the River Naab, the Waldnaab and Haidenaab, both run through the district to merge in the south of the area.

== Coat of arms ==
The coat of arms displays:

- the heraldic lion of the Palatinate
- three stars from the arms of the county of Störnstein
- blue and white bars from the arms of the county of Leuchtenberg

== Towns and municipalities ==
Clickable map of towns and municipalities in the district

Towns
1. Grafenwöhr
2. Neustadt an der Waldnaab
3. Vohenstrauß
4. Windischeschenbach
Märkte
1. Eslarn
2. Floß
3. Luhe-Wildenau
4. Mantel
5. Moosbach
6. Waidhaus
7. Waldthurn
Municipalities
1. Altenstadt an der Waldnaab
2. Flossenbürg

Verwaltungsgemeinschaften
1. Eschenbach in der Oberpfalz; 1. Eschenbach in der Oberpfalz^{1,2}; 2. Neustadt am Kulm^{2}; 3. Speinshart; 2. Kirchenthumbach; 1. Kirchenthumbach^{1,3}; 2. Schlammersdorf; 3. Vorbach	3. Neustadt an der Waldnaab; 1. Kirchendemenreuth; 2. Parkstein^{3}; 3. Püchersreuth; 4. Störnstein; 5. Theisseil	4. Pleystein; 1. Georgenberg; 2. Pleystein^{1,2}; 5. Pressath; 1. Pressath^{1,2}; 2. Schwarzenbach; 3. Trabitz	6. Schirmitz; 1. Bechtsrieth; 2. Irchenrieth; 3. Pirk; 4. Schirmitz^{1}	7. Tännesberg; 1. Leuchtenberg^{3}; 2. Tännesberg^{1,3}; 8. Weiherhammer; 1. Etzenricht; 2. Kohlberg^{3}; 3. Weiherhammer^{1}
^{1}seat of the Verwaltungsgemeinschaft; ^{2}town; ^{3}Markt
