= Waldthurn =

- Municipality
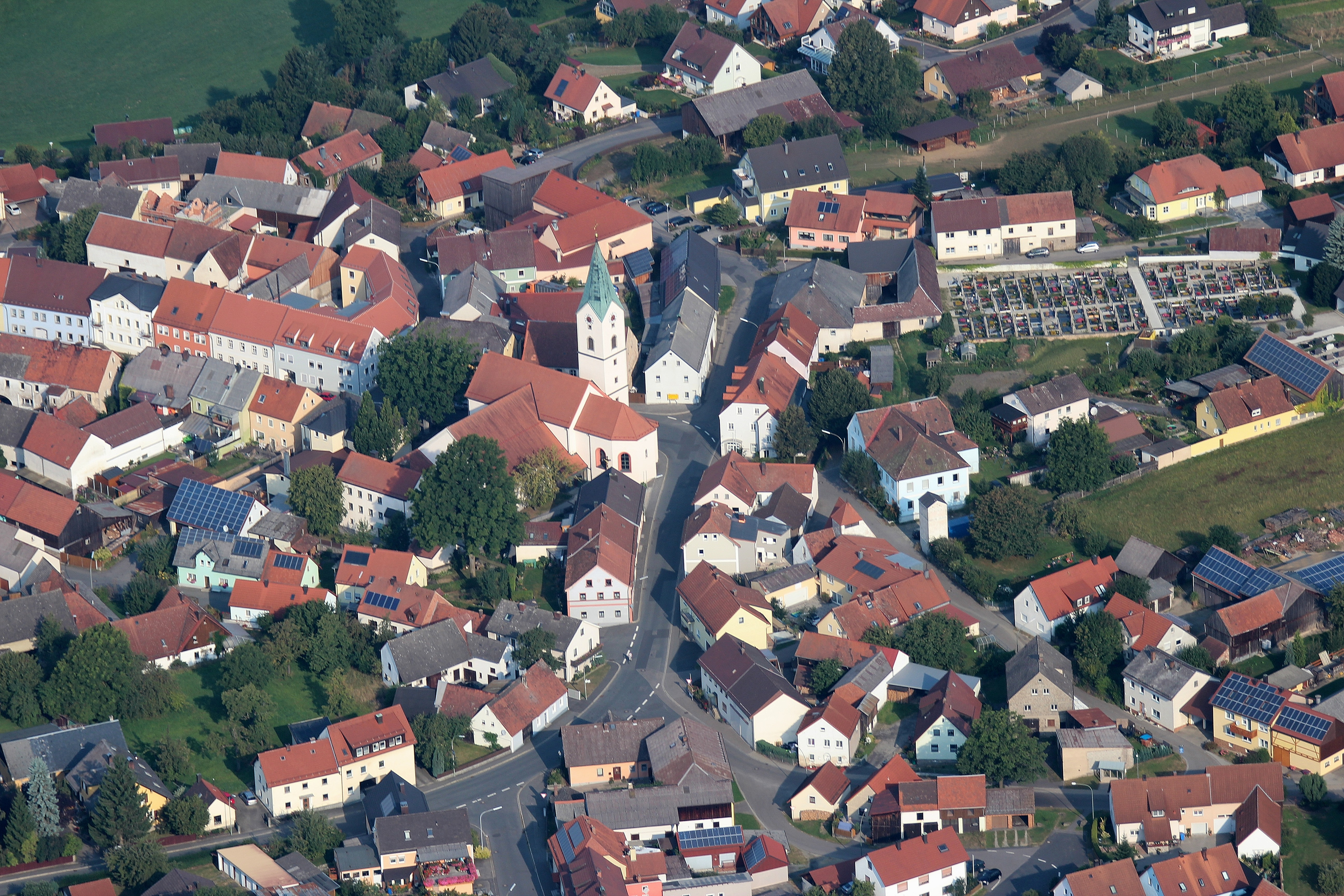
- Center of the town with the Church of Saint Sebastian

- Coat of arms

- Location of Waldthurn within Neustadt a.d.Waldnaab district
- Interactive map of Waldthurn
- Location within Germany Location within Bavaria
- Coordinates: 49°40′17″N 12°19′56″E
- Country: Germany
- State: Bavaria
- Admin. region: Oberpfalz
- District: Neustadt a.d.Waldnaab

Government
  - Mayor (2020–26): Josef Beimler (CSU)

Area
  - Total: 30.97 km^{2} (11.96 sq mi)
- Elevation: 556 m (1,824 ft)

Population (2025-12-31)
  - Total: 1,888
  - Density: 60.96/km^{2} (157.9/sq mi)
- Time zone: UTC+01:00 (CET)
  - Summer (DST): UTC+02:00 (CEST)
- Postal codes: 92727
- Dialling codes: 09657
- Vehicle registration: NEW
- Website: www.waldthurn.de

Waldthurn is a market town and municipality in the district of Neustadt an der Waldnaab in Bavaria, Germany.
