= Störnstein =

- Municipality
- Coat of arms

- Location of Störnstein within Neustadt a.d.Waldnaab district
- Interactive map of Störnstein
- Location within Germany Location within Bavaria
- Coordinates: 49°44′N 12°13′E
- Country: Germany
- State: Bavaria
- Admin. region: Oberpfalz
- District: Neustadt a.d.Waldnaab
- Municipal assoc.: Neustadt an der Waldnaab

Government
  - Mayor (2020–26): Markus Ludwig (SPD)

Area
  - Total: 10.92 km^{2} (4.22 sq mi)
- Elevation: 449 m (1,473 ft)

Population (2025-12-31)
  - Total: 1,558
  - Density: 142.7/km^{2} (369.5/sq mi)
- Time zone: UTC+01:00 (CET)
  - Summer (DST): UTC+02:00 (CEST)
- Postal codes: 92721
- Dialling codes: 09602
- Vehicle registration: NEW

Störnstein is a municipality in the district of Neustadt an der Waldnaab in Bavaria, Germany.

Störnstein was also the name of a former Princely County (of Lobkowicz family) in the Holy Roman Empire in the Bavarian Circle until the German mediatisation.

== Mayors ==
The mayor is Markus Ludwig (SPD), re-elected in 2020. In 2014 he became the successor of Boris-Michael Damzog (SPD).
