= Dürrschweinnaab =

River in Germany

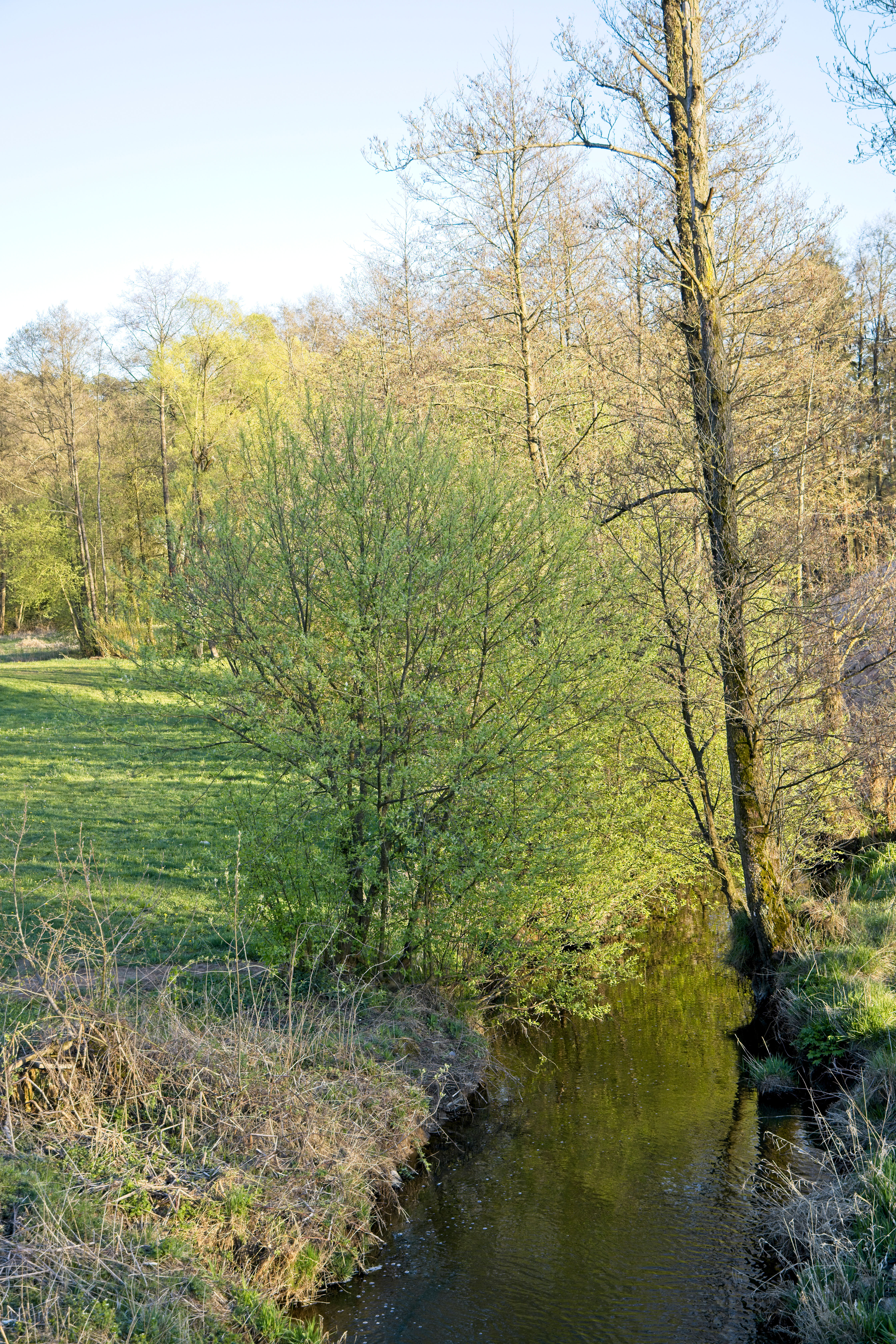
- The Dürrschweinnaab at Buch, part of Altenstadt an der Waldnaab

Location
- Country: Germany
- State: Bavaria

Physical characteristics
- Mouth
  - location: Sauerbach near Altenstadt an der Waldnaab
  - coordinates: 49.7193°N 12.1468°E
  - elevation: 408 m (1,339 ft)
- Length: 5 km (3.1 mi)

Basin features
- Progression: Sauerbach→ Schweinnaab→ Waldnaab→ Naab→ Danube→ Black Sea

The Dürrschweinnaab is a river of Bavaria, Germany. It is a right tributary of the Sauerbach river (Naab basin) in Upper Palatinate. It arises at Großenbühl (448 m) from the confluence of the Lohbach and the Schwarzenmoosbach, northeast of Parkstein.

== See also ==
- List of rivers of Bavaria
