= Upper Palatine Forest =

Mountain range in Central Europe

Coordinates: 49°23′00″N 12°47′01″E

Upper Palatinate Forest
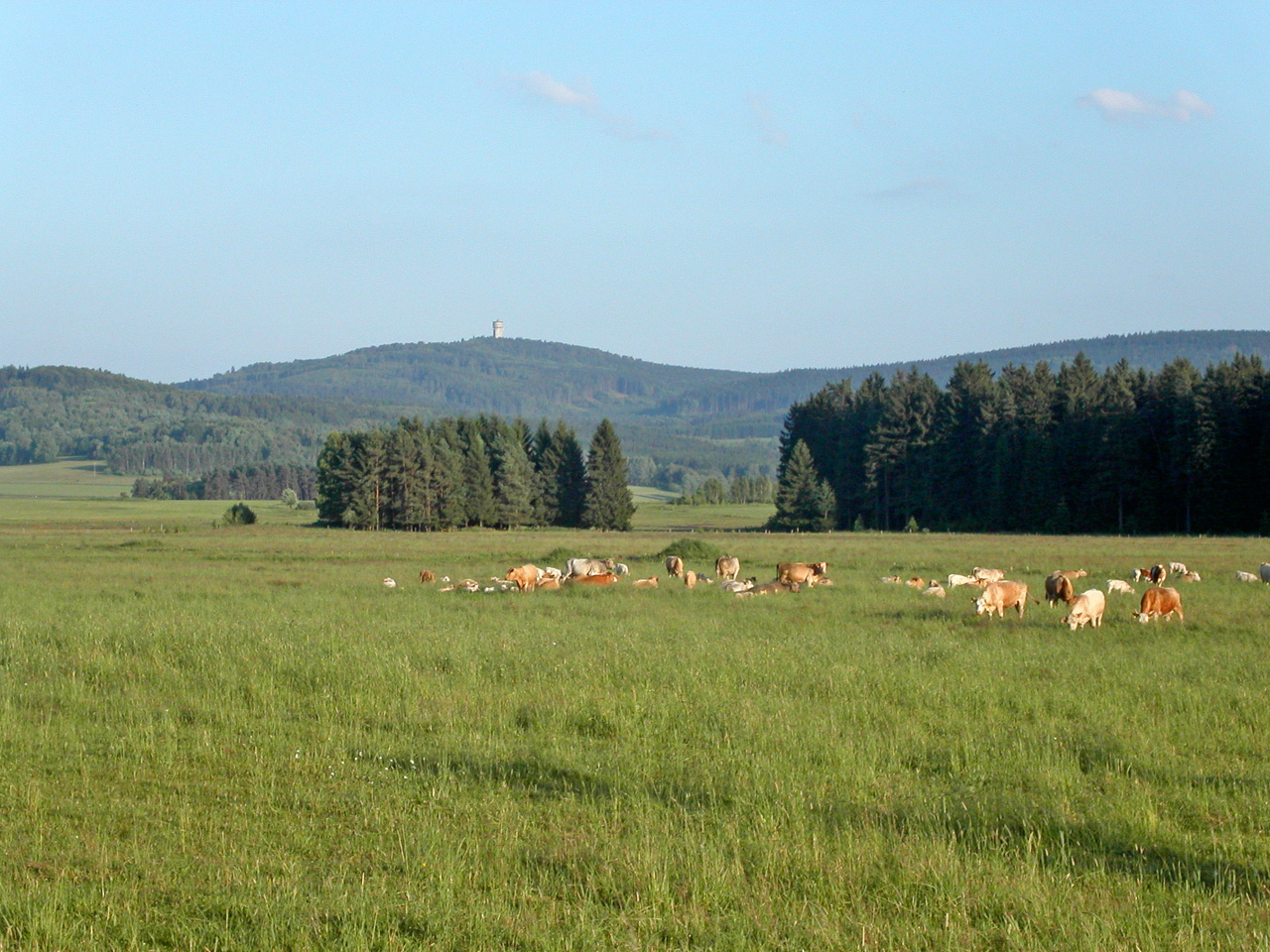
- View to Mt. Velký Zvon

Highest point
- Peak: Čerchov
- Elevation: 1,042 m (3,419 ft)

Geography
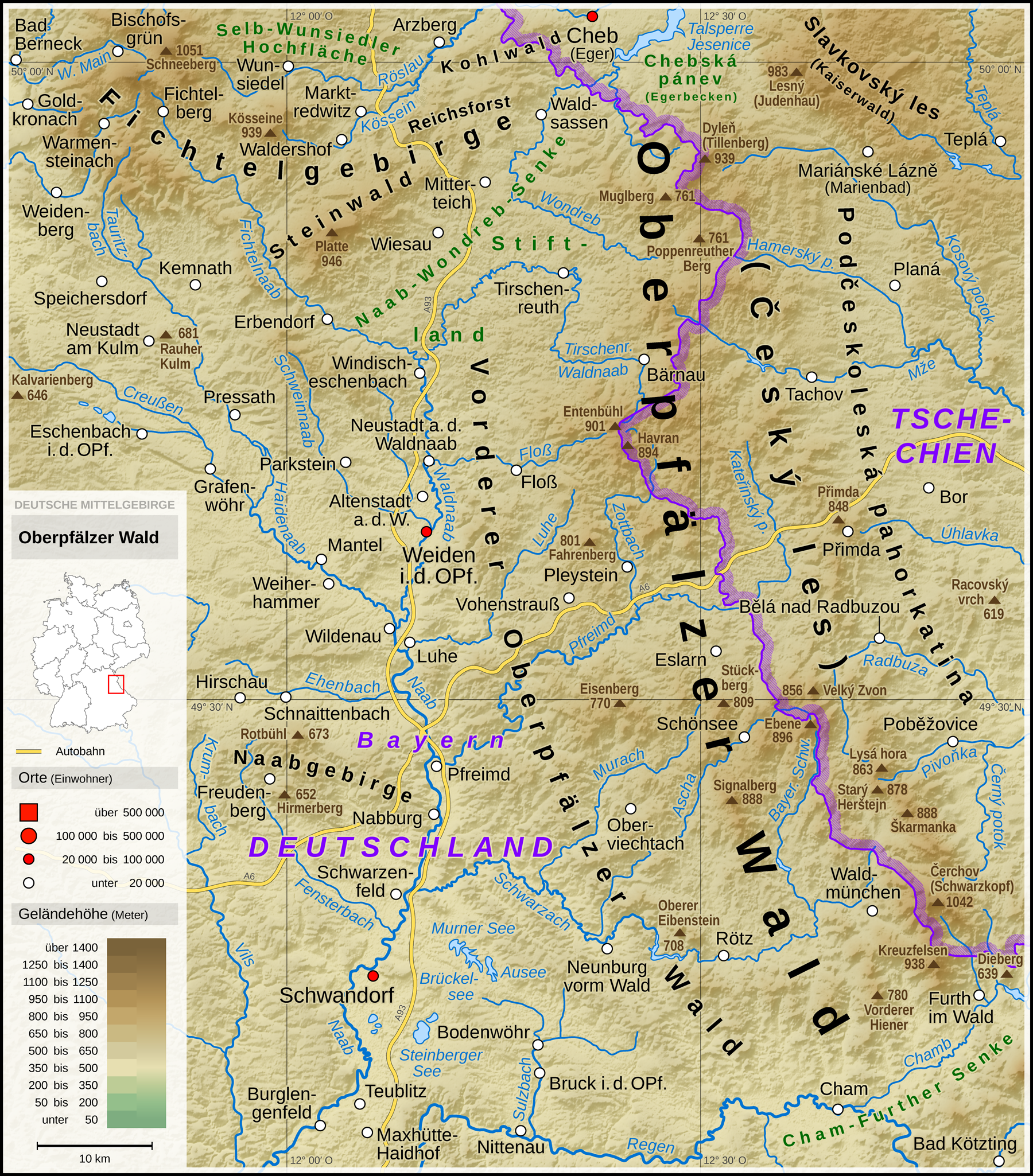
- Countries: Czech Republic and Germany
- Provinces: Bavaria and Plzeň Region
- Parent range: Central Uplands; Bohemian Massif

Geology
- Orogeny: Variscan
- Rock type(s): Metamorphic Gneiss, Granite, and Serpentinite rocks

The Upper Palatine Forest (German: Oberpfälzer Wald [ˌoːbɐpfɛltsɐ ˈvalt] or Böhmischer Wald; Czech: Český les, lit. 'Bohemian Forest') is a mountain range in Central Europe that is divided between the Czech Republic and Germany. It is a part of the larger Bohemian Massif and the German Central Uplands.

== Geography ==
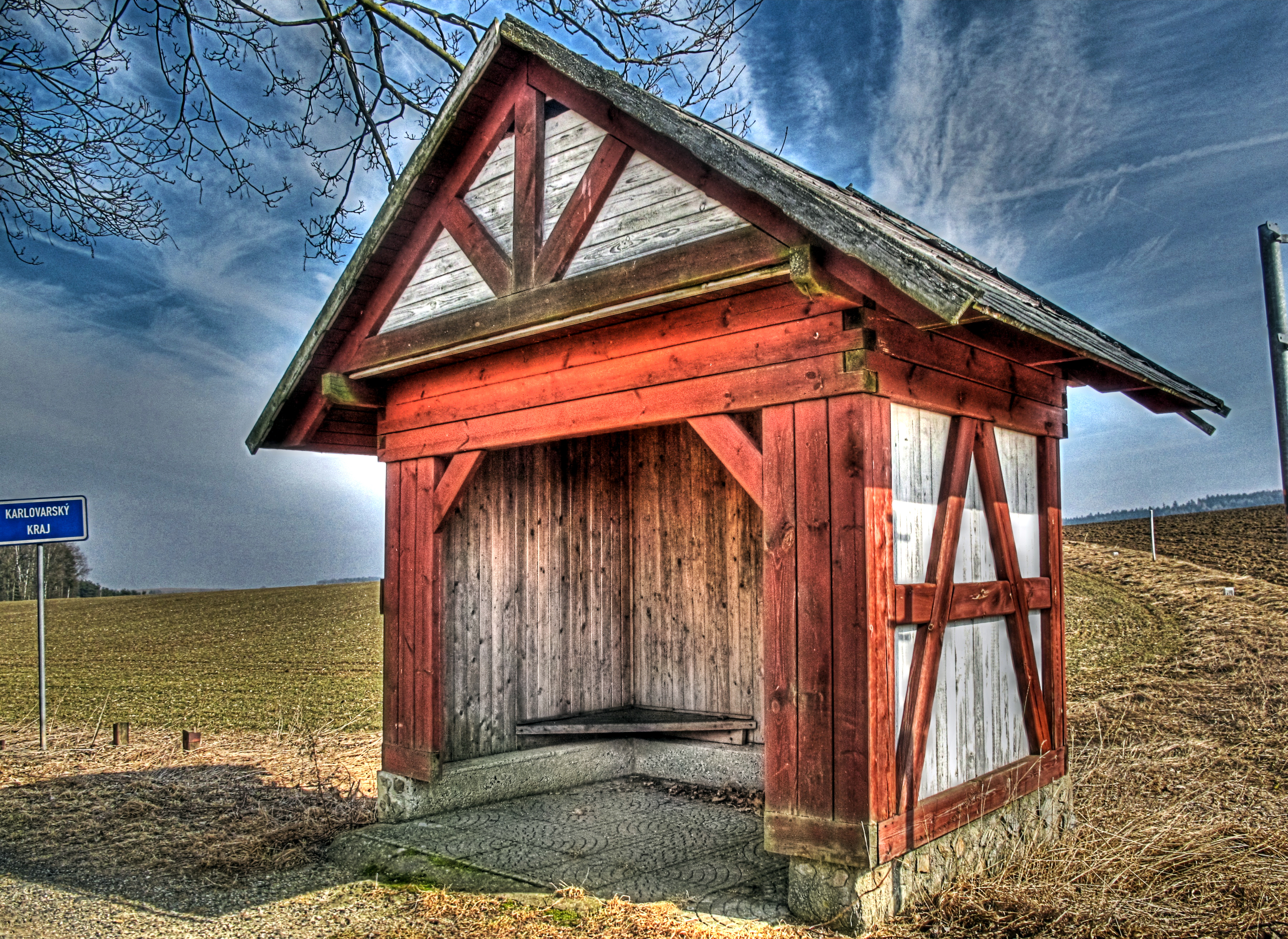
Hut on the German-Czech border near Bad Neualbenreuth

The German side belongs to the Upper Palatinate region of Bavaria, it stretches about 100 km (330,000 ft) from the Bavarian Forest in the south up to the Fichtel Mountains and the Steinwald range in the north. However, the highest peaks of the range lie along the eastern Czech side in the Plzeň Region of western Bohemia, northwest of the Bohemian Forest. The southern rim runs from the Cham and Furth Basin across the border to the Všeruby (Neumark) mountain pass, which is part of the Main European Watershed. The other end is marked by Waldsassen, the northernmost town of the Upper Palatinate.

The Mittelgebirge range is a mountainous solid mass, its highest point Čerchov being at an altitude of 1,042 m (3,419 ft). Prominent rocks include the Wolfenstein and the Parkstein hill. Once a mining area for iron and gold, the uplands feature many steep valleys, medieval castle ruins and numerous hiking trails. It is a popular destination for recreation.

Rivers rising in the Upper Palatinate Forest include

- Wondreb (Odrava), a tributary of the Ohře, with Muglbach waterfall
- the Waldnaab headstream of the Naab and its Pfreimd and Schwarzach tributaries
- the Mže – headstream of the Berounka – and its Hamerský potok (Hammerbach) tributary.

== Highest peaks ==
German name	Czech name	Height (m)	Height (ft)	State/Region	Country
Schwarzkopf	Čerchov	1,042	3,419	Plzeň	Czech Republic
	Skalka	1,005	3,297	Plzeň	Czech Republic
Langenfels	Dlouhá skála	969	3,179	Plzeň	Czech Republic
Tillenberg	Dyleň	939	3,081	Karlovy Vary	Czech Republic
Fichtenfels	Smrčí	935	3,068	Plzeň	Czech Republic
Entenbühl		901	2,956	Bavaria	Germany
Weingartenfels		896	2,940	Bavaria	Germany
Großer Rabenberg	Havran	894	2,933	Plzeň	Czech Republic
Signalberg		888	2,913	Bavaria	Germany
Reichenstein		874	2,867	Bavaria	Germany
Plattenberg	Velký Zvon	856	2,808	Plzeň	Czech Republic
Frauenstein		835	2,740	Bavaria	Germany
Schellenberg		829	2,720	Bavaria	Germany
Stückstein		808	2,651	Bavaria	Germany
Steinberg		802	2,631	Bavaria	Germany
Fahrenberg		801	2,628	Bavaria	Germany
Schwarzwihrberg / Schloßberg		706	2,316	Bavaria	Germany
Johannisberg		605	1,985	Bavaria	Germany

== Towns and municipalities ==
=== Towns ===
- Amberg, DE
- Bärnau, DE
- Poběžovice, CZ
- Přimda, CZ
- Tachov, CZ
- Rötz, DE
- Schönsee, DE
- Schwandorf, DE
- Tirschenreuth, DE
- Vohenstrauß, DE
- Waldmünchen, DE
- Waldsassen, DE
- Weiden, DE

=== Municipalities ===
- Bad Neualbenreuth
- Bechtsrieth
- Eslarn
- Falkenberg
- Floß
- Flossenbürg
- Freudenberg
- Klenčí pod Čerchovem
- Leuchtenberg
- Mantel
- Moosbach
- Nabburg
- Neunburg vorm Wald
- Neusorg
- Niedermurach
- Pleystein
- Plößberg
- Oberviechtach
- Rozvadov
- Schirmitz
- Tännesberg
- Waidhaus
- Waldthurn
