= Kaltenmühlbach =

River in Germany

Location
- Country: Germany
- State: Bavaria

Physical characteristics
- Source
  - elevation: 814 m (2,671 ft)
- Mouth
  - location: Waldnaab
  - coordinates: 49°48′41″N 12°23′30″E
  - elevation: 545 m (1,788 ft)
- Length: 6.8 km (4.2 mi)

Basin features
- Progression: Waldnaab→ Naab→ Danube→ Black Sea

Kaltenmühlbach is a 6.8-kilometre-long (4.2 mi) left tributary of the Waldnaab in the Upper Palatinate in Bavaria, Germany. It rises in the High Thaner Forest and flows to the Waldnaab.

== Course ==
The Kaltenmühlbach springs at 815 m (2,674 ft) above sea level from the so-called Three Wells (Drei Brunnen) at the foot of Entenbühl (901 m (2,956 ft)) near the border of the Silberhütte. After only a few hundred meters, it becomes a little stream in the hamlet Altglashütte. After 3 km (1.9 mi) it flows into a pond.

From the bifurcation of left flowing Silberbach, it divides again after a few kilometers, and some of the water flows back to the Kaltenmühlbach. The Silberbach flows directly into the Waldnaab.

After the Kaltenmühlbach has regenerated after its turn, it flows through a deep valley, where it grows by numerous creeks into a small river. After a few farms, it flows under the road 2172 (Plößberg - Bärnau), and then helps the fledgling Waldnaab flow.

== Inflows ==
- Urtlbach

== See also ==
- List of rivers of Bavaria
