= Waldnaab (disambiguation) =

Waldnaab is a river in the Upper Palatinate in Bavaria, Germany.

Waldnaab may also refer to:

- Altenstadt an der Waldnaab, a municipality in the district Neustadt an der Waldnaab in Bavaria, Germany
- Neustadt an der Waldnaab, a municipality in Bavaria, Germany, and capital of the eponymous district
- Neustadt an der Waldnaab (district), a district in Bavaria, Germany
