= Girnitz =

River in Germany

Location
- Country: Germany
- State: Bavaria

Physical characteristics
- Mouth
  - location: Floß
  - coordinates: 49.7286°N 12.2031°E
- Length: 10.3 km (6.4 mi)

Basin features
- Progression: Floß→ Waldnaab→ Naab→ Danube→ Black Sea

Girnitz is a river of Bavaria, Germany. It flows into the Floß in Störnstein.

== See also ==
- List of rivers of Bavaria
