= Sauerbach (Schweinnaab) =

River in Bavaria, Germany

- The Sauerbach near Altenstadt an der Waldnaab

Location
- Country: Germany
- State: Bavaria

Physical characteristics
- Mouth
  - location: Schweinnaab
  - coordinates: 49.6912°N 12.1512°E
- Length: 19.9 km (12.4 mi)

Basin features
- Progression: Schweinnaab→ Waldnaab→ Naab→ Danube→ Black Sea

The Sauerbach is a river of Bavaria, Germany. It is a left tributary of the Schweinnaab near Weiden in der Oberpfalz.

== See also ==
- List of rivers of Bavaria
