= Luhe (Naab) =

River in Bavaria, Germany

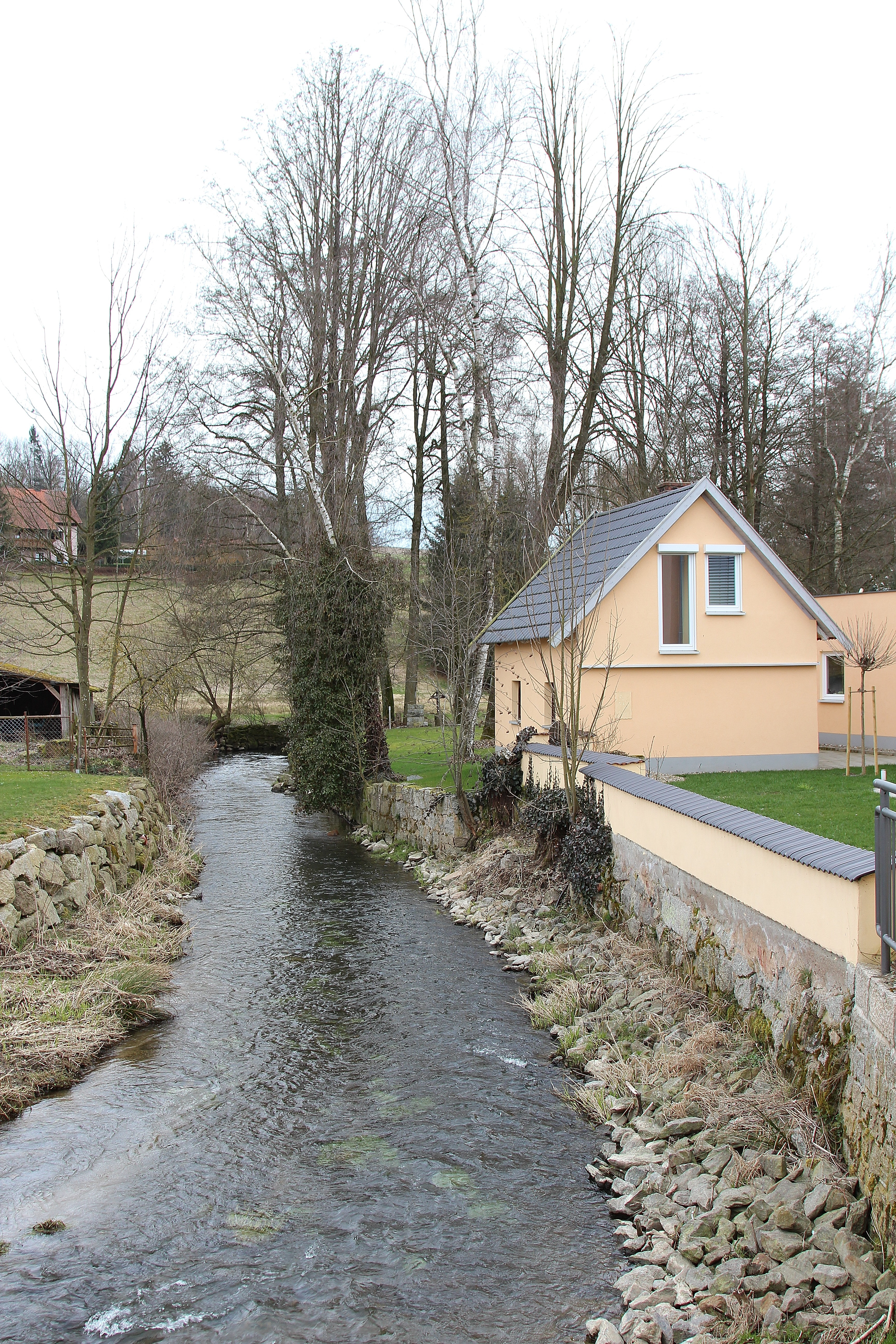
- The Luhe in Kaimling, a district of Vohenstrauß

Location
- Country: Germany
- State: Bavaria
- District: Upper Palatinate
- Reference no.: DE: 1432

Physical characteristics
- Source
  - location: east of Waldthurn-Wampenhof
  - coordinates: 49°42′20″N 12°21′00″E
  - elevation: ca. 630 m
- Mouth: Naab
  - location: near Luhe-Markt
  - coordinates: 49°34′54″N 12°08′38″E
  - elevation: 378 m
- Length: 31.6 km (19.6 mi)
- Basin size: 154 km^{2} (59 sq mi)

Basin features
- Progression: Naab→ Danube→ Black Sea

The Luhe (German pronunciation: [ˈluːə]) is a roughly 26-kilometre-long (16 mi) left headstream of the River Naab in the Upper Palatine Forest in Bavaria, southern Germany.

It rises near the hamlet of Wampenhof near Waldthurn, flows through Waldthurn, Roggenstein, Kaimling, past Michldorf and Leuchtenberg and through Lückenrieth and Luhe-Markt. There it discharges into the Naab.

Due to the river's very steep descent, many watermills and hammer forges have been built along its course. Its catchment area is used almost entirely for agricultural purposes with the result that the water of the Luhe is of good quality, enabling many species of fish, crustaceans and mussels to thrive there.

Its most important tributaries are the Trausenbach, the Lerau and the Gleitsbach.

== See also ==
- List of rivers of Bavaria
