= Fichtelnaab =

River in Germany

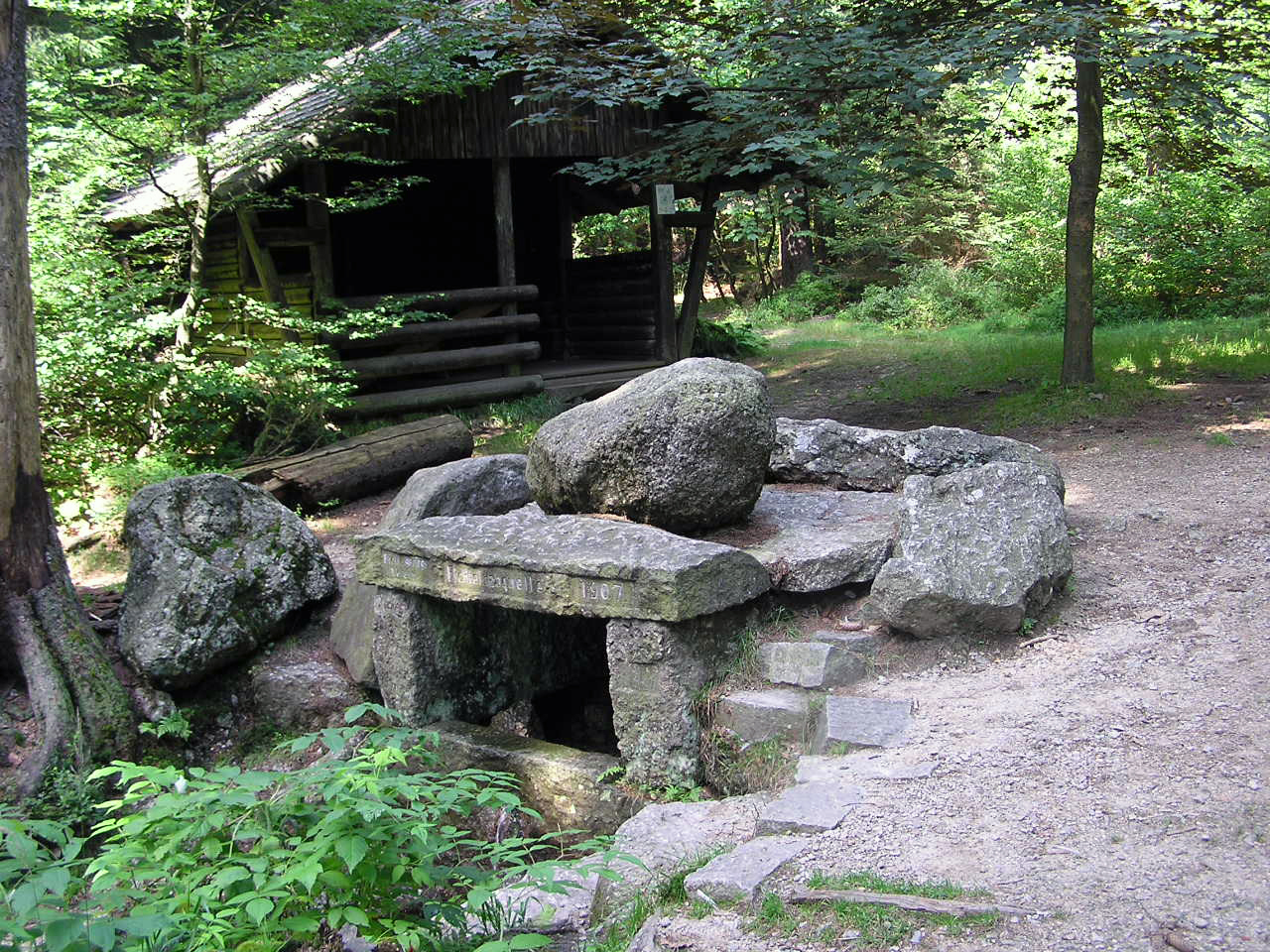
- Source of the Fichtelnaab

Location
- Country: Germany
- State: Bavaria
- Districts: Bayreuth and Tirschenreuth
- Reference no.: DE: 1412

Physical characteristics
- Source
  - location: on the southeastern slopes of the Ochsenkopf
  - coordinates: 50°01′31″N 11°50′01″E
  - elevation: ca. 865 m
- Mouth
  - location: near Windischeschenbach into the Waldnaab
  - coordinates: 49°48′30″N 12°09′44″E
  - elevation: 423 m
- Length: 47.4 km (29.5 mi)
- Basin size: 278 km^{2} (107 sq mi)

Basin features
- Progression: Waldnaab→ Naab→ Danube→ Black Sea
- Tributaries
  - left: Gregnitz

The Fichtelnaab is a river, 47.5 kilometres long, in Upper Franconia and the Upper Palatinate, Bavaria, Germany. It rises in the Fichtel Mountains and flows into the Waldnaab near Windischeschenbach.

== Course ==
The source of the Fichtelnaab is located on the southeastern slope of the Ochsenkopf (1,024 m above sea level (NN)) northwest of Fichtelberg and west of the retention pond Fichtelsee (10.5 hectares and 752 m above NN). From there it flows southeast through the villages of Fichtelberg and Mehlmeisel in the district of Tirschenreuth. From there the Fichtelnaab passes through Brand, Ebnath, Neusorg and Erbendorf to Windischeschenbach, where it joins the Waldnaab.

== Tributaries ==
- Moosbach (right)
- Kratzebach (left)
- Fallbach (right)
- Geisbach (right)
- Fuhrbach (left)
- Saugrabenbach (right)
- Gregnitz (left)
- Goldbach (right)
- Witzelbach (right)
- Höllbach (left)
- Felberger Bach (right)
- Forellenbach (left)
- Tiefenbach (right)
- Galgenbach (right)
- Steinbach (right)
- Heinbach (left)

== Sources ==
- Die Naab – mit Waldnaab, Fichtelnaab, Haidenaab. 144 pages, Pustet, Regensburg, ISBN 3-7917-1915-7.
