= Luhe =

Luhe or Lühe may refer to:

== People ==
- Gideon von der Lühe (1704–1755), Danish court official
- Margrethe von der Lühe (1741–1826), Danish courtier; Chief Court Mistress to the Danish queen and the queen dowager
- Volrad August von der Lühe (1705–1778), Danish court official
- Zhu Lühe (1877–1945), politician and judicial officer in the Republic of China

== China ==
- Luhe County (陆河县), Shanwei, Guangdong
- Luhe District (六合区), Nanjing, Jiangsu
- Luhe, Heilongjiang (芦河镇), town in Qinggang County
- Luhe, Puyang County (鲁河镇), town in Henan
- Luhe Township, Gansu (卢河乡), in Xihe County
- Luhe Township, Heilongjiang (鲁河乡), in Longjiang County
- Luhe Township, Jiangsu (鲁河乡), in Guanyun County
- Luhe Township, Shangqiu (路河乡), in Suiyang District, Shangqiu, Henan
- Lühe Township (吕河乡), Zhengyang County, Henan

== Germany ==
- Luhe (Ilmenau), a river that runs through the Lüneburg Heath in northern Germany
- Luhe (Naab), a river that runs through the Upper Palatine Forest in Bavaria
- Lühe, a Samtgemeinde ("collective municipality") west of Hamburg
- Lühe (river), a river that runs through Altes Land and debouches in the Elbe
- Luhe-Wildenau, a municipality in the district of Neustadt, Bavaria
