= Gregnitz =

River in Germany

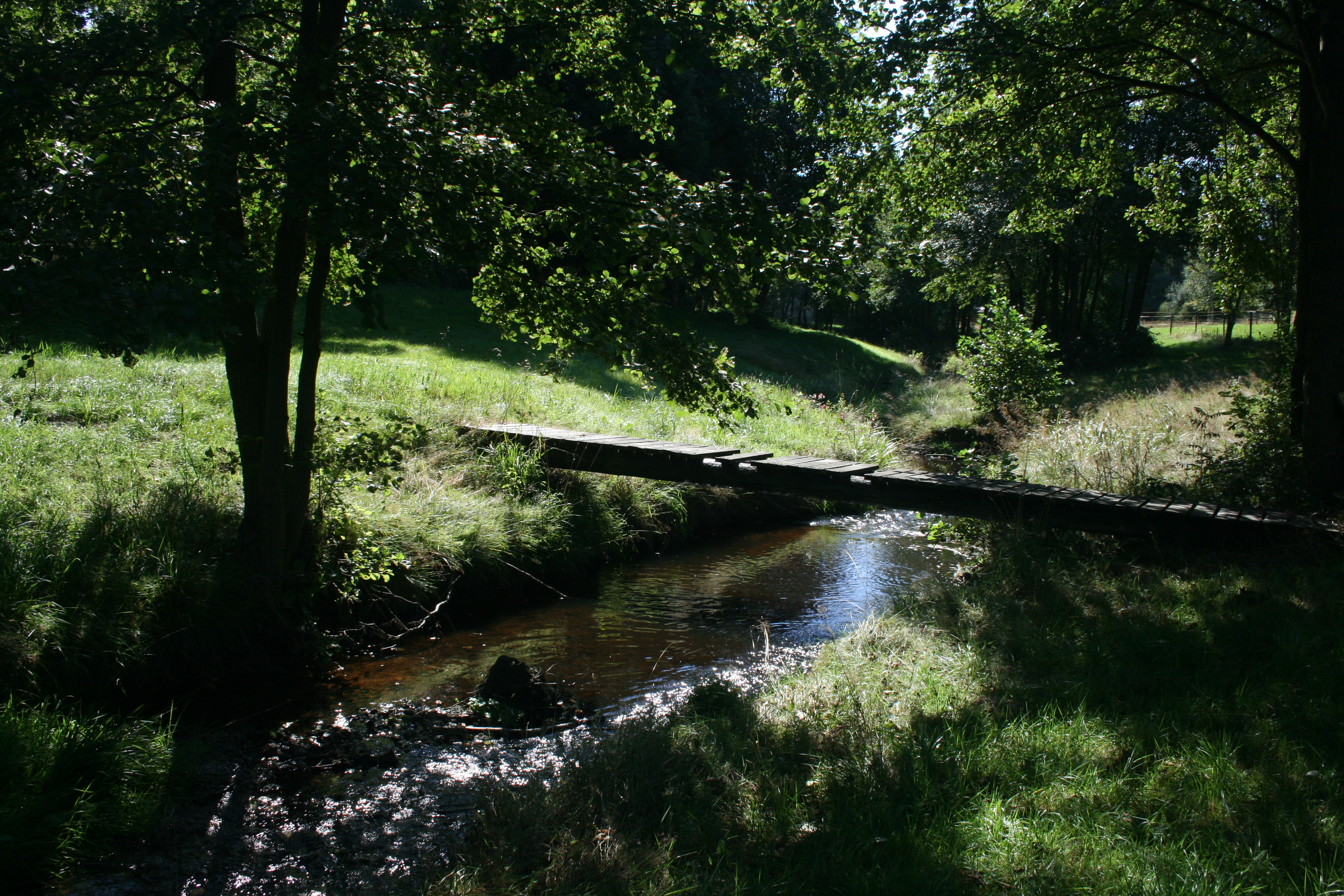
- The Gregnitz at Nagel

Location
- Country: Germany
- State: Bavaria

Physical characteristics
- Mouth
  - location: Fichtelnaab
  - coordinates: 49.9553°N 11.9331°E
- Length: 11.1 km (6.9 mi)

Basin features
- Progression: Fichtelnaab→ Waldnaab→ Naab→ Danube→ Black Sea

Gregnitz is a river of Bavaria, Germany. It flows into the Fichtelnaab near Ebnath.

== See also ==
- List of rivers of Bavaria
