= Haidenaab =

River in Germany

- The Haidenaab at Steinfels (a parish of Mantel)

Location
- Country: Germany
- State: Bavaria
- Reference no.: DE: 142

Physical characteristics
- Source
  - location: northeast of Kirchenpingarten
  - coordinates: 49°56′15″N 11°48′06″E
  - elevation: ca. 680 m
- Mouth
  - location: confluence with the Waldnaab to become the Naab near Unterwildenau (mun. Luhe-Wildenau)
  - coordinates: 49°36′11″N 12°07′57″E
  - elevation: ca. 380 m
- Length: 69.1 km (42.9 mi)
- Basin size: 724 km^{2} (280 sq mi)

Basin features
- Progression: Naab→ Danube→ Black Sea

The Haidenaab (German pronunciation: [ˈhaɪdənaːp]) is the right and western headstream of the River Naab in the Upper Palatinate in the south German state of Bavaria. At its confluence with the Waldnaab near Luhe-Wildenau, the Naab is formed.

== Course ==
The river rises in the district of Bayreuth on the southern edge of the Fichtel Mountains between Kirchenpingarten and the mountain of Platte (830 m above NN), about seven kilometres north of Speichersdorf.

From there the Haidenaab heads in a southeasterly direction before reaching the district of Tirschenreuth by the Renaissance castle of Schlackenhof, where it is joined from the northwest by the Flernitzbach. Running past Kaibitz Castle it enters the district of Neustadt an der Waldnaab after a short distance. Near Dorfgmünd it is joined by its largest tributary, the River Creußen. The Haidenaab continues past Pressath and Mantel to Luhe-Wildenau, where it is united at the village of Unterwildenau with the Waldnaab to become the Naab, which eventually flows into the Danube. For much of its course the Haidenaab is accompanied by the Haidenaab Cycleway. This runs through the villages of Kastl, Trabitz, Pressath, Schwarzenbach, Mantel, Weiherhammer, Etzenricht, Oberwildenau and Unterwildenau. As the Naab Cycleway the path continues to the city of Regensburg.

== Tributaries ==
- Blumenbach (left)
- Kaltenbach (left)
- Goldbach (right)
- Weiherlohe (left)
- Tauritzbach (right)
- Flernitzbach (right)
- Mooswiesengraben (left)
- Fallbach (left)
- Grünbach (left)
- Mühlbach (right)
- Brandgraben (left)
- Siechenbach (left)
- Pressather Bach (left)
- Schwarzenbach (left)
- Creußen (right)
- Hohlbach (left)
- Heilinglohbach (left)
- Röthenbach (right)
- Eichelbach (right)
- Mühllohbach (right)
- Stockweiherbach (right)

== Sources ==
- The Naab – mit Waldnaab, Fichtelnaab, Haidenaab, 144 pages, Pustet, Regensburg.(ISBN 3-7917-1915-7)
