= Floß (river) =

River in Germany

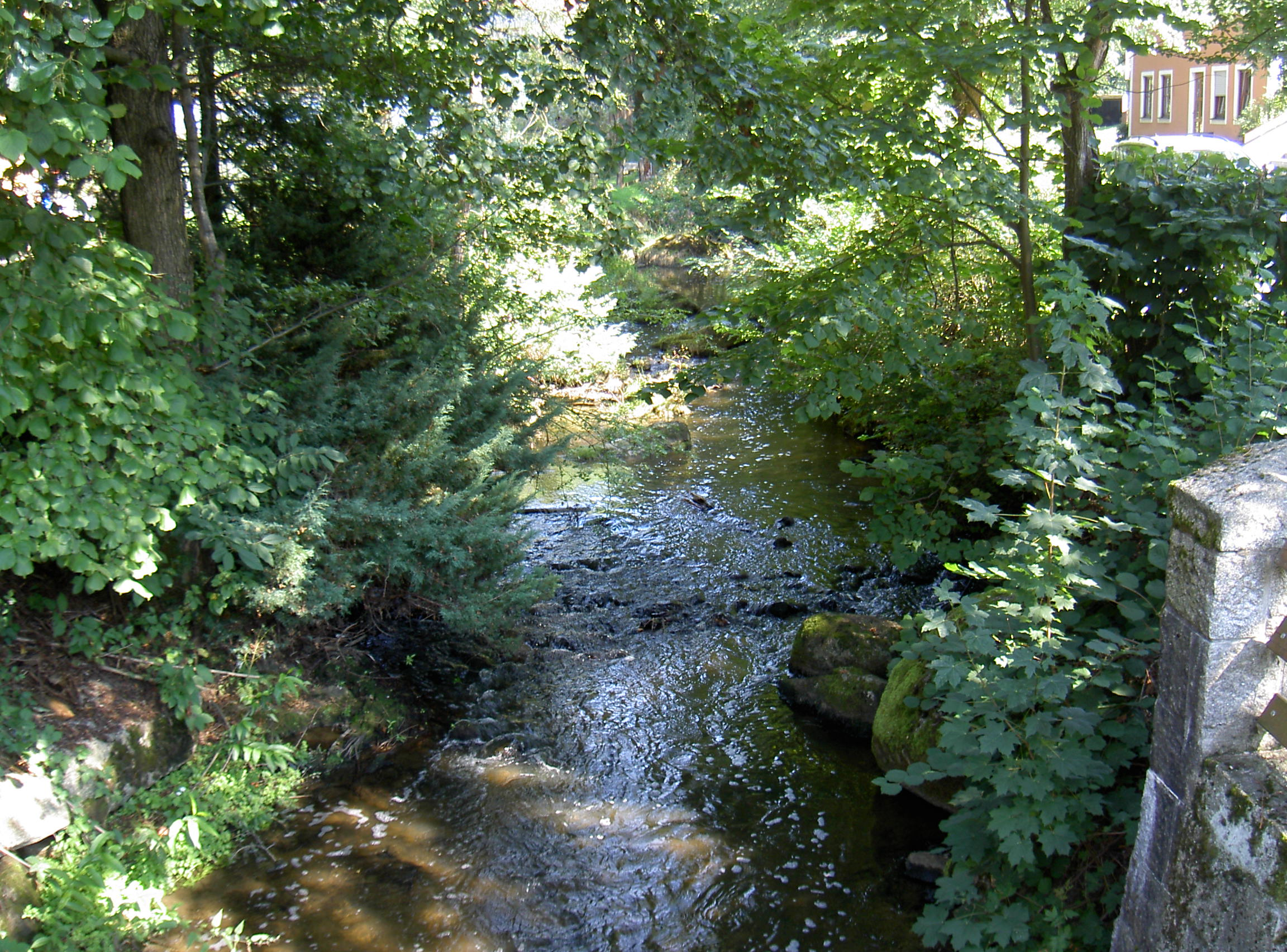
- The Floß in Störnstein

Location
- Country: Germany
- State: Bavaria

Physical characteristics
- Mouth
  - location: Waldnaab
  - coordinates: 49.7250°N 12.1665°E
- Length: 26.0 km (16.2 mi)

Basin features
- Progression: Waldnaab→ Naab→ Danube→ Black Sea

Floß (German pronunciation: [floːs]) is a river of Bavaria, Germany. It passes through the town Floß, and flows into the Waldnaab near Neustadt an der Waldnaab.

== See also ==
- List of rivers of Bavaria
