= Creußen (river) =

River in Germany

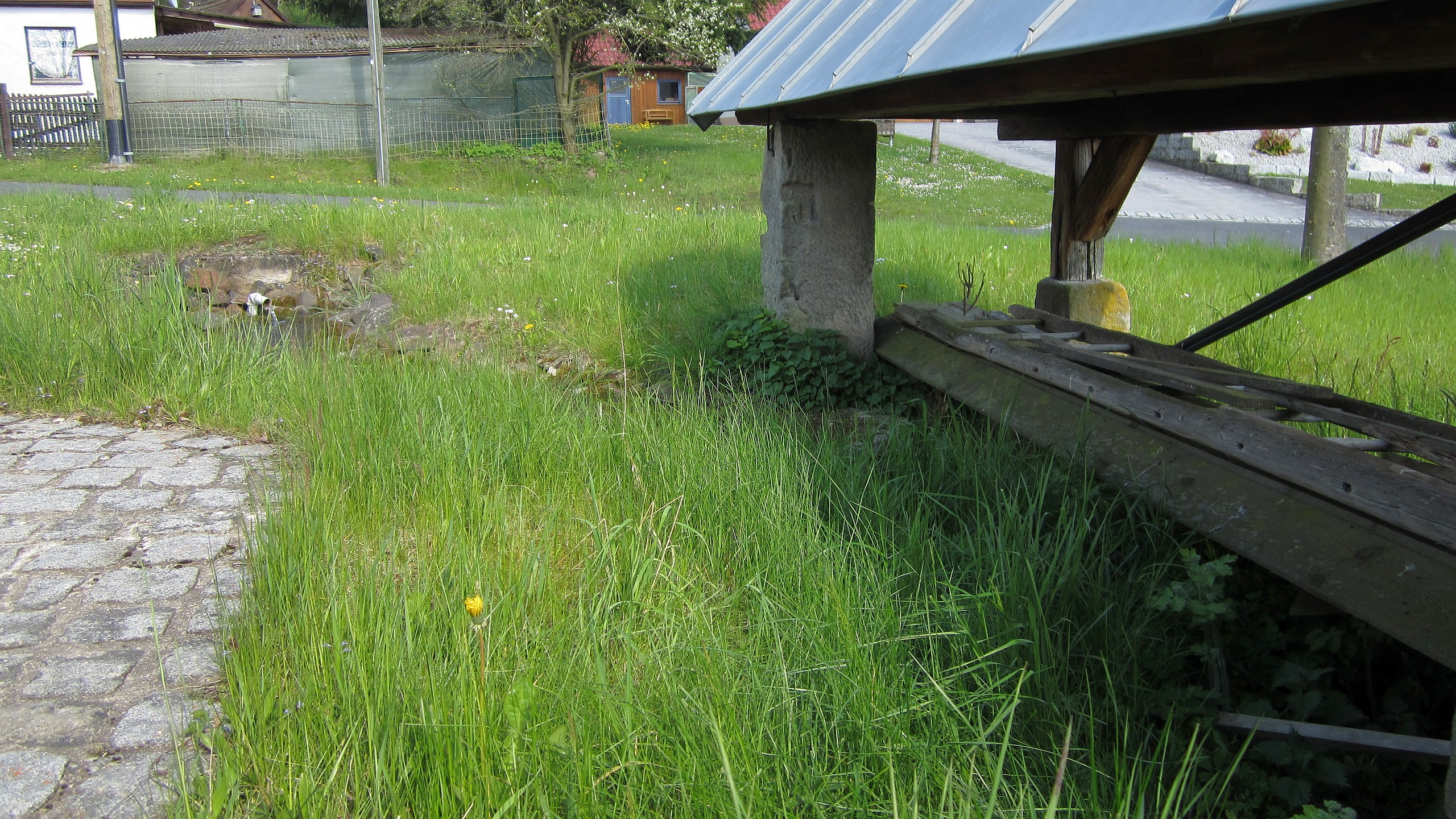
- Source in Altencreußen

Location
- Country: Germany
- State: Bavaria

Physical characteristics
- Mouth
  - location: Haidenaab
  - coordinates: 49.6960°N 11.9579°E
- Length: 34.6 km (21.5 mi)
- Basin size: 234 km^{2} (90 sq mi)

Basin features
- Progression: Haidenaab→ Naab→ Danube→ Black Sea

Creußen (German pronunciation: [ˈkʁɔʏsn̩]) is a river of Bavaria, Germany. It flows into the Haidenaab near Grafenwöhr.

== See also ==
- List of rivers of Bavaria
