= Hohlbach =

Hohlbach may refer to:

- Hohlbach (Nidda), a river of Hesse, Germany, tributary of the Nidda
- Hohlbach (Haidenaab), a river of Bavaria, Germany, tributary of the Haidenaab
- Hohlbach, a former subdivision of the municipality Hollenegg, Deutschlandsberg District, Styria, Austria
