= Zoigl =

Type of German beer

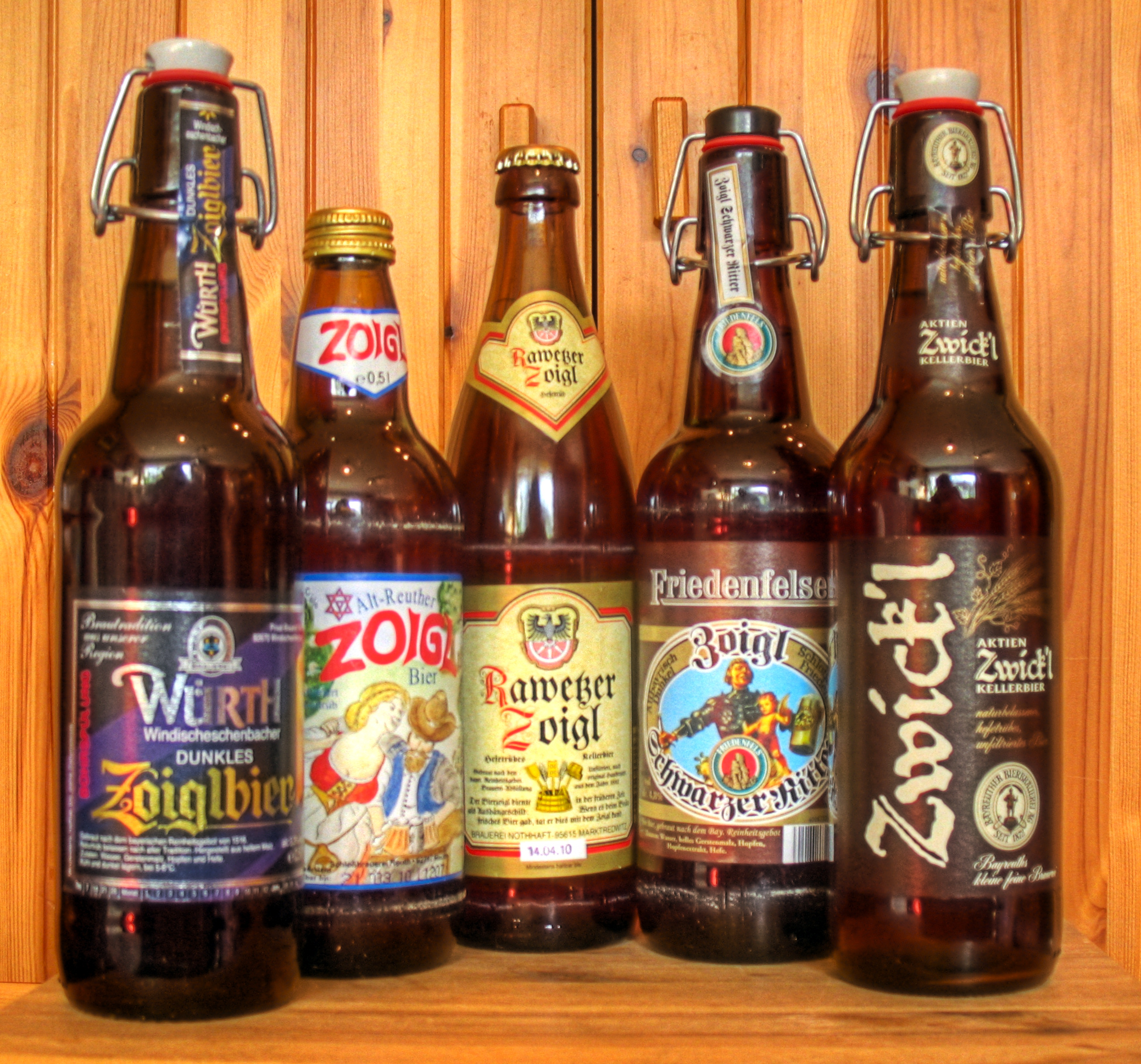
Zoigl beers

Zoigl is a type of German beer brewed in the Oberpfalz, eastern Bavaria, between Franconia and the Czech Republic.

The name is believed to be derived from a Windischeschenbacher dialect pronunciation of the German word zeigen or Zeichen meaning "sign", the symbol used to advertise that the beer is available at an establishment. Its logo is composed of two component triangles represent the joining of six beer ingredients: the first triangle denoting water, fire and air; the second and inverted triangle denoting malted barley, hops, water.

== History ==
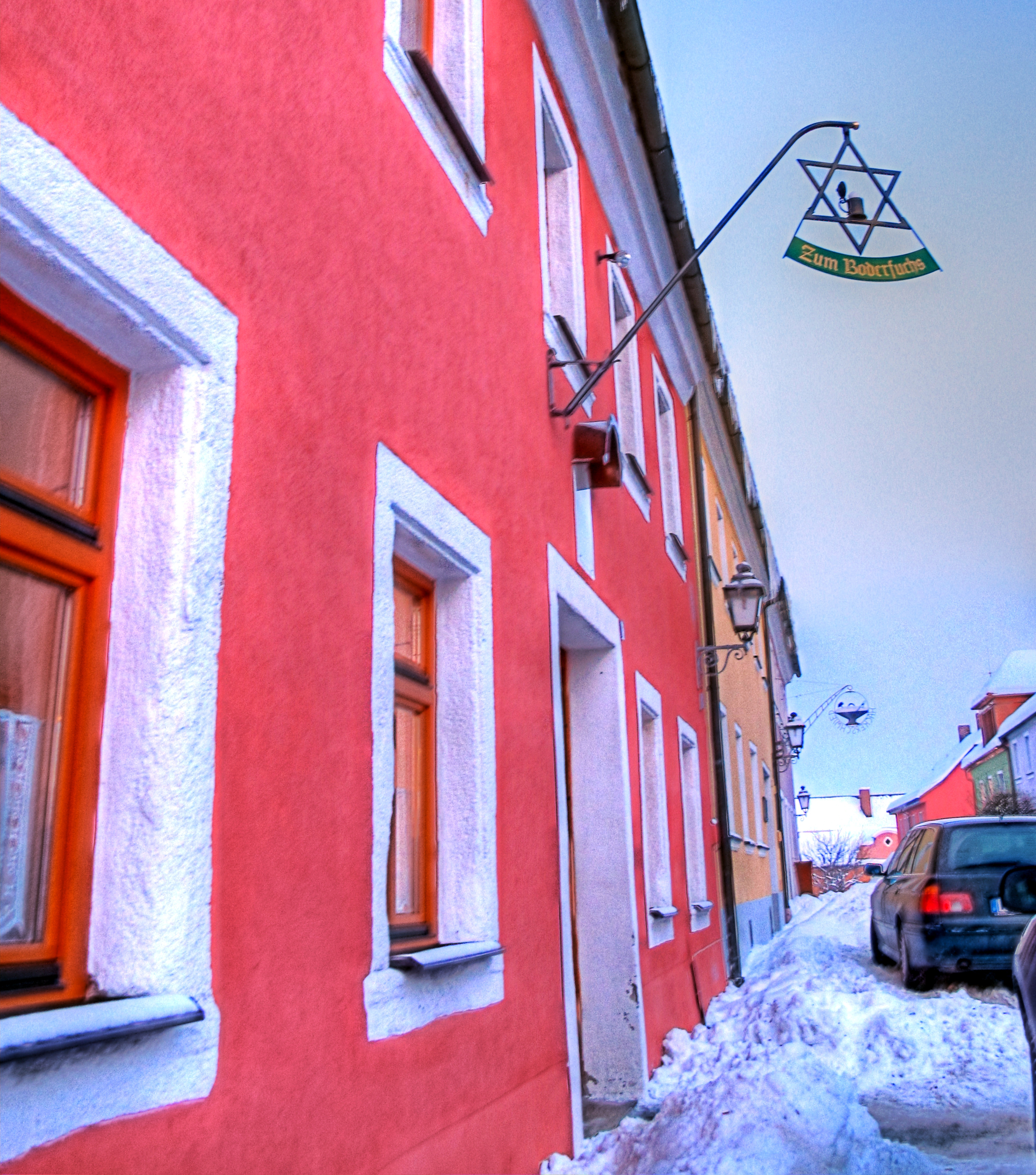
Zoigl house in Tirschenreuth, northeast of Bavaria

The first documented example of the word "zeigl" occurs in a 1508 document at Neustadt an der Waldnaab, having derived from the German "Zeichen" meaning sign, or "zeigen" meaning show. It was pronounced "zeigel" in the Oberpfalz region. Today the word "Zoigl" is still in use and has given its name to this style of beer production.

Zoigl has been brewed for centuries in communal breweries, owned either by the town or by an association of homebrewers. Zoigl was only found in Windischeschenbach and Neuhaus until about 2000. The name and mark have been pilfered because they were not trademarked, leading to the over-advertising of Zoigl beer across Germany. The original comes from Windischeschenbach and Neuhaus, and people have their favorites, because each brewer has their own recipes.

== Process ==
First wood is chopped, the fire started to cook the water and barley to temp, it is cooled over copper, then the wort is distributed to the brewers' private cellars, where the fermentation takes place. The method used is bottom fermenting yeast and lagering. About two weeks later the beer is brought to these home pubs where it is tapped directly from the lagering tank. It is then sold in the brewer's house, which effectively becomes a pub until all the beer has been drunk. The pub that has Zoigl from that Friday through Monday then attaches the Zoigl-Star to the corner of his house to show he has beer available. Only about 9 or 10 people have "das Braurecht" in Windischeschenbach at one time.
