= Seibertsbach =

River in Germany

Location
- Country: Germany
- State: Bavaria

Physical characteristics
- Mouth
  - location: Wondreb
  - coordinates: 49.9574°N 12.2687°E

Basin features
- Progression: Wondreb→ Ohře→ Elbe→ North Sea

Seibertsbach is a river of Bavaria, Germany. It flows into the Wondreb near Mitterteich.

== See also ==
- List of rivers of Bavaria
