= German Continental Deep Drilling Programme =

Scientific deep drilling program

German Continental Deep Drilling Program
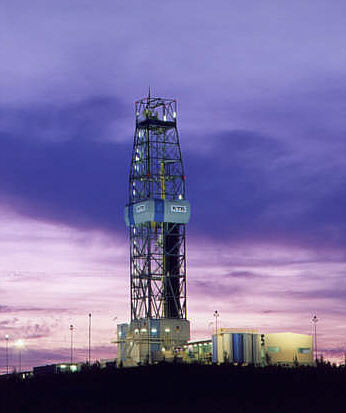
- The drill tower of the main borehole
- Interactive map of German Continental Deep Drilling Program
- Location: Windischeschenbach, Bavaria, Germany; 49°48′55″N 12°07′14″E
- Type: Scientific borehole
- Greatest depth: 9,101 m (29,859 feet; 5.655 miles)
- Opened: 1987
- Active: 1987–1995
- Website: geozentrum-ktb.de

The German Continental Deep Drilling Programme (German: Kontinentales Tiefbohrprogramm der Bundesrepublik Deutschland, lit. 'Continental deep-drilling program of the Federal Republic of Germany'), abbreviated as the KTB borehole, was a scientific drilling project carried out from 1987 to 1995 near Windischeschenbach, Bavaria. The main super-deep borehole reached a depth of 9,101 m (29,859 feet) in the Earth's continental crust.

The Federal Ministry of Research funded the project with 528 million DM (270 million euros). The (Lower Saxony) LBEG mining office (State Office for Mining, Energy and Geology) took the project lead. After the drilling project ended, the German Research Centre for Geosciences used the borehole to install a seismic deep observatory (Tiefenobservatorium) which was active from 1996 to 2001. The derrick used at the site, one of the largest in the world, remains in place and has become a tourist attraction. The two boreholes were kept open for further scientific research and for in-situ testing of equipment and devices.

== History ==
In October 1986 the German Minister for Research and Technology (Bundesminister für Forschung und Technologie), H. Riesenhuber, officially announced that the super-deep borehole of the Continental Deep Drilling Program of the Federal Republic of Germany (KTB) would be drilled in the Upper Palatinate area of Northern Bavaria. This site was selected against an alternative proposed site in the Black Forest area based on recommendations made by the Deutsche Forschungsgemeinschaft (DFG). These were based on evaluations of the technical and financial risks by the project management team. The site recommendation and selection was preceded by a conference held September 19–21, 1986 in Seeheim/Odenwald. Results of the site studies in the Upper Palatinate and the Black Forest were presented and discussed there. Immediately following the conference and evaluation of scientific and technical models and targets, members of the DFG Senate Commission for Geoscientific Interdisciplinary Research voted almost unanimously for the Oberpfalz site. In presenting their decision, the DFG Senate Commission emphasized that while the Upper Palatinate site was favoured in the vote, both locations offered a number of positive research objectives and that both locations were potentially suitable sites for research drilling.

The project drilled 2 different holes, first a pilot hole then the main hole. The pilot hole (KTB Vorbohrung, KTB-VB) was spudded on September 22, 1987, and was finished on April 4, 1989, having reached 4,000 m (13,000 feet). The main hole (KTB Hauptbohrung, KTB-HB) was spudded on October 6, 1990, about 200 m (660 feet) away from the pilot hole. It reached a total depth of 9,101 m (29,859 feet) on October 21, 1994.

== Results ==
The KTB project utilized several innovations to drill design. The Kola drilling experiment had problems with high friction that was increased by the vertical instability when drilling to such depths. German scientists designed a new drill head which would maintain direction with a minimal lateral difference. The drill head was also designed to withstand temperatures between 250 and 300 °C (482 and 572 °F). The original expectations had been that this temperature would be reached at a depth of about 10 to 14 km (33,000 to 46,000 feet). This is also the reason why the Upper Palatinate site was chosen. The Black Forest site had been considered suitable from a scientific view, but it was expected to have a higher temperature gradient. At the Upper Palatinate location, however, it was hoped to reach the Erbendorfkörper – a deep-lying mass that is believed to be on the boundary of a former continental plate and is identified by its characteristic reflection of seismic waves.

Even though the Erbendorfkörper was not reached, the KTB drilling was widely considered a success. For one thing, the temperature rose much more quickly than expected. This caused discussion and a reformulation of theories about the temperature gradient of very deep drill holes. Other theory changes were also required – it had been expected that the large tectonic pressures and high temperatures would create metamorphic rock. Unexpectedly the rock layers were not solid at the depths reached. Instead large amounts of fluid and gas poured into the drill hole. Due to the heat and fluids, the rock was of a dynamic nature which changed how the next super-deep drilling needed to be planned.

The experiments at the KTB produced interesting results. The initial seismic tests showed very different recordings compared to those near the surface so that the theories on the source of seismic reflections needed to change. Using the data, the reflections from depth could be interpreted better even when initiated from the surface.

The first experiment, the "Dipole-Dipole Experiment" measured the electric conductibility around the drill hole. This showed lines of graphite spanning through the rocks that allowed the rocks to slide when under sufficient pressure. The second experiment was to exert high pressure in the drill hole such that the rock would start cracking, the "Integriertes Hydrafrac/Seismik Experiment". The resulting seismic activity was measured at multiple stations in the area. The conclusion was that the overall pressure came from the south, the African tectonic plate at work. The third experiment, the "Fluid/Hydraulik-Test," pumped large amounts of fluid into the rock which proved it to be generally porous.

These experiences were the foundation of the follow-up project, the International Continental Scientific Drilling Program (ICDP) founded in 1996. The German scientists of the KTB cooperated closely with the team of scientists and engineers responsible for the San Andreas Fault Observatory at Depth drill hole. This project, carried out in California from 2002 to 2007, was of similar scale as the KTB.
