= Waldnaab =

River in Germany

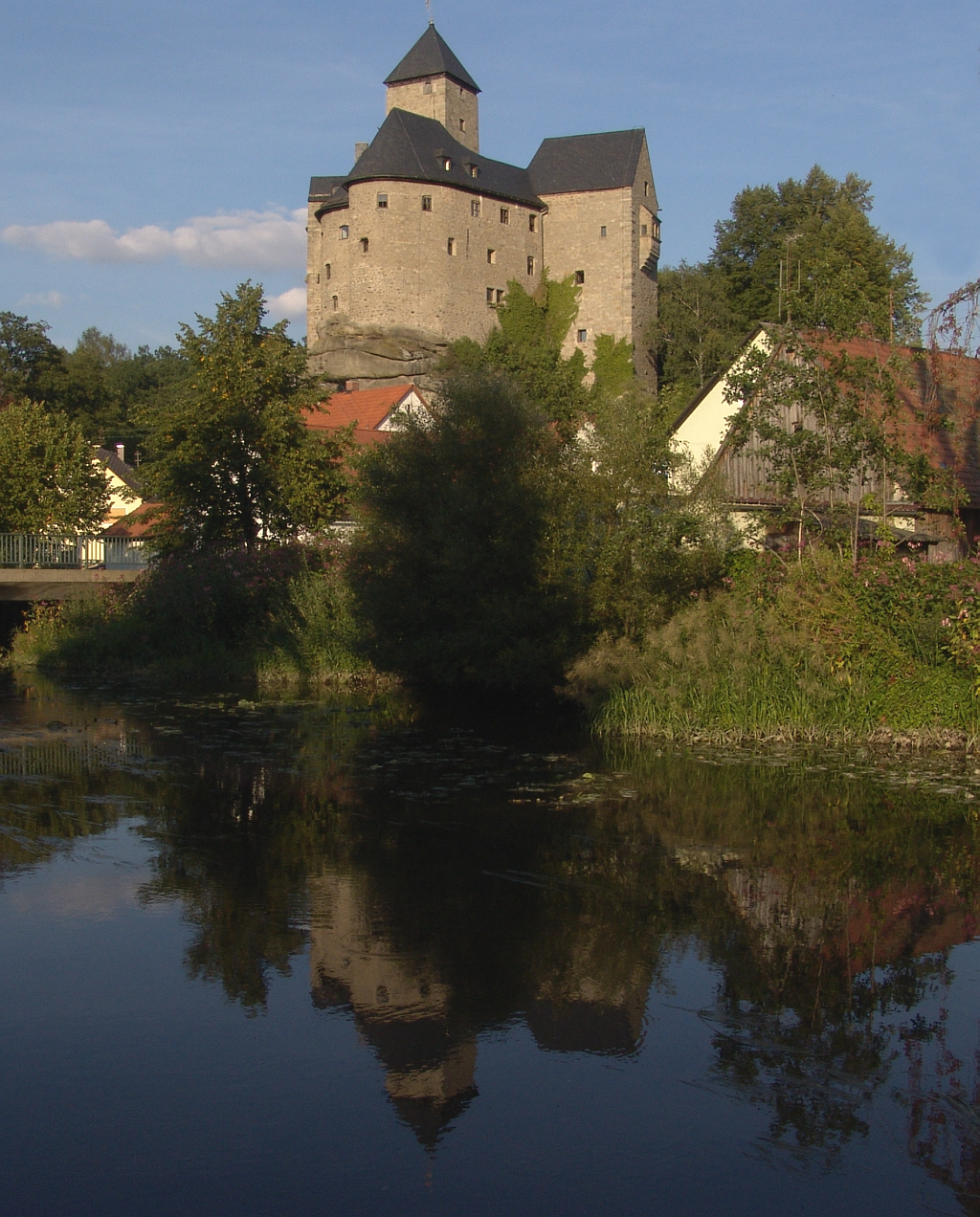
- The Waldnaab near Burg Falkenberg

Location
- Country: Germany
- State: Bavaria
- Reference no.: DE: 14

Physical characteristics
- Source
  - location: on the German-Czech border between Bärnau and Flossenbürg
  - coordinates: 49°45′49″N 12°24′25″E
  - elevation: 814 m above sea level (NN)
- Mouth
  - location: Confluence: of the Waldnaab and Haidenaab with the Naab near Unterwildenau (mun. Luhe-Wildenau)
  - coordinates: 49°36′10″N 12°07′57″E
  - elevation: 379 m above sea level (NN)
- Length: 99.1 km (61.6 mi)
- Basin size: 972 km^{2} (375 sq mi)

Basin features
- Progression: Naab→ Danube→ Black Sea

The Waldnaab (German pronunciation: [ˈvaltˌnaːp]; Northern Bavarian: Woidnaab; Czech: Lesní Nába, in its upper course: Tirschenreuther Waldnaab) is the left-hand, eastern and longest headstream of the River Naab in the Upper Palatinate (Bavaria, Germany). At its confluence with the Haidenaab near Luhe-Wildenau, the Naab is formed. The Waldnaab is 99.1 km long; combined with the Naab, the total length is 196.6 kilometres (122.2 mi).

== Course ==
=== The Tirschenreuth Waldnaab ===
The river rises at 816 m above NN on the German-Czech border in the Upper Palatine Forest not far from the 901 m high Entenbühl and near its smaller brother, the Naabberg (853 m above sea level (NN)). Its source, also called the Kreuzbrunnen, lies in the district of Tirschenreuth, near Silberhütte. From its wellspring the water flows for just under three metres on German soil, before crossing into Bohemia for almost a kilometre, where it is known as the Lesní Nába, and then flowing northwest, re-crossing the German border and reaching Bärnau. As a result of seasonal fluctuations in the water table and the increasing degradation of the wellspring, its water reaches the surface initially a few metres away from the actual spring, then further and further away as the year wears on and eventually appears on the Czech side of the border. During the Cold War the spring was a very popular destination for walkers, even though it was next to the heavily guarded border. When collecting blueberries between the border posts, pickers were often closely watched by uniformed guards from both sides.

The first village that the Waldnaab passes through after leaving the forest is the eponymous Naab. In Bärnau the Waldnaab bends towards the west and flows through the Liebenstein flood retention basin, about 88 hectares (220 acres) in area, a little way below Bärnau-Thanhausen and north of Plößberg. Next it swings northwards and reaches the village of Tirschenreuth, where it turns west again and flows through the Waldnaabaue (Waldnaab water meadows), meandering its way through the many lakes in the area.

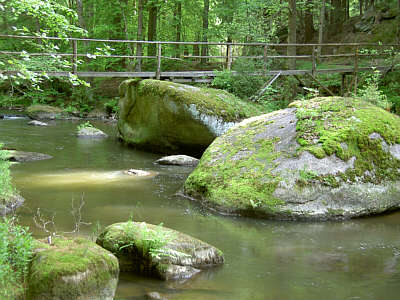
Giant rocks in the Waldnaab valley

Passing Falkenberg Castle in Falkenberg it flows southwest and reaches the rocky Waldnaabtal (Waldnaab valley), where the stream is at its most picturesque over the next 12 kilometres. Here, water erosion has carved a valley in the granitic bedrock surrounded by woods. Beyond that it is joined at Neuhaus/Windischeschenbach by the Fichtelnaab approaching from the northwest.

=== The Waldnaab below Windischeschenbach ===
From there the Waldnaab heads south, accompanied most of the way by the A 93 motorway and the B 15 federal road, flowing through Neustadt, Altenstadt and Weiden, where it picks up the Schweinnaab coming from the west, before reaching Luhe-Wildenau. There it is joined in the village of Unterwildenau by the Haidenaab to form the Naab, which flows into the River Danube near Regensburg-Mariaort.

== Waldnaab Valley ==
The rich natural environment of the Waldnaab Valley is very popular, particularly with walkers. The erosion of granite has produced a great number of rock formations, such as the Kammerwagen, the Tischstein or the Butterfass in this nature reserve. There are also the sites of three old castles on the rocks of Altneuhaus, Herrenstein and Schwarzenschwal.

== Largest tributaries ==
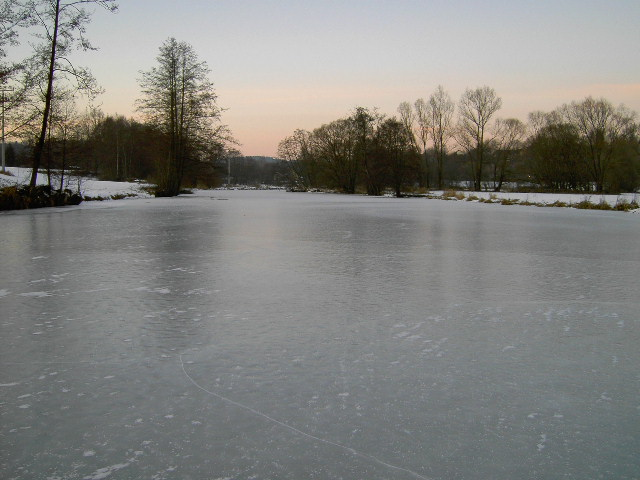
The frozen Waldnaab near Neustadt

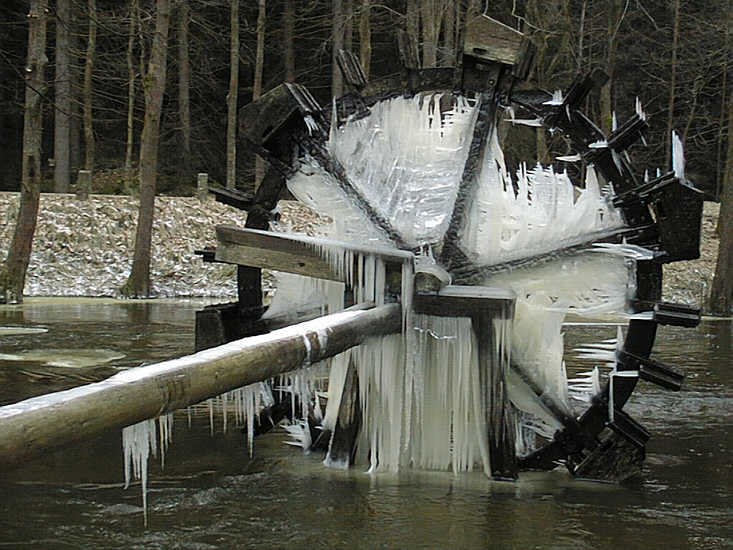
A frozen scoop wheel

Left tributaries	Right tributaries
The Tirschenreuth Waldnaab (ca. 62 km)
Röthenbach (Bartmühle); Kaltenmühlbach (Bartmühle); Silberbach (Hohenthan); Geisbach (in Liebenstein Basin); Netzbach (Falkenberg); Frombach (in Falkenberg Forest)	Steinbach (Bärnau); Heiligenbach (Heimhof); Schwarzenbach (Liebenstein); Gründlbach (Tirschenreuth); Netzbach (Tirschenreuth); Kainzbach (in Hohenwald Forest); Wiesau (in Schönhaid Forest); Tirschnitzbach (in Schönhaid Forest); Fichtelnaab (Windischeschenbach)
The Waldnaab below Windischeschenbach (ca. 37 km)
Schleißbach (Windischeschenbach); Kotzenbach (Hutzlmühle); Schlatteinbach (Lamplmühle); Floß (Neustadt); Almesbach (Weiden)	Rumpelbach (Windischeschenbach); Pöllenbach (Hutzlmühle); Schweinnaab (Weiden); Rothenstadter Bach (Rothenstadt)
In brackets the location of its confluence with the Waldnaab.

== Sources ==
- Die Naab – mit Waldnaab, Fichtelnaab, Haidenaab. 144 Seiten, Pustet, Regensburg.(ISBN 3-7917-1915-7)
