= Hohlbach (Haidenaab) =

River in Germany

Location
- Country: Germany
- State: Bavaria

Physical characteristics
- Mouth
  - location: Haidenaab
  - coordinates: 49.6516°N 12.0368°E

Hohlbach (German pronunciation: [ˈhoːlbax]) is a small river of Bavaria, Germany. It is a left tributary of the Haidenaab near Mantel.

== See also ==
- List of rivers of Bavaria
