= Wondreb =

River in Germany and the Czech Republic

Wondreb Odrava
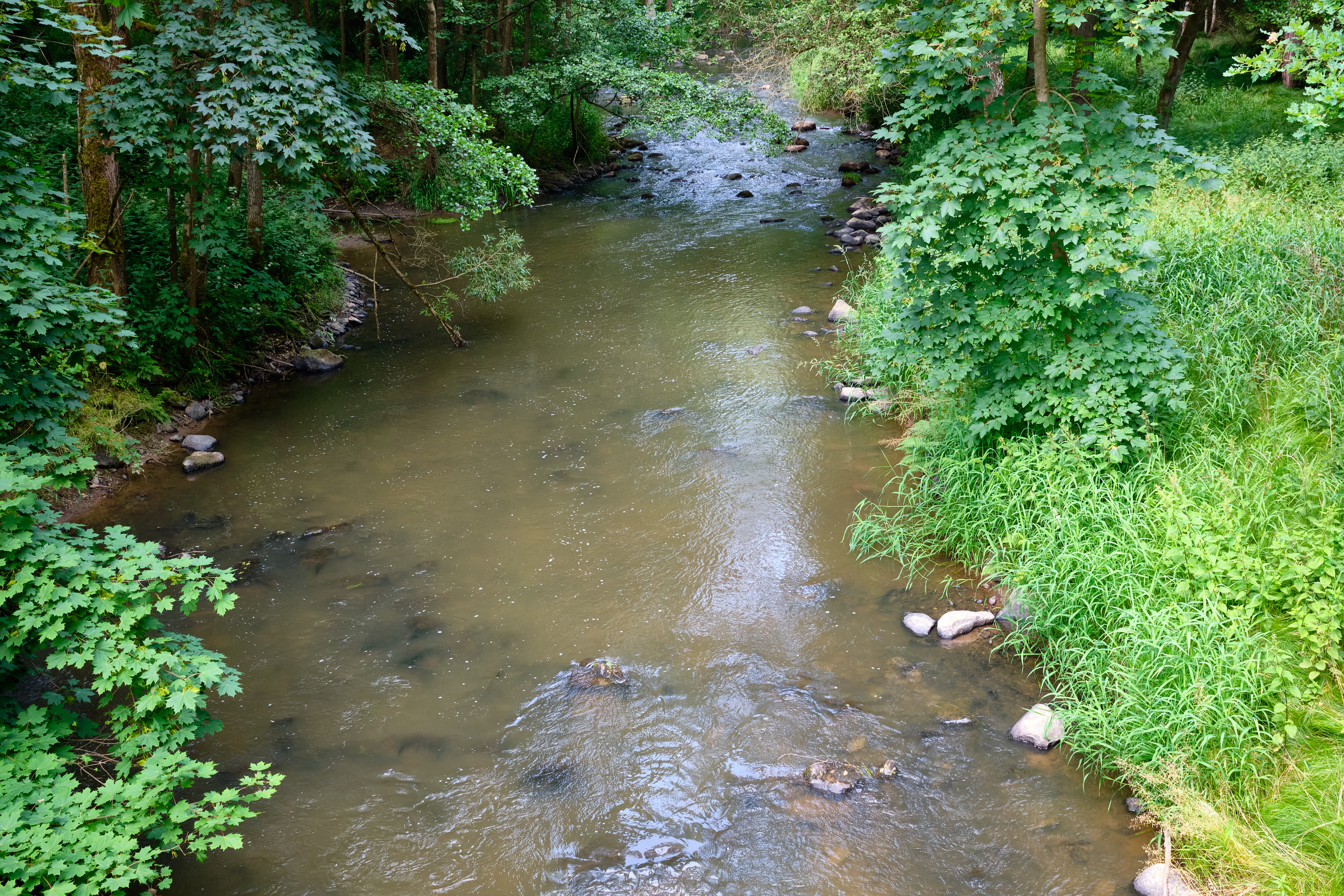
- The Wondreb in Cheb-Starý Hrozňatov

Location
- Countries: Germany; Czech Republic
- State/ Region: Bavaria; Karlovy Vary

Physical characteristics
- Source
  - location: Stará Voda, Upper Palatine Forest
  - coordinates: 49°56′28″N 12°29′53″E
  - elevation: 745 m (2,444 ft)
- Mouth
  - location: Ohře
  - coordinates: 50°6′37″N 12°29′6″E
  - elevation: 416 m (1,365 ft)
- Length: 66.1 km (41.1 mi)
- Basin size: 507.1 km^{2} (195.8 sq mi)
- Discharge
  - average: 3.95 m^{3}/s (139 cu ft/s) near estuary

Basin features
- Progression: Ohře→ Elbe→ North Sea

The Wondreb (Czech: Odrava; called Nikolausbach upstream, Czech: Mikulášský potok) is a river in Germany and the Czech Republic, a right tributary of the Ohře River. It flows through Bavaria and Karlovy Vary Region. It is 66.1 km (41.1 mi) long.

== Etymology ==
Both the German and the Czech name have their origin in Proto-Indo-European ad-ra, meaning 'flowing water'.

== Characteristic ==
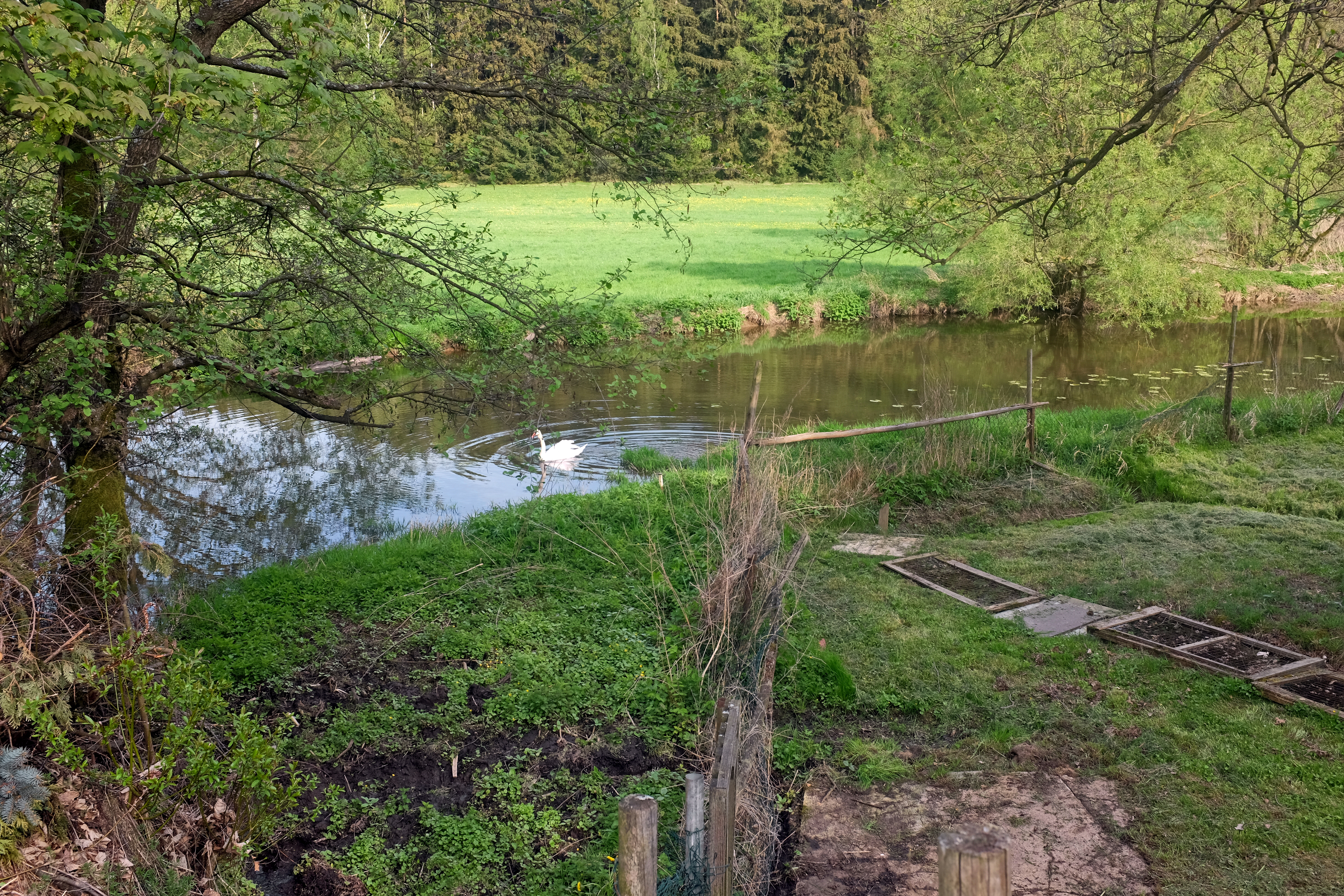
The Wondreb near Waldsassen

The Wondreb originates in the territory of Stará Voda in the Upper Palatine Forest at an elevation of 745 m (2,444 ft) and until its confluence with the brook Griesbach, it is known as Nikolausbach/Mikulášský potok. The river flows to Odrava, where it merges with the Ohře River at an elevation of 416 m (1,365 ft). It is 66.1 km (41.1 mi) long, of which 48.1 km (29.9 mi) is in Germany, 16.8 km (10.4 mi) is in the Czech Republic and 1.2 km (0.7 mi) forms the Czech–German border. Its drainage basin has an area of 507.1 km^{2} (195.8 sq mi), of which 311.0 km^{2} (120.1 sq mi) is in Germany and 196.1 km^{2} (75.7 sq mi) is in the Czech Republic.

The longest tributaries of the Wondreb are:

Tributary	Length (km)	Side
Lipoltovský potok	21.5	right
Muglbach / Mohelenský potok	19.1	right
Seibertsbach	16.5	left
Stebnický potok	12.9	right

== Course ==
For 0.5 km (0.3 mi), the river flows through the territory of Stará Voda, then it forms the Czech–German border for the next 0.5 km. The river further flows through the territories of Mähring, Tirschenreuth, Leonberg, Mitterteich and Waldsassen in Germany, before it forms the Czech–German border for the next 0.7 km (0.4 mi). Then the river continues through the territories of Cheb and Odrava in the Czech Republic.

== Bodies of water ==
A significant body of water built on the Wondreb is Jesenice Reservoir, located in the territory of Cheb. It was built in 1957–1961 on an area of 7.6 km^{2} (2.9 sq mi). The main purposes are to ensure minimum flow for industrial enterprises and flood protection.

== See also ==
- List of rivers of Bavaria
- List of rivers of the Czech Republic
