= Odrava =

- Municipality
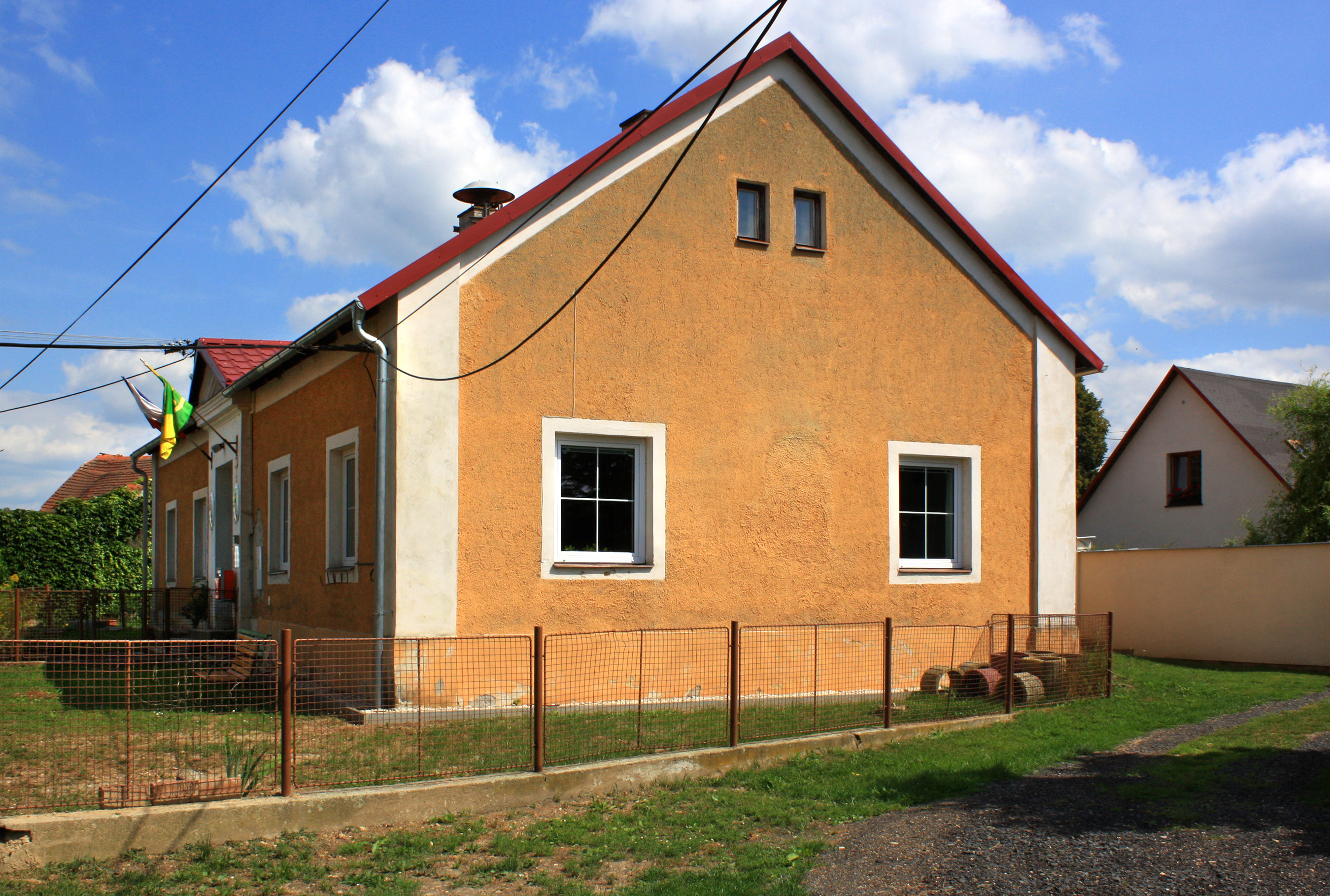
- Municipal office

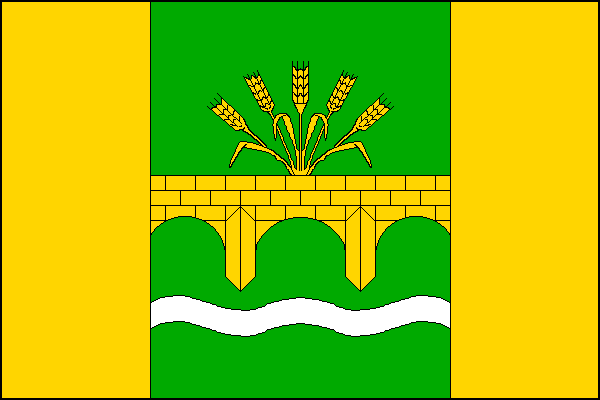
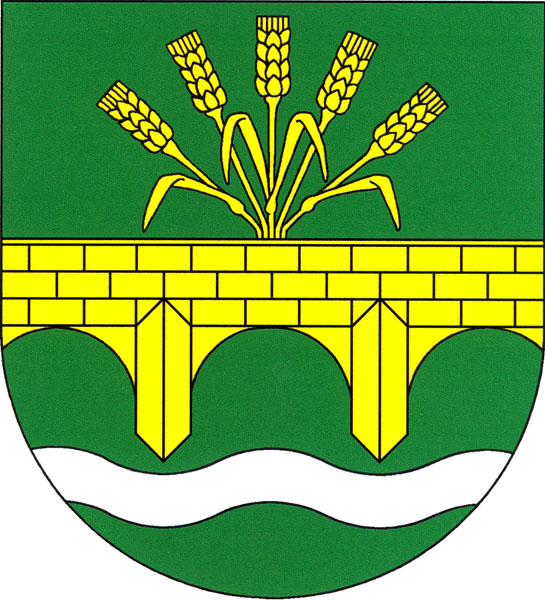
- Flag Coat of arms

- Location in the Czech Republic
- Coordinates: 50°6′11″N 12°29′3″E
- Country: Czech Republic
- Region: Karlovy Vary
- District: Cheb
- First mentioned: 1370

Area
  - Total: 12.65 km^{2} (4.88 sq mi)
- Elevation: 422 m (1,385 ft)

Population (2026-01-01)
  - Total: 238
  - Density: 18.8/km^{2} (48.7/sq mi)
- Time zone: UTC+1 (CET)
  - Summer (DST): UTC+2 (CEST)
- Postal code: 350 02
- Website: www.obec-odrava.cz

Odrava (German: Kulsam) is a municipality and village in Cheb District in the Karlovy Vary Region of the Czech Republic. It has about 200 inhabitants.

== Administrative division ==
Odrava consists of five municipal parts (in brackets population according to the 2021 census):

- Odrava (73)
- Dobroše (22)
- Mostov (41)
- Obilná (38)
- Potočiště (49)

== Etymology ==
Until 1948, the German name Kulsam was used both in Czech and German. The origin of the name is uncertain. There is a theory that the initial name of the village was Kolbesheim, meaning "Kolb's/Kolbe's home". In 1948, it was renamed Odrava after the local river.

== Geography ==
Odrava is located about 8 kilometres (5 mi) northeast of Karlovy Vary and 29 km (18 mi) southwest of Karlovy Vary. It lies in the Cheb Basin. It is situated on the right bank of the Ohře River, at its confluence with the Wondreb River (here called Odrava).

== History ==
The first written mention of Odrava is from 1370. Obilná was first mentioned in 1266 and Potočiště in 1312. Mostov was first mentioned in 1362 and served as the centre of the estate. The youngest village is Hlinová, which was first mentioned in 1606.

== Demographics ==
Historical population

Year	Pop.	±%
1869	886	—
1880	828	−6.5%
1890	766	−7.5%
1900	713	−6.9%
1910	744	+4.3%

Year	Pop.	±%
1921	700	−5.9%
1930	787	+12.4%
1950	373	−52.6%
1961	299	−19.8%
1970	262	−12.4%

Year	Pop.	±%
1980	229	−12.6%
1991	204	−10.9%
2001	198	−2.9%
2011	223	+12.6%
2021	223	+0.0%

Source: Censuses

== Transport ==
The D6 motorway from Karlovy Vary to Cheb runs through the municipality.

== Sights ==
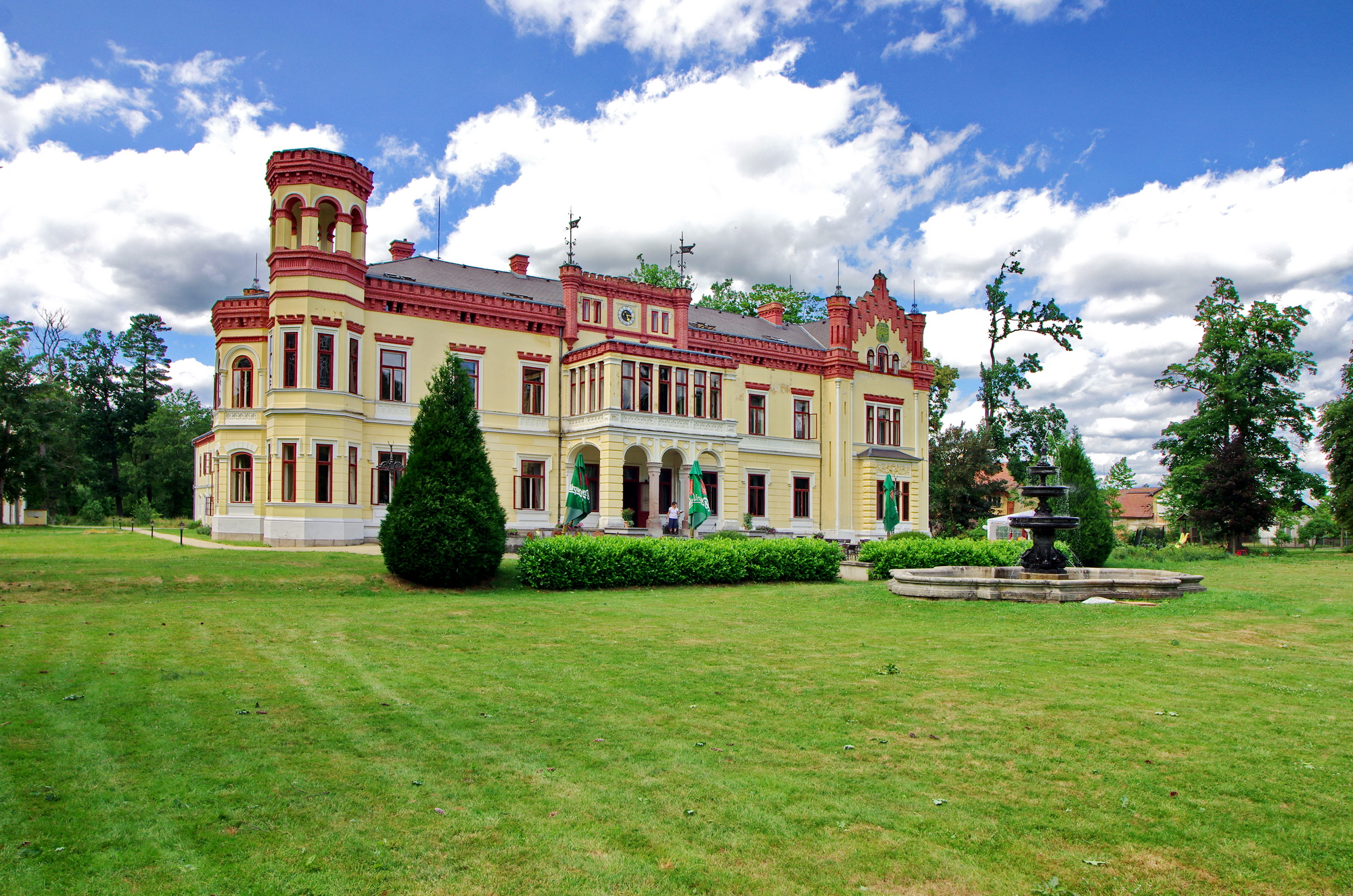
Mostov Castle

The most important monument of the municipality is the Mostov Castle. It was built in the Romantic style in the mid-19th century, on the site of an older building from the 14th century. The castle is privately owned and is used as a hotel and for commercial purposes.
