= International Continental Scientific Drilling Program =

Multinational program in the field geoscience

- Abbreviation: ICDP
- Formation: 1996
- Type: INGO
- Headquarters: Potsdam Germany
- Region served: Worldwide
- Official language: English
- Parent organization: GFZ German Research Centre for Geosciences
- Website: ICDP Official website

The International Continental Scientific Drilling Program is a multinational program to further and fund geosciences in the field of continental scientific drilling. Scientific drilling is a critical tool in understanding of Earth processes and structure. It provides direct insight into Earth processes and critically tests geological models. Results obtained from drilling projects at critical sites can be applied to other areas worldwide. It is, therefore, believed that international cooperation in continental scientific drilling is an essential component for a responsible management strategy for the Earth's natural resources and environment.

The ICDP was founded in February 1996 in the German Embassy in Tokyo as a result of the German Continental Deep Drilling Program (KTB; 1987-1995). The GFZ German Research Centre for Geosciences serves as the headquarters for both the current ICDP and the former KTB project.

== Motivation ==
ICDP supports international science teams with a proven need for continental-based drilling. The proposed projects help to answer societal challenges related to dynamics of planet Earth, contributing to major advances in understanding Earth's environment and life, sustainable geo- and energy resources, as well as safeguarding from natural disasters.

== Research Areas ==
=== Climate & Ecosystems ===
ICDP proposals seek to help understand how both the climate and the environment have changed on global and regional scales. Areas of research within this theme include paleoclimate studies investigating the manner in which Earth's past climate has changed, the reasons for such changes, as well as the role of environmental forcing in human evolution, for example in the Eastern Rift Valley of Africa. Other ICDP proposals focus on the effects of volcanism and major impacts on climate and mass extinctions. Deep biosphere research has also become an important component of drilling projects to help get a better understanding of evolution and extent of life on Earth. Other proponents of deep-life that coincide with ICDP goals include addressing metabolic rates, carbon cycling, and energy sources of subsurface microbial activity, how microbial life has adapted to the more extreme conditions of subsurface habitats, and the role of the deep biosphere on the geosphere and atmosphere.

=== Sustainable Georesources ===
There is a rise in demand for renewable and clean energy resources to reduce dependence on fossil fuels. Knowing the composition, structure and evolution of Earth's crust can help to understand how best to manage and use Earth's resources and environment. Research is needed in this area to determine sustainable practices in exploring and exploiting natural resources. ICDP undertakes a variety of scientific drilling projects to study the origin of mineral resources and to discover new unconventional resources such as gas hydrates and geothermal energy.

Research areas within sustainable georesources include the nature of the deep biosphere and its relation to geologic processes such as hydrocarbon maturation, ore deposition and energy resources, the origin and evolution of sedimentary basins and hydrocarbon resources, and the role of various geologic settings, including volcanoes and plate boundaries, in ore deposit formation. Other georesource studies include understanding the stresses, such as urbanization and sea-level-rise, on freshwater resources and heat and mass transfer. The transfer of heat and mass, i.e. magma, hot fluids, groundwater and sediment, controls the concentration of metals and hydrocarbons as well as providing renewable geothermal energy resources.

=== Natural Hazards ===
ICDP has accepted many proposals related to formation, potential hazard, and mitigation associated with fault boundaries, volcanoes, impact structures and plate margins. Topics include, but are not limited to, earthquakes generated on fault boundaries like San Andreas Fault and North Anatolian Fault Zone, geophysical and geochemical properties of different volcanic sources, impact basin evolution and effect on Earth's environment and ecology, and tsunamis generation.

== Proposal Procedure ==
The International Continental Scientific Drilling Program accepts proposals each year by January 15 from individual or groups of scientists from member countries (See Members). Proposals are selected based primarily on scientific merits and expected impacts. The steps from project to proposal include submission of a pre-proposal letter by the Principal Investigators followed by the development of Workshop Proposal and Full Proposal if the pre-proposal is recommended.

== Members ==
Currently, Australia, Austria, Belgium, Canada, China, the Czech Republic, Finland, France, Germany, Iceland, India, Israel, Italy, Japan, New Zealand, Norway, Poland, South Korea, Spain, Sweden, Switzerland, the Netherlands, United Kingdom, United States and UNESCO are members of the ICDP.

== See also ==
- Integrated Ocean Drilling Program
