= Muglbach =

River in Germany

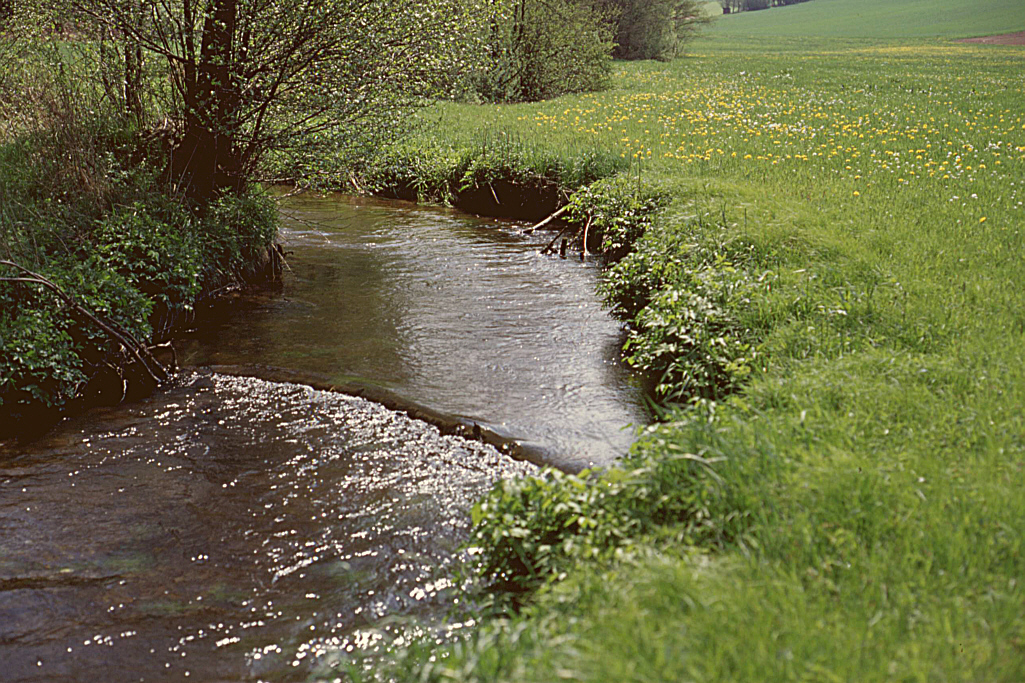
- The Muglbach in the norther part of the Upper Palatine Forest
- Native name: Mohelský potok (Czech)

Location
- Countries: Germany; Czech Republic
- State (DE): Bavaria
- Region (CZ): Karlovy Vary

Physical characteristics
- Source
  - elevation: 700 m (2,300 ft)
- Mouth
  - location: Wondreb
  - coordinates: 50°02′08″N 12°23′57″E
  - elevation: 445 m (1,460 ft)
- Length: 19.1 km (11.9 mi)

Basin features
- Progression: Wondreb→ Ohře→ Elbe→ North Sea

Muglbach (Czech: Mohelský potok) is a river of Bavaria, Germany and the Czech Republic. It flows into the Wondreb (Odrava) near Cheb.

== See also ==
- List of rivers of Bavaria
- List of rivers of the Czech Republic
