= Bad Neualbenreuth =

- Municipality
- Coat of arms

- Location of Bad Neualbenreuth within Tirschenreuth district
- Interactive map of Bad Neualbenreuth
- Location within Germany Location within Bavaria
- Coordinates: 49°58′N 12°26′E
- Country: Germany
- State: Bavaria
- Admin. region: Oberpfalz
- District: Tirschenreuth
- Subdivisions: 17 Ortsteile

Government
  - Mayor (2020–26): Klaus Meyer

Area
  - Total: 50.13 km^{2} (19.36 sq mi)
- Elevation: 558 m (1,831 ft)

Population (2025-12-31)
  - Total: 1,389
  - Density: 27.71/km^{2} (71.76/sq mi)
- Time zone: UTC+01:00 (CET)
  - Summer (DST): UTC+02:00 (CEST)
- Postal codes: 95698
- Dialling codes: 09638
- Vehicle registration: TIR
- Website: www.neualbenreuth.de

Bad Neualbenreuth (before September 2019: Neualbenreuth) is a municipality in the district of Tirschenreuth in Bavaria, Germany.
