= Schweinnaab =

River in Germany

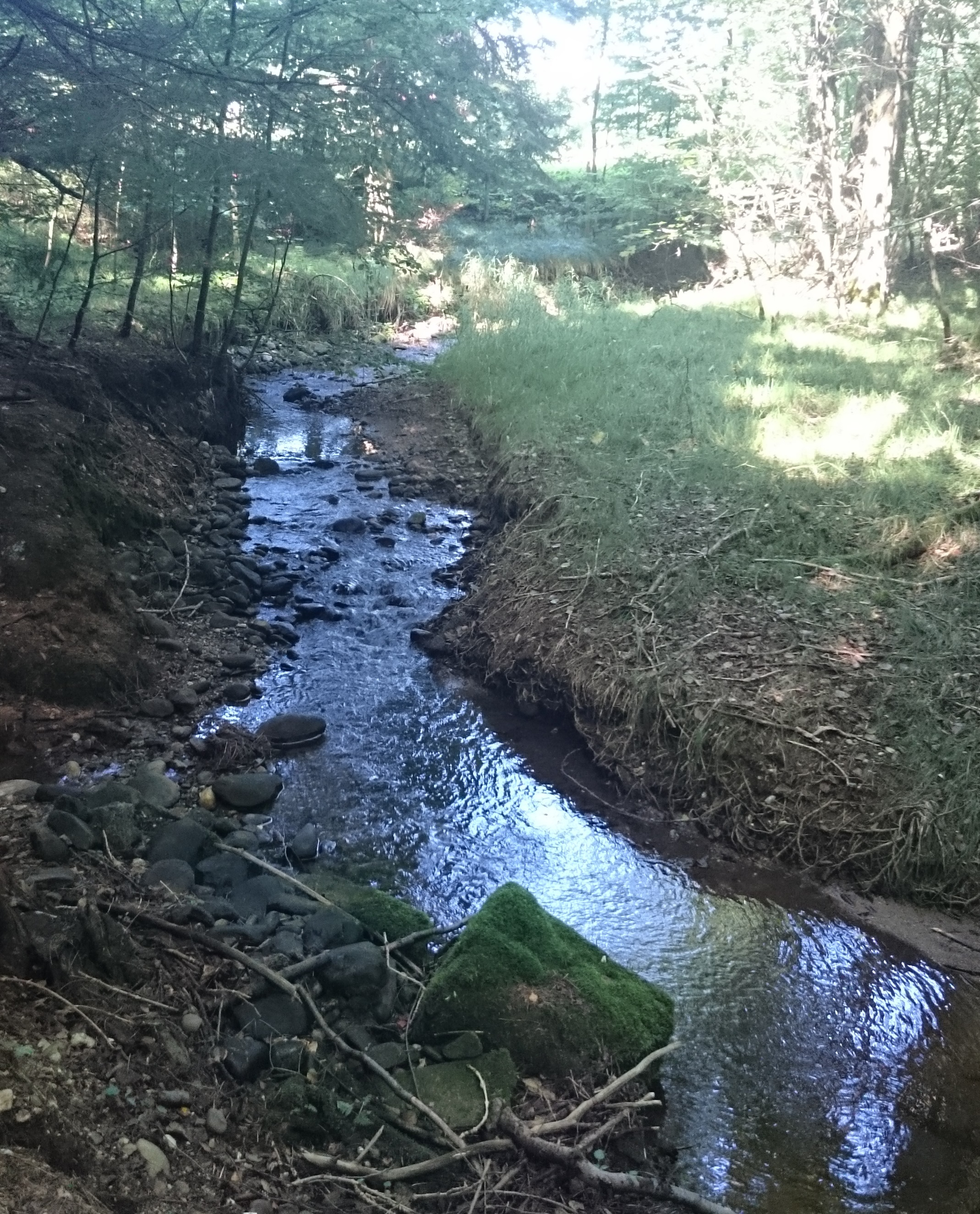
- The Schweinnaab near Herzogspitz, a borough of Pressath

Location
- Country: Germany
- State: Bavaria

Physical characteristics
- Mouth
  - location: Waldnaab
  - coordinates: 49.6820°N 12.1738°E
- Length: 26.0 km (16.2 mi)

Basin features
- Progression: Waldnaab→ Naab→ Danube→ Black Sea

Schweinnaab is a river of Bavaria, Germany. It flows into the Waldnaab in Weiden in der Oberpfalz.

== See also ==
- List of rivers of Bavaria
