= Windischeschenbach =

- Town
- Coat of arms

- Location of Windischeschenbach within Neustadt a.d.Waldnaab district
- Interactive map of Windischeschenbach
- Location within Germany Location within Bavaria
- Coordinates: 49°48′N 12°10′E
- Country: Germany
- State: Bavaria
- Admin. region: Oberpfalz
- District: Neustadt a.d.Waldnaab
- Subdivisions: 3 Ortsteile

Government
  - Mayor (2020–26): Karlheinz Budnik (CSU)

Area
  - Total: 36.37 km^{2} (14.04 sq mi)
- Elevation: 438 m (1,437 ft)

Population (2025-12-31)
  - Total: 4,886
  - Density: 134.3/km^{2} (347.9/sq mi)
- Time zone: UTC+01:00 (CET)
  - Summer (DST): UTC+02:00 (CEST)
- Postal codes: 92670
- Dialling codes: 09681
- Vehicle registration: NEW
- Website: www.windischeschenbach.de

Windischeschenbach (German pronunciation: [vɪndɪʃˈʔɛʃn̩bax]; Bavarian: Eschawo) is a town in the district of Neustadt an der Waldnaab, in Bavaria, Germany. It is situated 14 km (8.7 mi) north of Weiden in der Oberpfalz.

The German Continental Deep Drilling Programme, which reached a super-deep maximum depth of 9,101 metres (29,859 ft), is located near Windischeschenbach.

Windischeschenbach is generally considered the centre of Zoigl beer.
