= Bärnau =

- Town
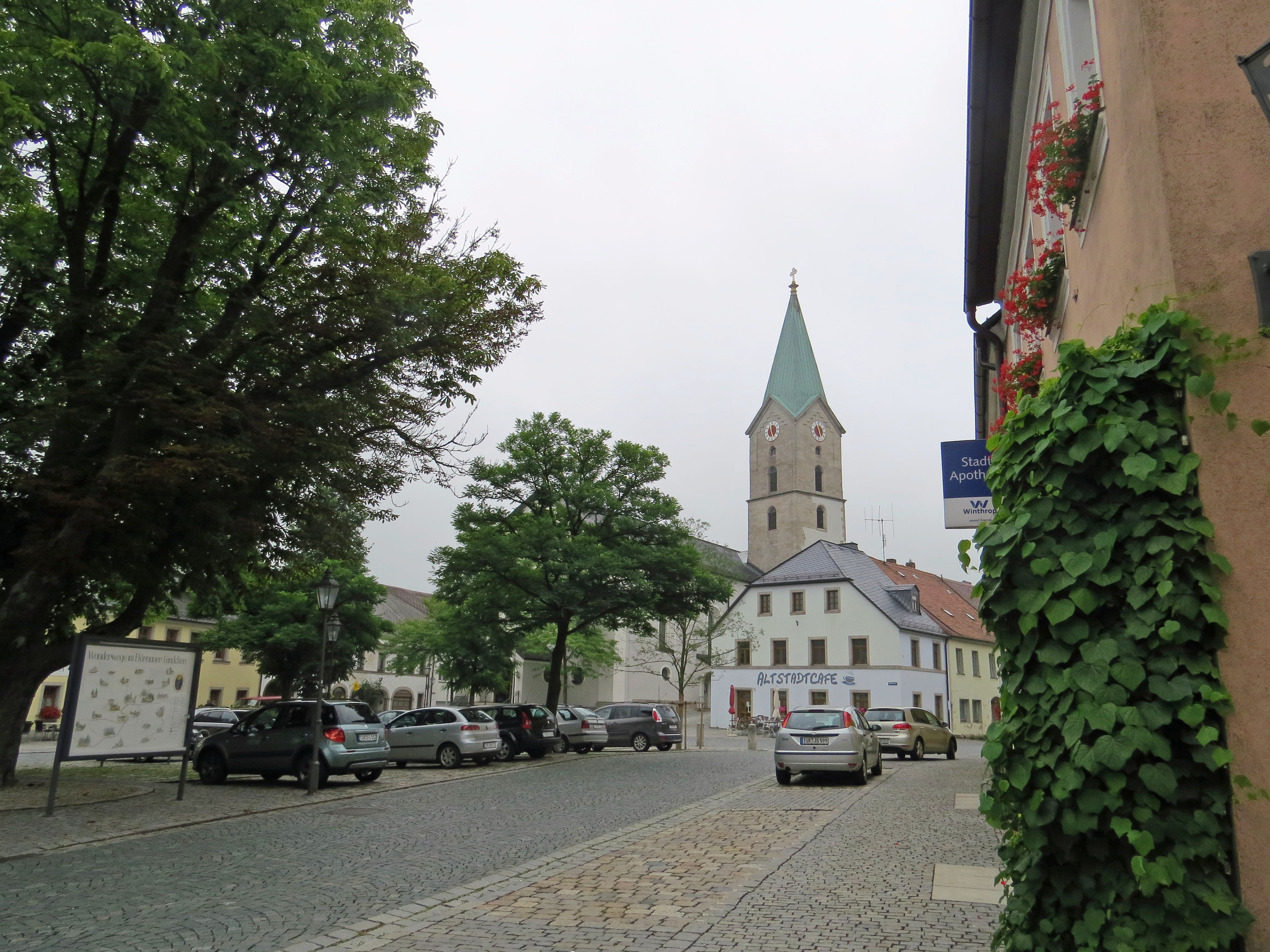
- Market square in Bärnau

- Coat of arms

- Location of Bärnau within Tirschenreuth district
- Interactive map of Bärnau
- Location within Germany Location within Bavaria
- Coordinates: 49°48′37″N 12°26′10″E
- Country: Germany
- State: Bavaria
- Admin. region: Oberpfalz
- District: Tirschenreuth

Government
  - Mayor (2020–26): Alfred Stier (CSU)

Area
  - Total: 74.41 km^{2} (28.73 sq mi)
- Elevation: 615 m (2,018 ft)

Population (2025-12-31)
  - Total: 2,972
  - Density: 39.94/km^{2} (103.4/sq mi)
- Time zone: UTC+01:00 (CET)
  - Summer (DST): UTC+02:00 (CEST)
- Postal codes: 95671
- Dialling codes: 09635
- Vehicle registration: TIR
- Website: www.baernau.de

Bärnau (German pronunciation: [ˈbɛʁnaʊ]) is a town in the district of Tirschenreuth, Bavaria, Germany. It is situated near the border with the Czech Republic, 25 km northeast of Weiden in der Oberpfalz, and 26 km southwest of Mariánské Lázně. It obtained town privileges in 1343, making it the oldest town in the district.

== Culture and places of interest ==
=== Buildings ===
- German Button Museum
- Grenzland Tower
- Steinberg Church, baroque Wieskirche zum gegeißelten Heiland
- Lime tree avenue to the Steinberg Church
- Town centre and market place
- Baroque St. Bartholomew's Church in Hohenthan
- Baroque St. Michael's Church in Schwarzenbach
- Castle in Thanhausen
- Village chapel in Ellenfeld
- Place of Meeting (Ort der Begegnung)
- Festival stage and membrane roof in the abbey gardens
- Bärnau-Tachov History Park

=== Music ===
- Thanhausen Brass Band
- Grenzlandboum Bärnau Town and Youth Band

=== Sport ===
- Altglashütte woodland open-air pool
- Bärnau swimming baths
- TSV Bärnau football team
- VfB Thanhausen football team
- TC Bärnau tennis club
- Silberhütte cross-country skiing centre
- Bärnau Archery Club
- KC Bärnau Bowling Club

=== Events ===
- Biennial historic market spectaculum
- German - Czech festival games
