= Mantel, Germany =

Mantel
- Municipality
- Coat of arms

- Location of Mantel within Neustadt a.d.Waldnaab district
- Interactive map of Mantel
- Location within Germany Location within Bavaria
- Coordinates: 49°38′N 12°03′E
- Country: Germany
- State: Bavaria
- Admin. region: Oberpfalz
- District: Neustadt a.d.Waldnaab

Government
  - Mayor (2019–25): Richard Kammerer (CSU)

Area
  - Total: 16.84 km^{2} (6.50 sq mi)
- Elevation: 400 m (1,300 ft)

Population (2025-12-31)
  - Total: 2,793
  - Density: 165.9/km^{2} (429.6/sq mi)
- Time zone: UTC+01:00 (CET)
  - Summer (DST): UTC+02:00 (CEST)
- Postal codes: 92708
- Dialling codes: 09605
- Vehicle registration: NEW
- Website: www.markt-mantel.com

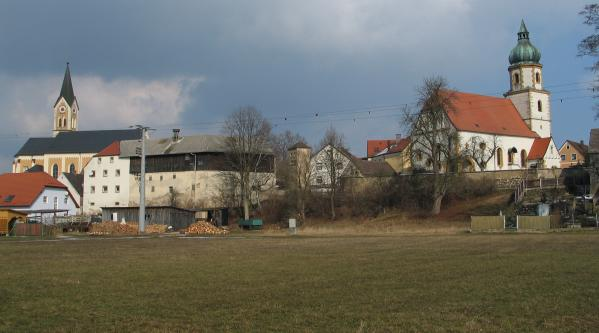
Centre of Mantel, on the left the Catholic parish church, on the right the Protestant parish church

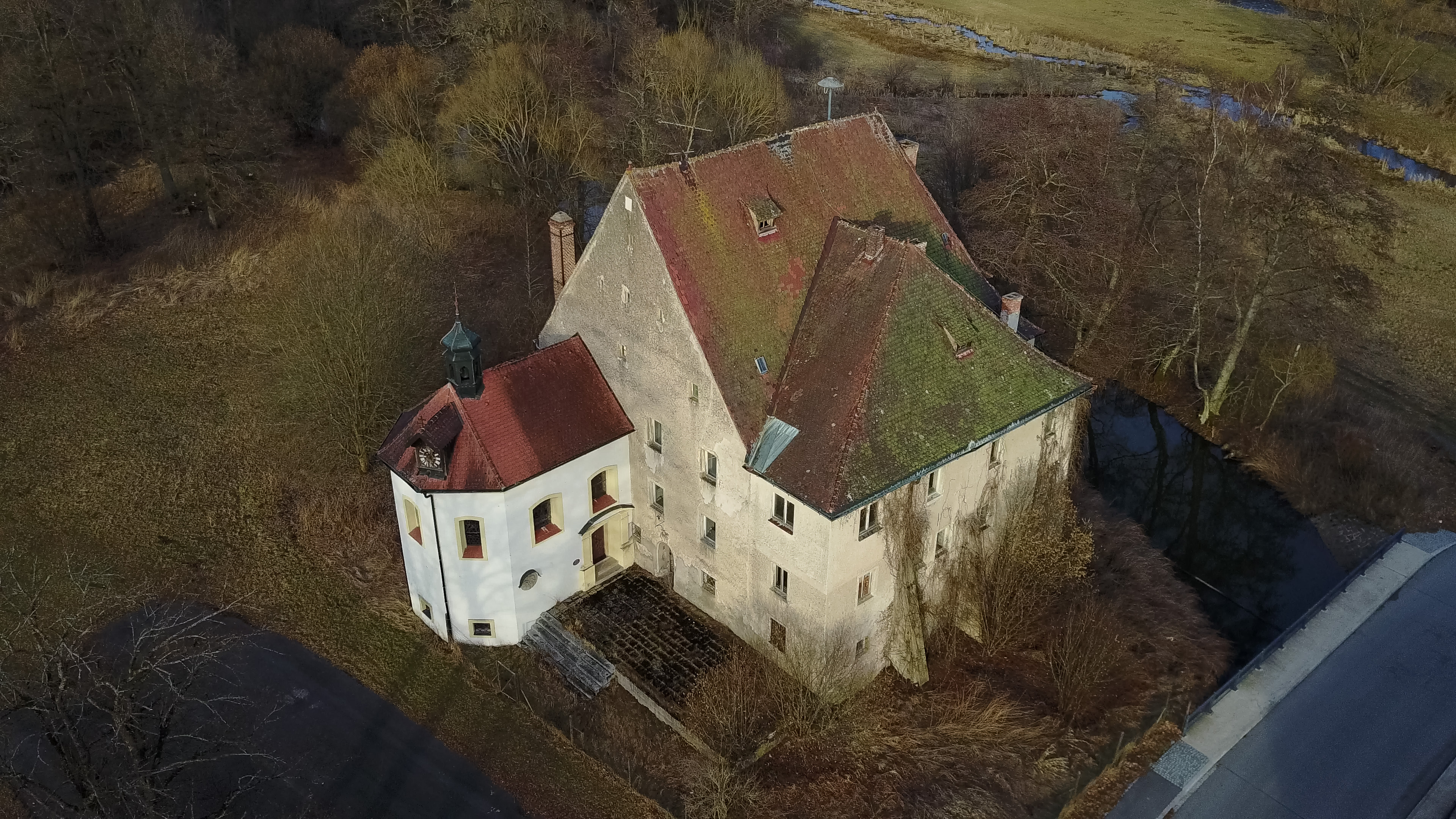
Schloss Steinfels

Mantel (German pronunciation: [ˈmantl̩]) is a municipality located in the district of Neustadt an der Waldnaab in Bavaria, Germany. It is known as a Markt, a town that was historically granted 'market rights'. The town was first mentioned in official documents in 1212, and in 1945 it was incorporated into the municipality of Rupprechtsreuth. As part of the regional reform in Bavaria, parts of the dissolved municipality of Hütten were added to it in 1972. The town's population fell by 77 people, 2.8%, to 2728 between 1988 and 2018. Mantel is best known for its nature preserve, Naturwaldreservat Gscheibte Loh, as well as its castle, Schloss Steinfels.
