= Plößberg =

- Municipality
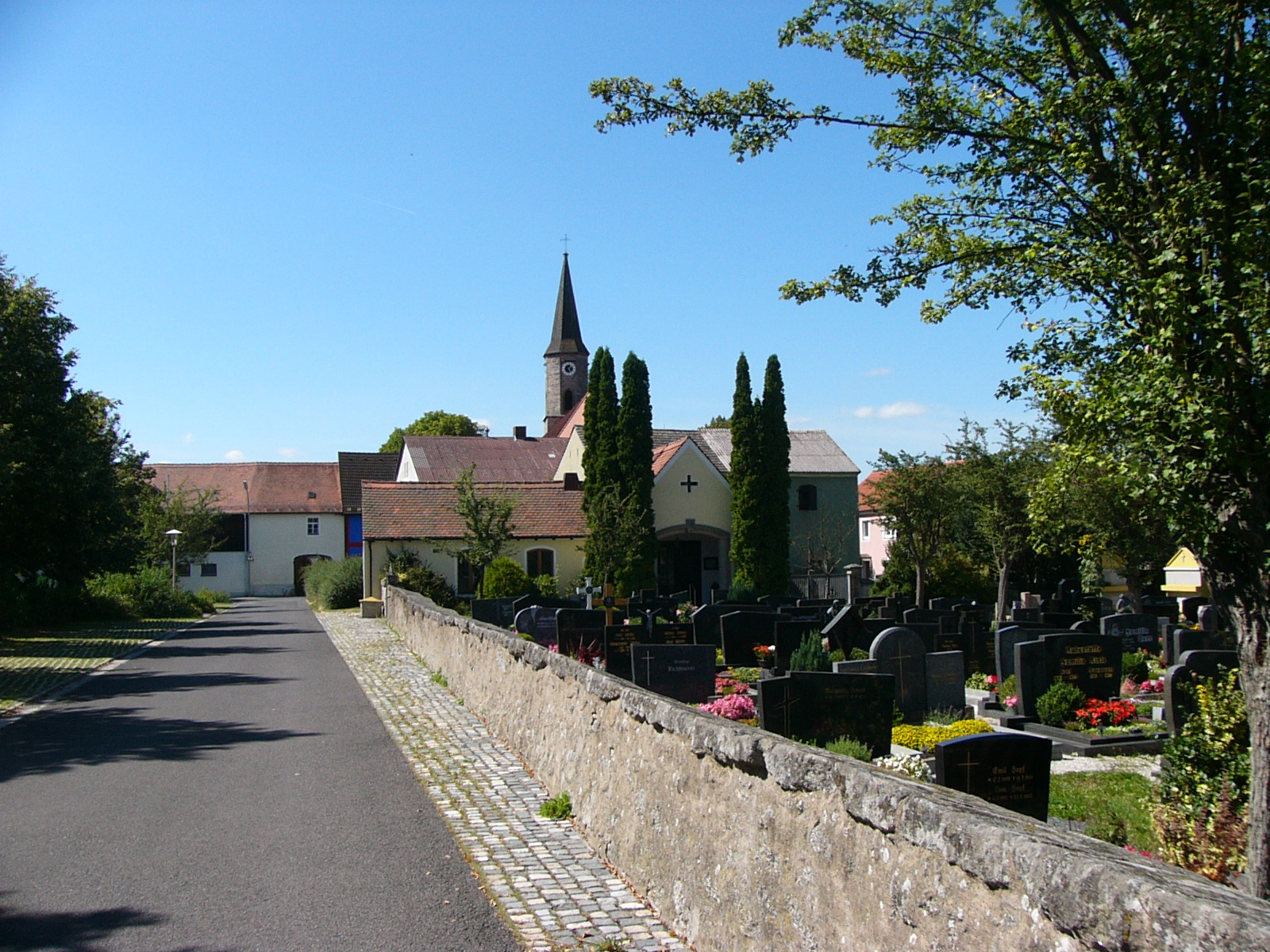
- Plößberg

- Coat of arms

- Location of Plößberg within Tirschenreuth district
- Interactive map of Plößberg
- Location within Germany Location within Bavaria
- Coordinates: 49°47′0″N 12°18′30″E
- Country: Germany
- State: Bavaria
- Admin. region: Oberpfalz
- District: Tirschenreuth
- Subdivisions: 36 Ortsteile

Government
  - Mayor (2020–26): Lothar Müller (CSU)

Area
  - Total: 74.10 km^{2} (28.61 sq mi)
- Elevation: 600 m (2,000 ft)

Population (2025-12-31)
  - Total: 3,108
  - Density: 41.94/km^{2} (108.6/sq mi)
- Time zone: UTC+01:00 (CET)
  - Summer (DST): UTC+02:00 (CEST)
- Postal codes: 95703
- Dialling codes: 09636
- Vehicle registration: TIR
- Website: www.ploessberg.de

Plößberg is a municipality in the district of Tirschenreuth in Bavaria, Germany.
