= Neustadt an der Waldnaab =

Neustadt a.d.Waldnaab
- Town
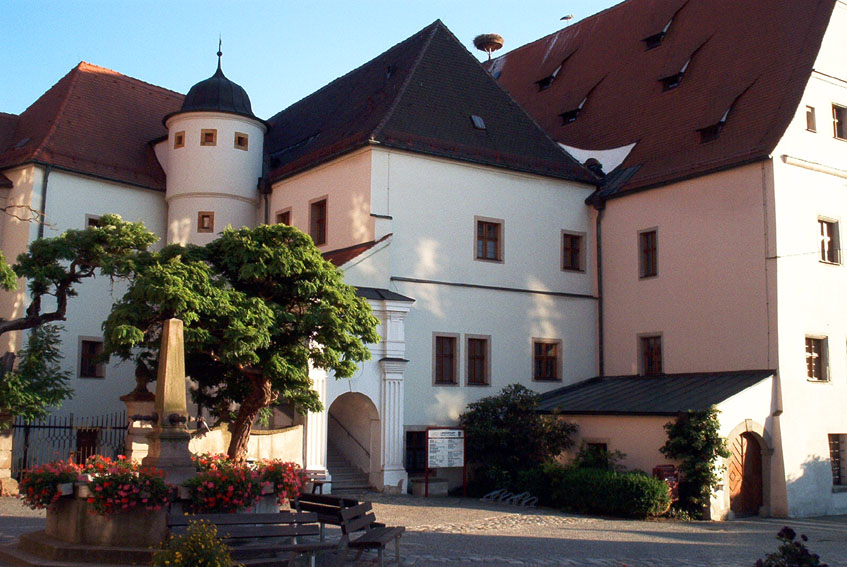
- Old castle

- Coat of arms

- Location of Neustadt a.d.Waldnaab within Neustadt a.d.Waldnaab district
- Interactive map of Neustadt a.d.Waldnaab
- Location within Germany Location within Bavaria
- Coordinates: 49°43′51″N 12°10′15″E
- Country: Germany
- State: Bavaria
- Admin. region: Upper Palatinate
- District: Neustadt a.d.Waldnaab

Government
  - Mayor (2020–26): Sebastian Giering (SPD)

Area
  - Total: 9.93 km^{2} (3.83 sq mi)
- Elevation: 419 m (1,375 ft)

Population (2025-12-31)
  - Total: 5,948
  - Density: 599/km^{2} (1,550/sq mi)
- Time zone: UTC+01:00 (CET)
  - Summer (DST): UTC+02:00 (CEST)
- Postal codes: 92660
- Dialling codes: (+49) 9602
- Vehicle registration: NEW
- Website: www.neustadt-waldnaab.de

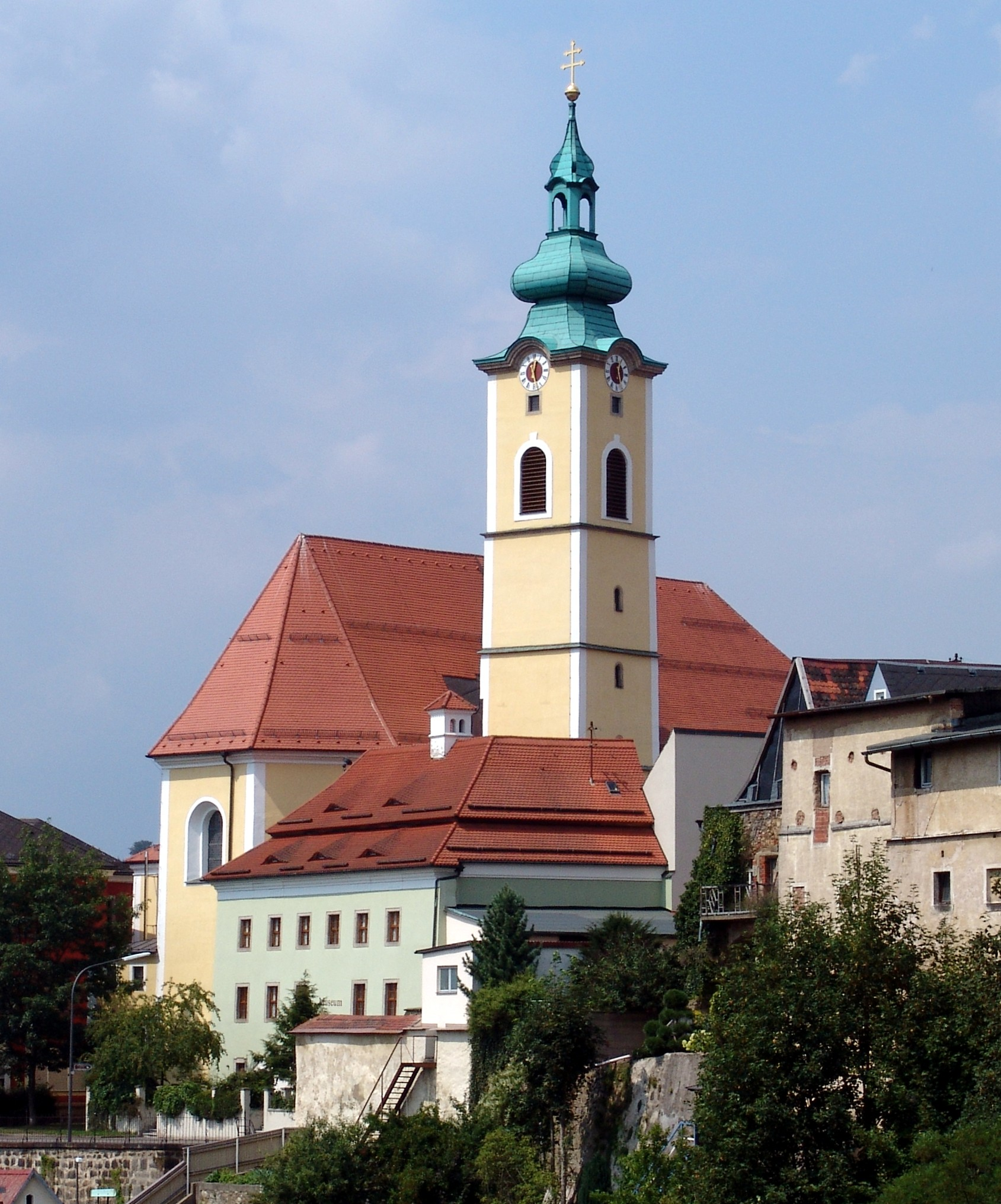
Saint George's church

Neustadt an der Waldnaab (German pronunciation: [ˈnɔʏʃtat ʔan deːɐ̯ ˈvaltˌnaːp]; Bavarian: Neistodt an da Woidnaab; both lit. 'New Town on the Waldnaab', in contrast to "Old Town on the Waldnaab") is a municipality in Bavaria, Germany, and county seat of the district Neustadt an der Waldnaab.

== Sister cities ==
Neustadt an der Waldnaab has one sister city:

- (United States) Hays, Kansas, US
