= Entenbühl =

Mountain in Germany

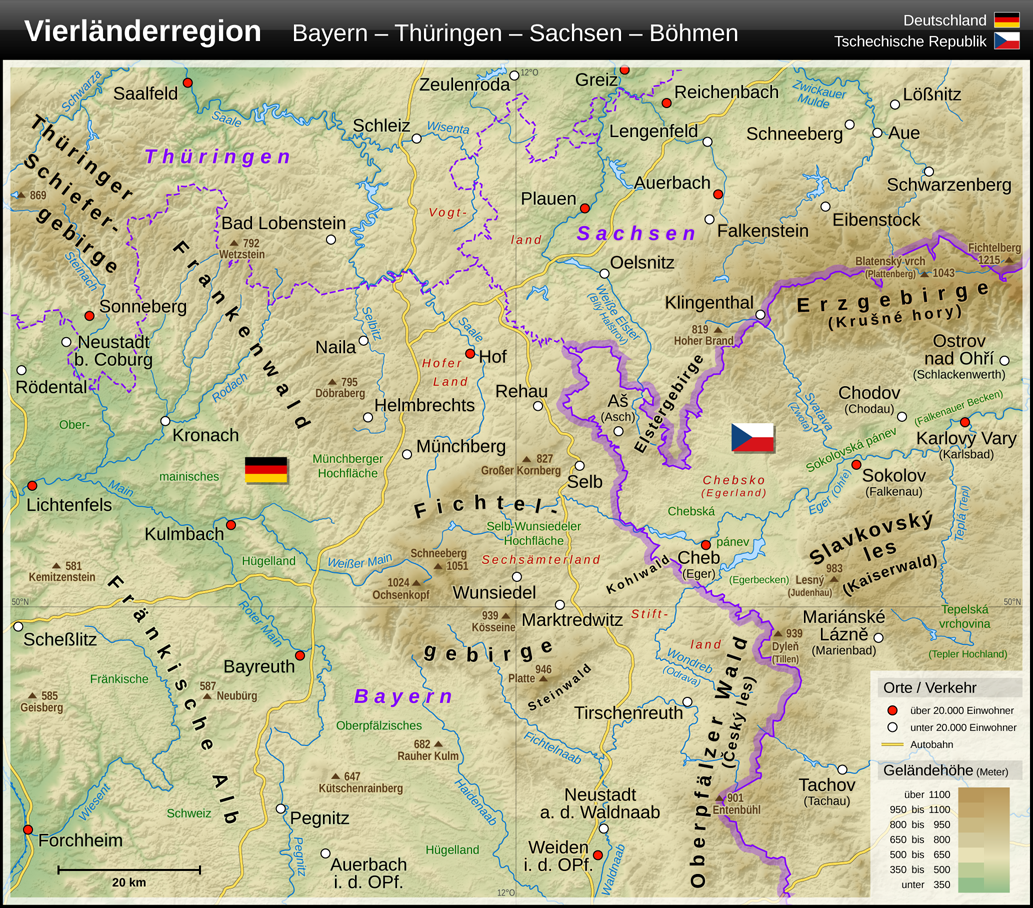

Highest point
- Elevation: 901 m (2,956 ft)
- Coordinates: 49°45′29″N 12°23′55″E

Geography
- Location: Bavaria, Germany

Entenbühl is a mountain of Bavaria, Germany.
