= Altenstadt an der Waldnaab =

Altenstadt a.d.Waldnaab
- Municipality
- Coat of arms

- Location of Altenstadt a.d.Waldnaab within Neustadt a.d.Waldnaab district
- Interactive map of Altenstadt a.d.Waldnaab
- Location within Germany Location within Bavaria
- Coordinates: 49°43′N 12°10′E
- Country: Germany
- State: Bavaria
- Admin. region: Oberpfalz
- District: Neustadt a.d.Waldnaab

Government
  - Mayor (2020–26): Ernst Schicketanz (SPD)

Area
  - Total: 22.06 km^{2} (8.52 sq mi)
- Elevation: 419 m (1,375 ft)

Population (2025-12-31)
  - Total: 4,692
  - Density: 212.7/km^{2} (550.9/sq mi)
- Time zone: UTC+01:00 (CET)
  - Summer (DST): UTC+02:00 (CEST)
- Postal codes: 92665
- Dialling codes: 09602
- Vehicle registration: NEW
- Website: www.altenstadt-waldnaab.de

Altenstadt an der Waldnaab (German pronunciation: [ˈaltn̩ʃtat ʔan deːɐ̯ ˈvaltˌnaːp], lit. 'Old Town on the Waldnaab', in contrast to "New Town on the Waldnaab") is a municipality in the district of Neustadt an der Waldnaab in Bavaria, Germany. It is situated on the river Waldnaab, 2 km (1.2 mi) southeast of Neustadt an der Waldnaab, and 5 km (3.1 mi) north of Weiden in der Oberpfalz. Bundesautobahn 93 (Regensburg - Hof) passes west of Altenstadt. It has a railway station on the Weiden–Oberkotzau railway.

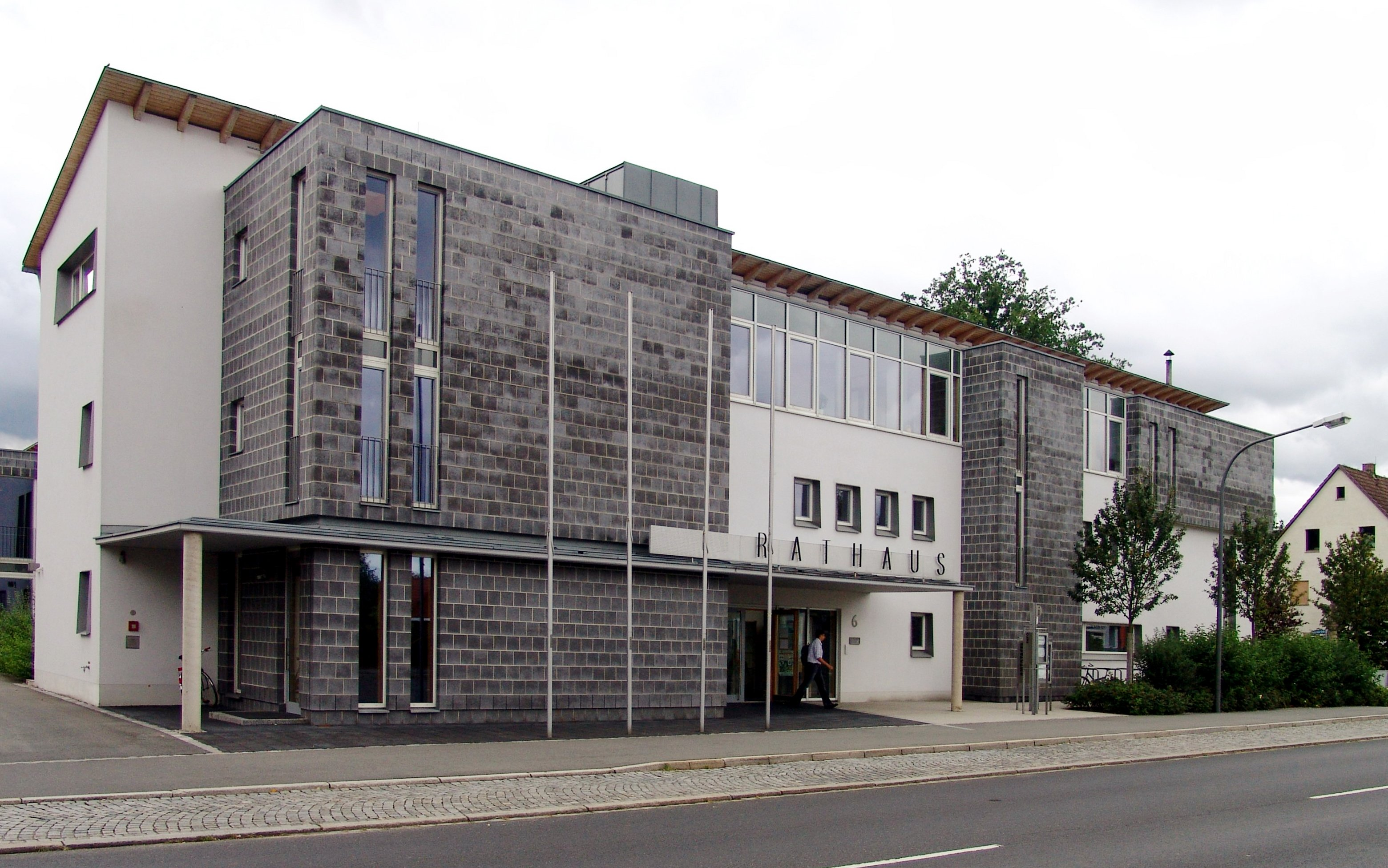
City hall of Altenstadt a.d.WN
