= Luhe-Wildenau =

- Municipality
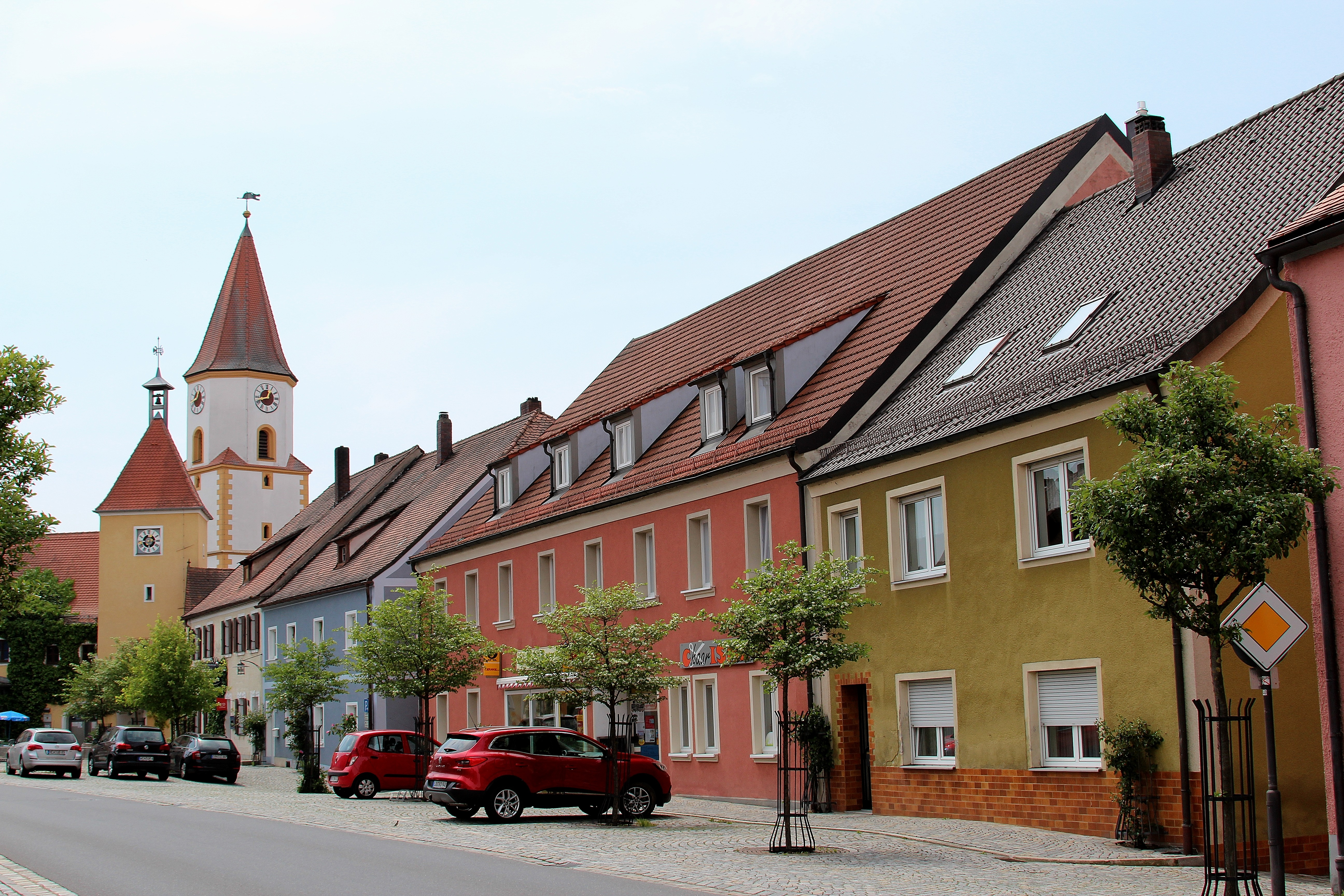

- Coat of arms

- Location of Luhe-Wildenau within Neustadt a.d.Waldnaab district
- Interactive map of Luhe-Wildenau
- Location within Germany Location within Bavaria
- Coordinates: 49°35′2″N 12°9′4″E
- Country: Germany
- State: Bavaria
- Admin. region: Oberpfalz
- District: Neustadt a.d.Waldnaab

Government
  - Mayor (2020–26): Sebastian Hartl

Area
  - Total: 38.66 km^{2} (14.93 sq mi)
- Elevation: 389 m (1,276 ft)

Population (2025-12-31)
  - Total: 3,424
  - Density: 88.57/km^{2} (229.4/sq mi)
- Time zone: UTC+01:00 (CET)
  - Summer (DST): UTC+02:00 (CEST)
- Postal codes: 92706
- Dialling codes: 09607
- Vehicle registration: NEW
- Website: www.luhe-wildenau.de

Luhe-Wildenau (German pronunciation: [ˈluːə ˈvɪldənaʊ]) is a municipality in the district of Neustadt an der Waldnaab in Bavaria, Germany.
