= Naab =

River in Germany

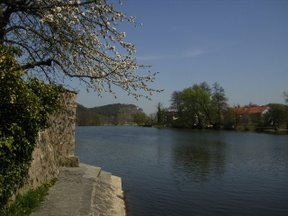
- The Naab near Kallmünz

Location
- Country: Germany
- State: Bavaria

Physical characteristics
- Source
  - location: Fichtel Mountains
- Mouth
  - location: Danube
  - coordinates: 49°1′0″N 12°1′53″E
- Length: 97.5 km (60.6 mi)
- Basin size: 5,514 km^{2} (2,129 sq mi)
- Discharge
  - location: mouth
  - average: 49 m^{3}/s (1,700 cu ft/s)

Basin features
- Progression: Danube→ Black Sea

The Naab (German pronunciation: [naːp]; Czech: Nába) is a river in Bavaria, Germany.

This 97.5 kilometer long river is a left tributary of the Danube. Its average discharge at the mouth is 49 m^{3}/s (1,700 cu ft/s).

The Naab is formed by the confluence of the Waldnaab and the Haidenaab in Luhe-Wildenau, south of Weiden in der Oberpfalz. It flows generally south, through the towns Nabburg, Schwandorf and Burglengenfeld. It flows into the Danube near Regensburg.

== See also ==
- List of rivers of Bavaria

== Sources ==
- Die Naab – mit Waldnaab, Fichtelnaab, Haidenaab. (2004) Luftbildband, 132 pages, Pustet, Regensburg, 2004. ISBN 3-7917-1915-7
- Die Naab – Leben am Fluß im Wandel der Zeit. (1998) Buch & Kunstverlag Oberpfalz, Amberg, ISBN 3-924350-93-0
