= Wiesa =

Wiesa may refer to multiple places:

- Thermalbad Wiesenbad, a municipality named Wiesa until 2005 and containing the town of Wiesa, in the Erzgebirgskreis in the state of Saxony, Germany
- Wiesa (Kamenz), a locality in the district of Bautzen in Saxony, Germany
- Wiesa, a village in Kodersdorf municipality, district of Görlitz, Saxony, Germany
- Wieża, formerly known by its German name Wiesa, a village in Lower Silesian Voivodeship, Poland

== See also ==
- Wiesau (disambiguation), a placename used in both Germany and Poland
- Wiesaz, a river in Baden-Württemberg, Germany
- Wies (disambiguation), a placename used in Germany and Austria
