= Wiesau (river) =

River in Germany

Location
- Country: Germany
- State: Bavaria

Physical characteristics
- Mouth
  - location: Waldnaab
  - coordinates: 49.8802°N 12.2480°E
- Length: 14.6 km (9.1 mi)

Basin features
- Progression: Waldnaab→ Naab→ Danube→ Black Sea

Wiesau is a river of Bavaria, Germany. It passes through the town Wiesau and flows into the Waldnaab near Falkenberg.

== See also ==
- List of rivers of Bavaria
