= Wiesau (disambiguation) =

Wiesau is a municipality in Bavaria, Germany.

Wiesau may also refer to:

- Wiesau (river), a river of Bavaria, Germany
- Radwanice, Polkowice County, a village in Poland, (German name Wiesau)
- Łączna, Kłodzko County, a village in Poland, (German name Wiesau)
- Wymiarki, Lubusz Voivodeship, a village in western Poland, formerly Prussia (German name Wiesau)
