= Aloys Grillmeier =

German Jesuit priest and theologian

His Eminence Aloys Grillmeier SJ
- Cardinal Deacon of San Nicola in Carcere
- Installed: 26 November 1994
- Term ended: 13 September 1998
- Predecessor: Patrick O'Boyle
- Successor: Zenon Grocholewski

Orders
- Ordination: 24 June 1934
- Created cardinal: 26 November 1994
- Rank: Cardinal Deacon

Personal details
- Born: 1 January 1910 Pechbrunn, Kingdom of Bavaria, German Empire
- Died: 13 September 1998 (aged 88) Unterhaching, Bavaria, Germany
- Buried: Pullach im Isartal, Bavaria, Germany
- Profession: Theologian

Aloys Grillmeier SJ (1 January 1910 – 13 September 1998) was a German Jesuit priest, theologian and cardinal-deacon of the Catholic Church. Pope John Paul II created him cardinal-deacon of San Nicola in Carcere on 26 November 1994.

== Life ==
Aloys (in German: Alois) Grillmeier was born in Pechbrunn in the Kingdom of Bavaria in 1910 to Joseph Grillmeier and Maria Weidner. He entered the Jesuit Order in April 1929 after completing grammar school in Regensburg. He studied philosophy in Munich and theology in Valkenburg in the Netherlands. He was ordained priest on 24 June 1937 in the middle of further theological studies in Frankfurt am Main. After studying in Rome, he gained his doctorate in February 1942 from the University of Freiburg.

Two days after the graduation ceremony Grillmeier was conscripted into the German army and trained as a medical orderly in Ulm. He was then sent to the Eastern Front where he treated the casualties of the bitter fighting against Soviet forces. He was released from further military service in April 1944 as a member of the Jesuits. Grillmeier then began a long teaching career in fundamental and dogmatic theology, most of which was spent as Professor of Dogmatics at the Sankt Georgen Graduate School of Philosophy and Theology (Frankfurt am Main), where the German Jesuits received their theological education.

Grillmeier became known at the Second Vatican Council, where he acted as theological adviser to Bishop Wilhelm Kempf of Limburg. From 1963 to 1965 he was also on the theology commission of the Council itself. He had a particular input into the drafting of the document Lumen gentium, the Dogmatic Constitution on the Church. It was here that he first met Cardinal Wojtyła and worked with him in writing various works, papers and documents including "Gaudium et spes", "Lumen gentium", "Dei verbum" and "Dignitatis humanae". He retired in 1978 on his 68th birthday, but continued to write and lecture.

Grillmeier died on 13 September 1998 in Unterhaching, Bavaria, Germany.

== Legacy ==
Grillmeier was committed to ecumenism. In the 1970s he became an adviser to the Pro Oriente Institute in Vienna, which promoted contact with other Christian Churches, especially in the East, and he took part in several unofficial theological dialogues with the Oriental Orthodox Churches and was a member of the official dialogue commission Coptic Orthodox – Roman Catholic.

== Bibliography ==
Grillmeier's written output – 12 major books and several hundred academic articles – is a part of his legacy. His magnum opus "Christ in Christian Tradition" looked at the development of Christology from early Christian times to the ninth century, drawing particularly on the traditions of the Eastern Christian Church. Volume one was published in 1965 (with a revised version in 1975) and volume two in 1987. In a rare event, the work was published in English before the original German. Grillmeier published expanded versions of the second volume in the 1990s in collaboration with Theresia Hainthaler.

=== Books ===
- English editions: Christ in Christian Tradition, Volume 1:
  - Grillmeier, Aloys (1965). Christ in Christian Tradition: From the Apostolic Age to Chalcedon (451). Vol. 1 (1st ed.). London: Mowbray.
  - Grillmeier, Aloys (1975) [1965]. Christ in Christian Tradition: From the Apostolic Age to Chalcedon (451). Vol. 1 (2nd revised ed.). Atlanta: John Knox Press. ISBN 9780664223014.
- Volume 2, From the Council of Chalcedon (451) to Gregory the Great (590-604):
  - Grillmeier, Aloys (1987). Christ in Christian Tradition: Reception and Contradiction: The Development of the Discussion about Chalcedon from 451 to the Beginning of the reign of Justinian. Vol. 2/1. Atlanta: John Knox Press. ISBN 9780664221607.
  - Grillmeier, Aloys; Hainthaler, Theresia (1995). Christ in Christian Tradition: The Church of Constantinople in the Sixth Century. Vol. 2/2. Louisville: Westminster John Knox Press. ISBN 9780664219970.
  - Grillmeier, Aloys; Hainthaler, Theresia (2013). Christ in Christian Tradition: The Churches of Jerusalem and Antioch from 451 to 600. Vol. 2/3. Oxford: Oxford University Press. ISBN 9780199212880.
  - Grillmeier, Aloys; Hainthaler, Theresia (1996). Christ in Christian Tradition: The Church of Alexandria with Nubia and Ethiopia after 451. Vol. 2/4. Louisville: Westminster John Knox Press. ISBN 9780664223007.

== Sources ==
- Obituary on Aloys Grillmeier, in "The Independent" https://www.independent.co.uk/arts-entertainment/obituary-cardinal-alois-grillmeier-1176420.html
- College of Cardinal Collection
- Catholic Hierarchy.com: "Aloys Grillmeier"
- Bibliography of Aloys Grillmeier
