= Waldeck Castle (Upper Palatinate) =

Coordinates: 49.8582°N 11.9478°E

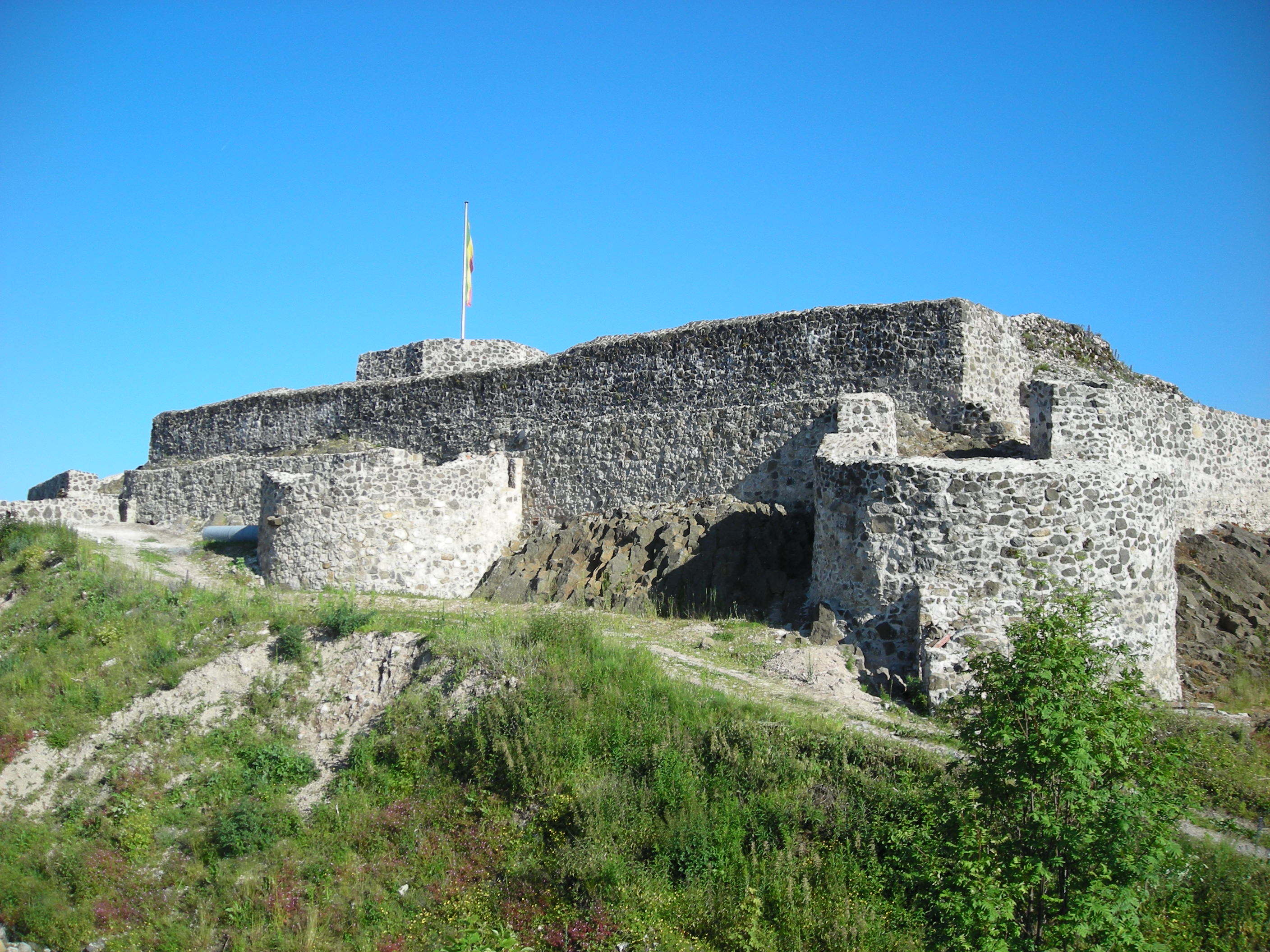
Waldeck Castle from the north

The ruins of Waldeck Castle (German: Burg Waldeck) are in the Upper Palatinate region of the state of Bavaria in Germany, on a hill overlooking the village of Waldeck, near Kemnath.

== History ==
The castle in Waldeck was first built in the 12th century by Gebhardus der Waldegge the Landgrave of Leuchtenberg.
