= Kulmain =

- Municipality
- Coat of arms

- Location of Kulmain within Tirschenreuth district
- Interactive map of Kulmain
- Location within Germany Location within Bavaria
- Coordinates: 49°53′N 11°54′E
- Country: Germany
- State: Bavaria
- Admin. region: Oberpfalz
- District: Tirschenreuth
- Subdivisions: 19 Ortsteile

Government
  - Mayor (2020–26): Günter Kopp (CSU)

Area
  - Total: 32.29 km^{2} (12.47 sq mi)
- Elevation: 485 m (1,591 ft)

Population (2025-12-31)
  - Total: 2,207
  - Density: 68.35/km^{2} (177.0/sq mi)
- Time zone: UTC+01:00 (CET)
  - Summer (DST): UTC+02:00 (CEST)
- Postal codes: 95508
- Dialling codes: 09642
- Vehicle registration: TIR
- Website: www.kulmain.de

Kulmain is a municipality in the district of Tirschenreuth located north of Kemnath in Bavaria in Germany.
