= Immenreuth =

- Municipality
- Coat of arms

- Location of Immenreuth within Tirschenreuth district
- Interactive map of Immenreuth
- Location within Germany Location within Bavaria
- Coordinates: 49°53′N 11°52′E
- Country: Germany
- State: Bavaria
- Admin. region: Oberpfalz
- District: Tirschenreuth
- Subdivisions: 17 Ortsteile

Government
  - Mayor (2020–26): Thomas Kaufmann

Area
  - Total: 18.05 km^{2} (6.97 sq mi)
- Elevation: 504 m (1,654 ft)

Population (2025-12-31)
  - Total: 1,941
  - Density: 107.5/km^{2} (278.5/sq mi)
- Time zone: UTC+01:00 (CET)
  - Summer (DST): UTC+02:00 (CEST)
- Postal codes: 95505
- Dialling codes: 09642
- Vehicle registration: TIR
- Website: www.immenreuth.de

Immenreuth is a municipality in the district of Tirschenreuth in Bavaria, Germany.
