= Kastl, Tirschenreuth =

Kastl
- Municipality
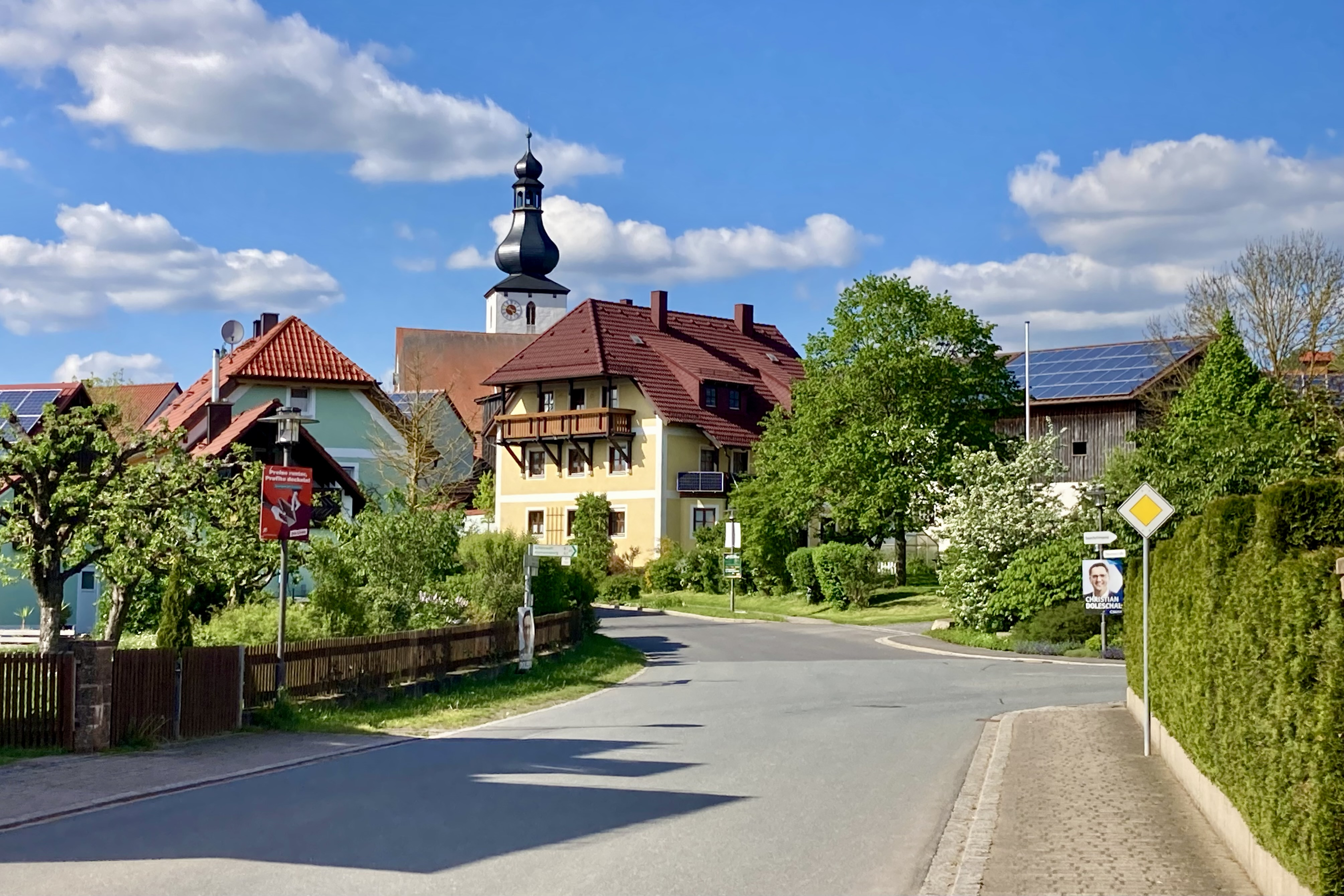
- Kastl, (Tirschenreuth), Germany

- Coat of arms

- Location of Kastl within Tirschenreuth district
- Interactive map of Kastl
- Location within Germany Location within Bavaria
- Coordinates: 49°49′N 11°54′E
- Country: Germany
- State: Bavaria
- Admin. region: Oberpfalz
- District: Tirschenreuth
- Municipal assoc.: Kemnath
- Subdivisions: 13 Ortsteile

Government
  - Mayor (2020–26): Hans Walter (CSU)

Area
  - Total: 24.74 km^{2} (9.55 sq mi)
- Elevation: 460 m (1,510 ft)

Population (2025-12-31)
  - Total: 1,468
  - Density: 59.34/km^{2} (153.7/sq mi)
- Time zone: UTC+01:00 (CET)
  - Summer (DST): UTC+02:00 (CEST)
- Postal codes: 95506
- Dialling codes: 09642
- Vehicle registration: TIR
- Website: www.kastl-kem.de

Kastl (German pronunciation: [ˈkastl̩]) is a municipality in the district of Tirschenreuth in Bavaria, Germany.
