= Mitterteich =

- Town
- Coat of arms

- Location of Mitterteich within Tirschenreuth district
- Interactive map of Mitterteich
- Location within Germany Location within Bavaria
- Coordinates: 49°56′N 12°14′E
- Country: Germany
- State: Bavaria
- Admin. region: Oberpfalz
- District: Tirschenreuth
- Municipal assoc.: Mitterteich
- Subdivisions: 8 Ortsteile

Government
  - Mayor (2020–26): Stefan Grillmeier (CSU)

Area
  - Total: 39.38 km^{2} (15.20 sq mi)
- Elevation: 502–632 m (1,647–2,073 ft)

Population (2025-12-31)
  - Total: 6,557
  - Density: 166.5/km^{2} (431.2/sq mi)
- Time zone: UTC+01:00 (CET)
  - Summer (DST): UTC+02:00 (CEST)
- Postal codes: 95666
- Dialling codes: 09633
- Vehicle registration: TIR
- Website: www.mitterteich.de

Mitterteich (German pronunciation: [ˈmɪtɐˌtaɪç]; Northern Bavarian: Miederdeich) is a municipality in the district of Tirschenreuth, in Bavaria, Germany. It is situated 10 km northwest of Tirschenreuth, and 17 km southwest of Cheb.

== Notable people ==
- Theobald Schrems (1893 – 1963), music educator and organist
- Heiner Hopfner (1941 – 2014), tenor

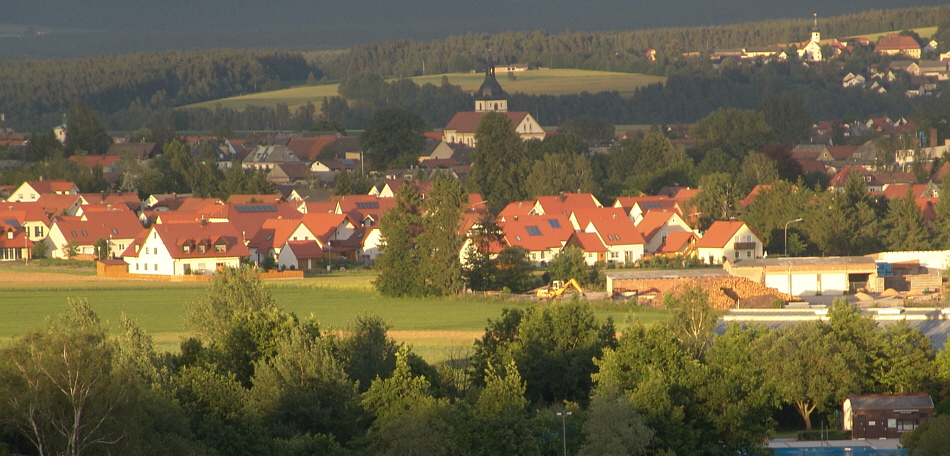

== See also ==
- Schott AG, a producer of glass tubing in Mitterteich
