= Neusorg (Verwaltungsgemeinschaft) =

- Verwaltungsgemeinschaft
- Location of Neusorg within Tirschenreuth district
- Interactive map of Neusorg
- Location within Germany Location within Bavaria
- Coordinates: 49°56′N 11°58′E
- Country: Germany
- State: Bavaria
- Admin. region: Upper Palatinate
- District: Tirschenreuth
- Seat: Neusorg
- Subdivisions: 4 municipalities

Area
  - Total: 82.36 km^{2} (31.80 sq mi)

Population (2025-12-31)
  - Total: 5,920
  - Density: 71.9/km^{2} (186/sq mi)
- Time zone: UTC+01:00 (CET)
  - Summer (DST): UTC+02:00 (CEST)
- Website: www.vgem-neusorg.de

Neusorg is a Verwaltungsgemeinschaft (municipal association) in the district of Tirschenreuth in Bavaria, Germany. Its seat is in Neusorg.

It consists of the following municipalities:

1. Brand
2. Ebnath
3. Neusorg
4. Pullenreuth
