= Pullenreuth =

- Municipality
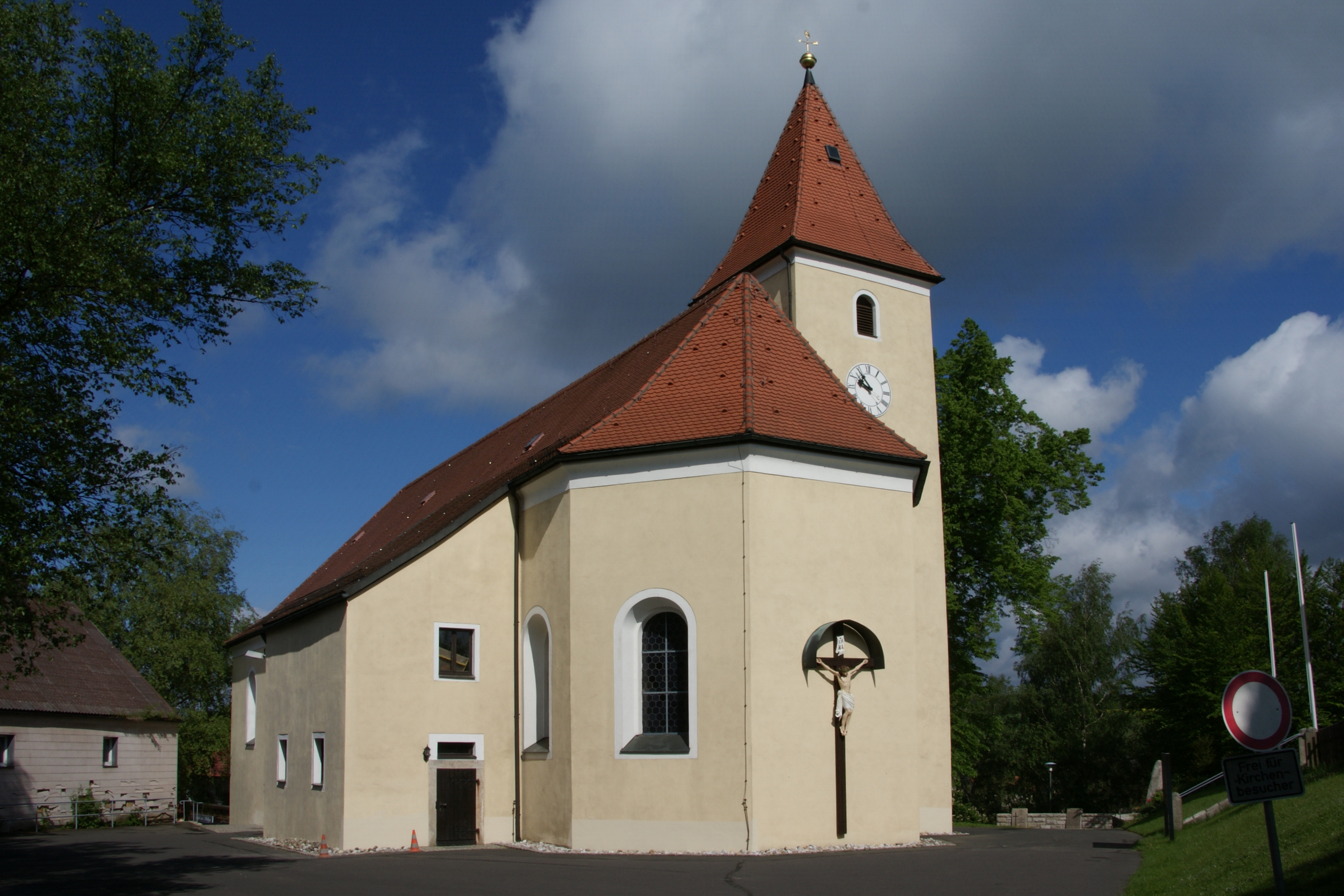
- Church of Saint Martin

- Coat of arms

- Location of Pullenreuth within Tirschenreuth district
- Interactive map of Pullenreuth
- Location within Germany Location within Bavaria
- Coordinates: 49°55′N 12°0′E
- Country: Germany
- State: Bavaria
- Admin. region: Oberpfalz
- District: Tirschenreuth
- Municipal assoc.: Neusorg
- Subdivisions: 4 Ortsteile

Government
  - Mayor (2020–26): Hubert Kraus (CSU)

Area
  - Total: 43.16 km^{2} (16.66 sq mi)
- Elevation: 542 m (1,778 ft)

Population (2025-12-31)
  - Total: 1,543
  - Density: 35.75/km^{2} (92.59/sq mi)
- Time zone: UTC+01:00 (CET)
  - Summer (DST): UTC+02:00 (CEST)
- Postal codes: 95704
- Dialling codes: 09234
- Vehicle registration: TIR
- Website: www.pullenreuth.de

Pullenreuth is a municipality in the district of Tirschenreuth in Bavaria, Germany.

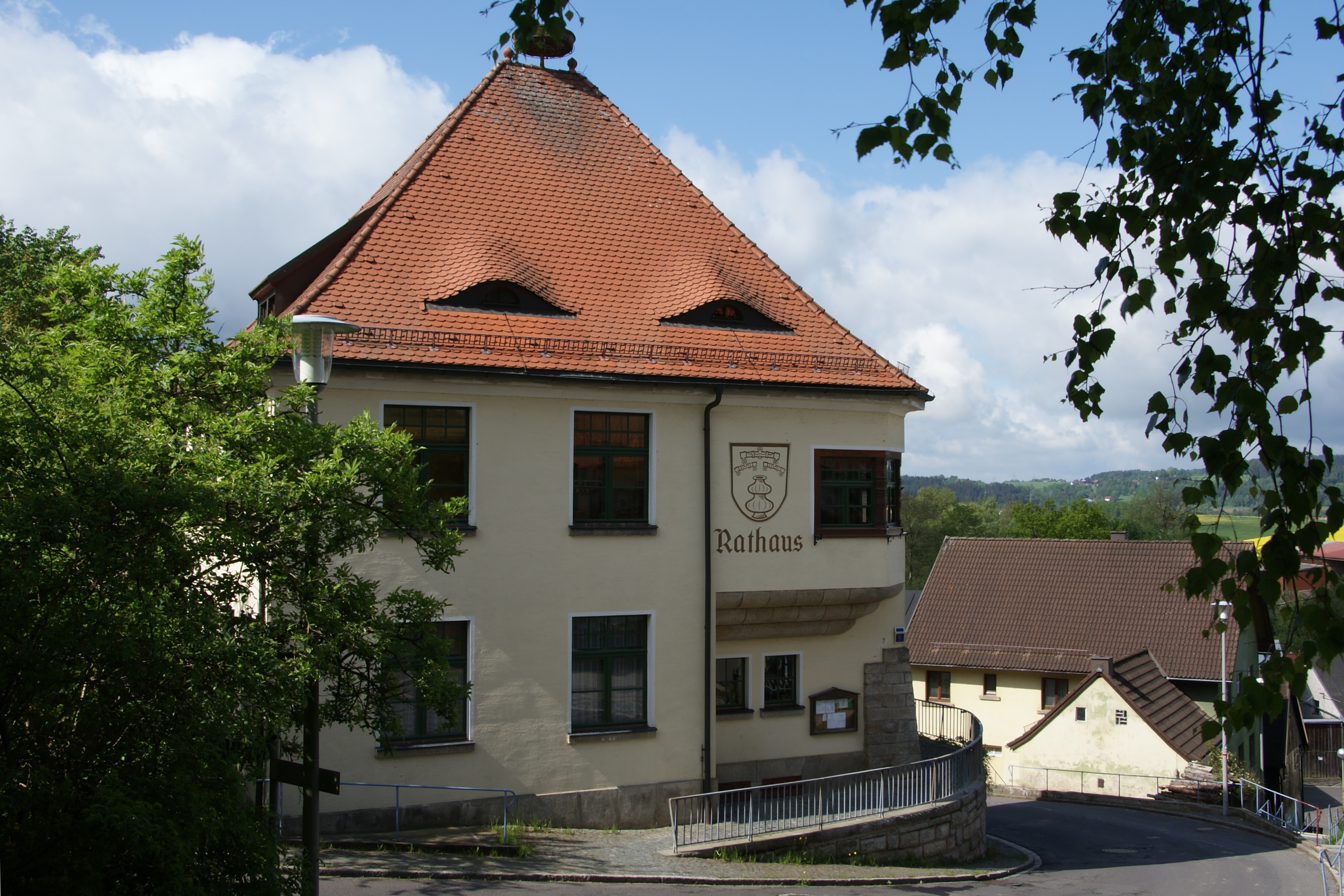
Town hall
