= Brand, Bavaria =

Brand
- Municipality
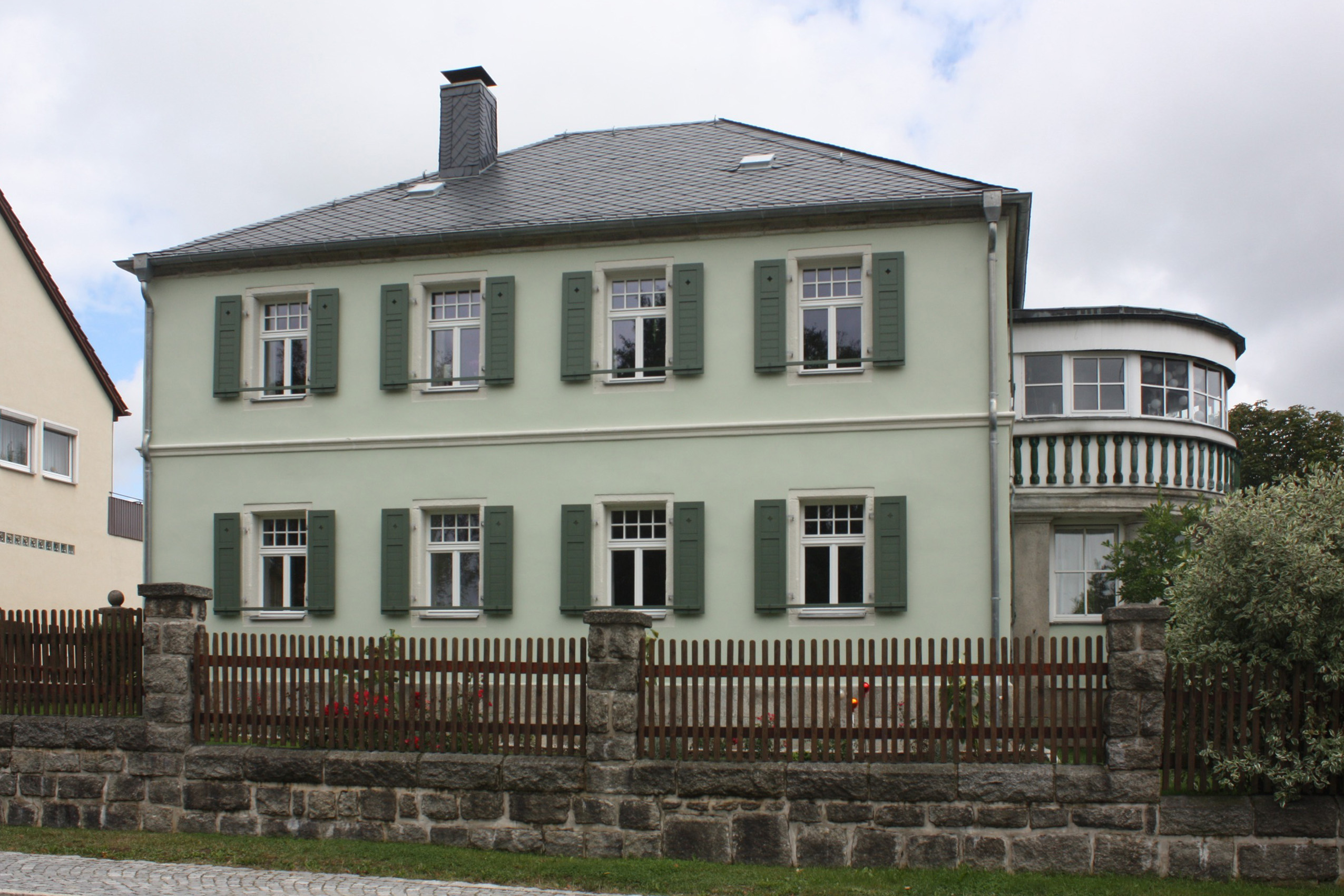
- Birthplace of the composer Max Reger

- Coat of arms

- Location of Brand within Tirschenreuth district
- Interactive map of Brand
- Location within Germany Location within Bavaria
- Coordinates: 49°57′N 11°54′E
- Country: Germany
- State: Bavaria
- Admin. region: Oberpfalz
- District: Tirschenreuth
- Municipal assoc.: Neusorg
- Subdivisions: 7 Ortsteile

Government
  - Mayor (2020–26): Bernhard Schindler (CSU)

Area
  - Total: 9.48 km^{2} (3.66 sq mi)
- Elevation: 583 m (1,913 ft)

Population (2025-12-31)
  - Total: 1,136
  - Density: 120/km^{2} (310/sq mi)
- Time zone: UTC+01:00 (CET)
  - Summer (DST): UTC+02:00 (CEST)
- Postal codes: 95682
- Dialling codes: 09236
- Vehicle registration: TIR
- Website: www.gemeinde-brand.de

Brand is a municipality in the district of Tirschenreuth in Bavaria, Germany. It is notable for being the headquarters of the luxury car modification company Mansory.

== Notable people ==
- Max Reger (1873–1916), composer, pianist and conductor
