= Wiesau (Verwaltungsgemeinschaft) =

- Verwaltungsgemeinschaft
- Location of Wiesau within Tirschenreuth district
- Interactive map of Wiesau
- Location within Germany Location within Bavaria
- Coordinates: 49°54′N 12°11′E
- Country: Germany
- State: Bavaria
- Admin. region: Upper Palatinate
- District: Tirschenreuth
- Seat: Wiesau
- Subdivisions: 2 municipalities

Area
  - Total: 81.97 km^{2} (31.65 sq mi)

Population (2025-12-31)
  - Total: 4,741
  - Density: 57.84/km^{2} (149.8/sq mi)
- Time zone: UTC+01:00 (CET)
  - Summer (DST): UTC+02:00 (CEST)
- Website: www.vg-wiesau.de

Wiesau is a Verwaltungsgemeinschaft (municipal association) in the district of Tirschenreuth in Bavaria, Germany. Its seat is in Wiesau.

It consists of the following municipalities:

1. Falkenberg
2. Wiesau
