= Reuth bei Erbendorf =

- Municipality
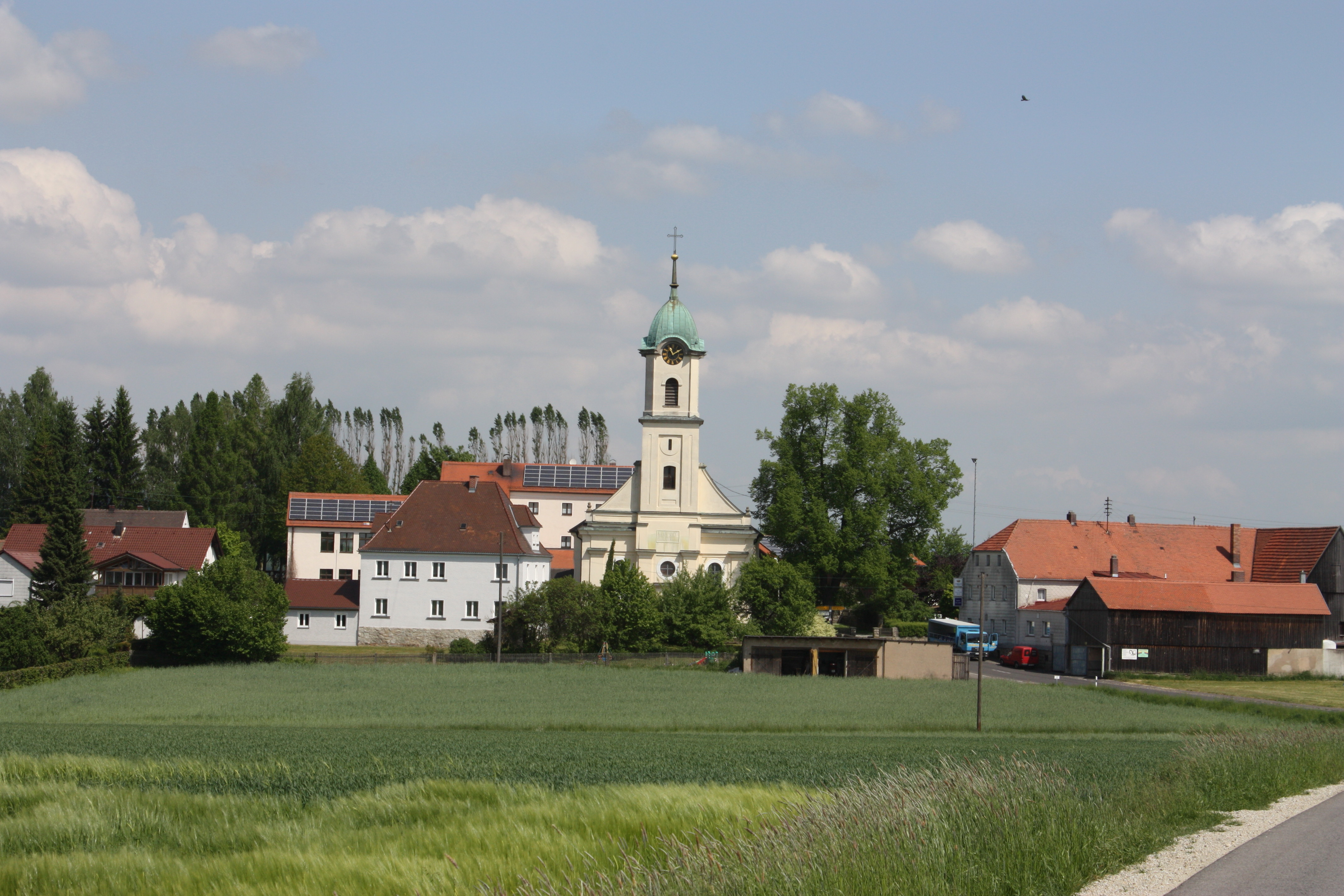
- Reuth bei Erbendorf

- Coat of arms

- Location of Reuth bei Erbendorf within Tirschenreuth district
- Interactive map of Reuth bei Erbendorf
- Location within Germany Location within Bavaria
- Coordinates: 49°51′N 12°7′E
- Country: Germany
- State: Bavaria
- Admin. region: Oberpfalz
- District: Tirschenreuth
- Municipal assoc.: Krummennaab
- Subdivisions: 15 Ortsteile

Government
  - Mayor (2020–26): Werner Prucker (FW)

Area
  - Total: 16.91 km^{2} (6.53 sq mi)
- Elevation: 476 m (1,562 ft)

Population (2025-12-31)
  - Total: 1,109
  - Density: 65.58/km^{2} (169.9/sq mi)
- Time zone: UTC+01:00 (CET)
  - Summer (DST): UTC+02:00 (CEST)
- Postal codes: 92717
- Dialling codes: 09681, 09682, 09683
- Vehicle registration: TIR
- Website: https://www.reuth-b-erb.de/

Reuth bei Erbendorf is a municipality in the district of Tirschenreuth in Bavaria, Germany.
