= Kemnath (Verwaltungsgemeinschaft) =

- Verwaltungsgemeinschaft
- Location of Kemnath within Tirschenreuth district
- Interactive map of Kemnath
- Location within Germany Location within Bavaria
- Coordinates: 49°52′N 11°53′E
- Country: Germany
- State: Bavaria
- Admin. region: Upper Palatinate
- District: Tirschenreuth
- Seat: Kemnath
- Subdivisions: 2 municipalities

Area
  - Total: 81.53 km^{2} (31.48 sq mi)

Population (2025-12-31)
  - Total: 7,361
  - Density: 90.29/km^{2} (233.8/sq mi)
- Time zone: UTC+01:00 (CET)
  - Summer (DST): UTC+02:00 (CEST)
- Website: www.kemnath.de

Kemnath is a Verwaltungsgemeinschaft (municipal association) in the district of Tirschenreuth in Bavaria, Germany. Its seat is in Kemnath.

It consists of the following municipalities:

1. Kastl
2. Kemnath
