= Ebnath =

- Municipality
- Coat of arms

- Location of Ebnath within Tirschenreuth district
- Interactive map of Ebnath
- Location within Germany Location within Bavaria
- Coordinates: 49°57′N 11°55′E
- Country: Germany
- State: Bavaria
- Admin. region: Oberpfalz
- District: Tirschenreuth
- Municipal assoc.: Neusorg
- Subdivisions: 7 Ortsteile

Government
  - Mayor (2020–26): Wolfgang Söllner (CSU)

Area
  - Total: 11.03 km^{2} (4.26 sq mi)
- Elevation: 537 m (1,762 ft)

Population (2025-12-31)
  - Total: 1,289
  - Density: 116.9/km^{2} (302.7/sq mi)
- Time zone: UTC+01:00 (CET)
  - Summer (DST): UTC+02:00 (CEST)
- Postal codes: 95683
- Dialling codes: 09234
- Vehicle registration: TIR
- Website: www.ebnath.de

Ebnath is a municipality in the district of Tirschenreuth in Bavaria, Germany.
