= Leonberg, Bavaria =

Leonberg
- Municipality
- Coat of arms

- Location of Leonberg within Tirschenreuth district
- Interactive map of Leonberg
- Location within Germany Location within Bavaria
- Coordinates: 49°57′N 12°17′E
- Country: Germany
- State: Bavaria
- Admin. region: Oberpfalz
- District: Tirschenreuth
- Municipal assoc.: Mitterteich

Government
  - Mayor (2020–26): Johann Burger

Area
  - Total: 51.33 km^{2} (19.82 sq mi)
- Elevation: 548 m (1,798 ft)

Population (2025-12-31)
  - Total: 1,054
  - Density: 20.53/km^{2} (53.18/sq mi)
- Time zone: UTC+01:00 (CET)
  - Summer (DST): UTC+02:00 (CEST)
- Postal codes: 95666
- Dialling codes: 09633
- Vehicle registration: TIR
- Website: www.leonberg.mitterteich.de

Leonberg is a municipality in the district of Tirschenreuth in Bavaria, Germany.
