= Mitterteich (Verwaltungsgemeinschaft) =

- Verwaltungsgemeinschaft
- Location of Mitterteich within Tirschenreuth district
- Interactive map of Mitterteich
- Location within Germany Location within Bavaria
- Coordinates: 49°57′N 12°15′E
- Country: Germany
- State: Bavaria
- Admin. region: Upper Palatinate
- District: Tirschenreuth
- Seat: Mitterteich
- Subdivisions: 3 municipalities

Area
  - Total: 117.18 km^{2} (45.24 sq mi)

Population (2025-12-31)
  - Total: 8,893
  - Density: 75.89/km^{2} (196.6/sq mi)
- Time zone: UTC+01:00 (CET)
  - Summer (DST): UTC+02:00 (CEST)
- Website: www.mitterteich.de

Mitterteich is a Verwaltungsgemeinschaft (municipal association) in the district of Tirschenreuth in Bavaria, Germany. Its seat is in Mitterteich.

It consists of the following municipalities:

1. Leonberg
2. Mitterteich
3. Pechbrunn
