= Fuchsmühl =

- Municipality
- Coat of arms

- Location of Fuchsmühl within Tirschenreuth district
- Interactive map of Fuchsmühl
- Location within Germany Location within Bavaria
- Coordinates: 49°55′N 12°9′E
- Country: Germany
- State: Bavaria
- Admin. region: Oberpfalz
- District: Tirschenreuth

Government
  - Mayor (2020–26): Wolfgang Braun (CSU)

Area
  - Total: 14.84 km^{2} (5.73 sq mi)
- Elevation: 624 m (2,047 ft)

Population (2025-12-31)
  - Total: 1,529
  - Density: 103.0/km^{2} (266.9/sq mi)
- Time zone: UTC+01:00 (CET)
  - Summer (DST): UTC+02:00 (CEST)
- Postal codes: 95689
- Dialling codes: 09634
- Vehicle registration: TIR
- Website: www.fuchsmuehl.de

Fuchsmühl is a municipality in the district of Tirschenreuth in Bavaria, Germany.
