= Heiner Hopfner =

German singer

Heiner Hopfner (28 June 1941 in Mitterteich – 31 August 2014) was a German opera, lied and concert singer as well as a singing teacher in the tenor vocal range.

== Career ==
At the age of eight, Heiner Hopfner joined the Regensburger Domspatzen. After graduating from high school in 1962 at the Deutschen Gymnasium in Amberg, he studied singing at the Musikhochschule München and pedagogy at LMU Munich. During his three-year traineeship he won several international prizes and devoted himself increasingly to his career as an opera, lieder and concert singer. Afterwards, he sang on the big German-speaking music stages, among others at the Bayerische Staatsoper, and many song and concert evenings led him to the big national and international concert halls. In the late 1970s he was the leading tenor of the Staatstheater Kassel.

The singer has worked with conductors such as Eugen Jochum, Herbert von Karajan, Karl Böhm, Karl Richter, Helmuth Rilling, Georg Solti and Wolfgang Sawallisch to name but a few.

Heiner Hopfner taught singing at the Mozarteum in Salzburg. His students included, Christiane Karg Joel Montero, Cordula Schuster, etc. He was also a jury member of the International Mozart Competition.

Heiner Hopfner died on 31 August 2014 at the age of 73.

== Discography (selection) ==
- J. S. Bach, Weihnachtsoratorium, Label: Archiv 2723057
- Kantaten und Lieder zur Weihnacht, Label: Christophorus Entrée 1994
- Der Vampir, Label: Opera d'Oro 2005
- Karl Ditter von Dittersdorf, Label: Ars Nusici 2009
