= Friedenfels =

- Municipality
- Coat of arms

- Location of Friedenfels within Tirschenreuth district
- Interactive map of Friedenfels
- Location within Germany Location within Bavaria
- Coordinates: 49°52′N 12°07′E
- Country: Germany
- State: Bavaria
- Admin. region: Oberpfalz
- District: Tirschenreuth
- Subdivisions: 12 Ortsteile

Government
  - Mayor (2020–26): Oskar Schuster

Area
  - Total: 16.28 km^{2} (6.29 sq mi)
- Elevation: 537 m (1,762 ft)

Population (2025-12-31)
  - Total: 1,176
  - Density: 72.24/km^{2} (187.1/sq mi)
- Time zone: UTC+01:00 (CET)
  - Summer (DST): UTC+02:00 (CEST)
- Postal codes: 95688
- Dialling codes: 09683
- Vehicle registration: TIR
- Website: www.friedenfels.de

Friedenfels is a municipality in the district of Tirschenreuth in Bavaria, Germany.
