= Mansory =

Iranian luxury vehicle modification company

MANSORY Design & Holding GmbH
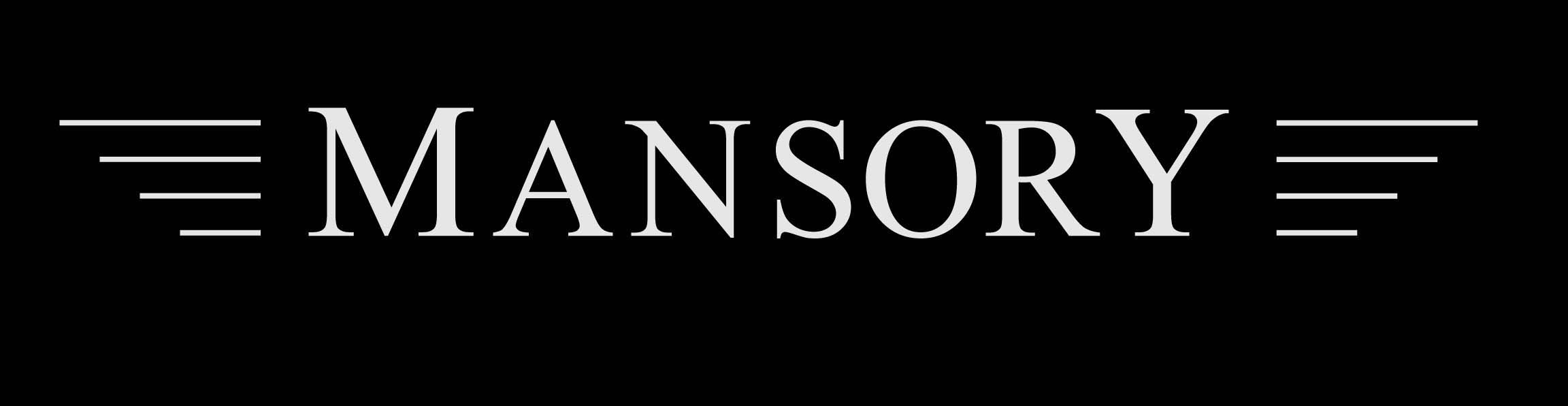
- Type: Private
- Industry: Automotive
- Founded: 1989; 37 years ago
- Headquarters: Brand, Bavaria, Germany
- Key people: Kourosh Mansory, Founder/CEO
- Products: Luxury Automobiles
- Number of employees: 182
- Website: www.mansory.com

Mansory is a luxury car modification firm based in Brand, Bavaria, Germany. Founded in 1989, the company specialises in adding custom-designed body kits and performance tuning to luxury vehicles. Besides luxury cars, they also work on supercars, SUVs, custom bikes, and golf carts. Mansory works on vehicles from a number of manufacturers, including Aston Martin, Audi, Bentley, BMW, Bugatti, Ferrari, Lamborghini, Lotus, Maserati, Mercedes-Benz, Rolls-Royce, and Tesla.

== History ==
Mansory was founded in 1989 by Iranian tuner Kourosh Mansory. His then Munich-based workshop focused on modifications for British car brands such as Rolls-Royce and Italian brands such as Ferrari. By mid-2001, the company had grown out of its Munich workshop and moved to its headquarters in the Fichtel Mountains. The company currently operates out of a workshop in Brand, Germany.

In November 2007, Mansory acquired the Porsche-tuning arm of Rinspeed AG. Rinspeed maintains its Swiss base in Zumikon at Lake Zurich. Currently, Mansory employs 182 members of staff worldwide and has a global dealership network.

As of 2012, Mansory's worldwide distribution network includes dealerships in Germany, United Kingdom, India, China, Canada, Poland, Russia, United States, Japan, Greece, Switzerland, Iceland, the UAE and a few other countries.

== Partnerships and collaborations ==
=== Garia Mansory Edition ===
At the 2011 Frankfurt Motor Show, Mansory announced a commercial agreement with golf cart manufacturer Garia. The company produced a series of special edition golf and leisure cars for wealthy clients. These cars featured carbon fibre body panels on the front, side steps and tail and elements of teak decking.

=== Collaboration with Lotus ===
In 2012, Mansory signed an agreement with Lotus Group, then under the control of CEO Dany Bahar. Under the agreement, Mansory would provide its services to Lotus customers who would require bodywork, trim and special finishes for the Lotus Elise, Exige and Evora models. The partnership developed following a series of one-off models produced by Mansory for Lotus including the Evora Concept Bespoke unveiled at the 2011 Geneva Motor Show. The partnership fell through shortly afterwards when Dany Bahar was removed as CEO of Lotus Group. In March 2019 Mansory released the GTE Final Edition at the Geneva Motor Show 2019, based on the Evora.

=== Mansory Marine ===
In 2024, Mansory announced the Pirelli 42 and Pirelli 50 rigid inflatable boats. Both boats use 600 hp Mercury Engines. The Pirelli RIB's have been showcased and revealed to the public at the 2024 Cannes Boat Show and the 2024 Genoa Boat Show.

== Gallery ==
Mansory vehicles

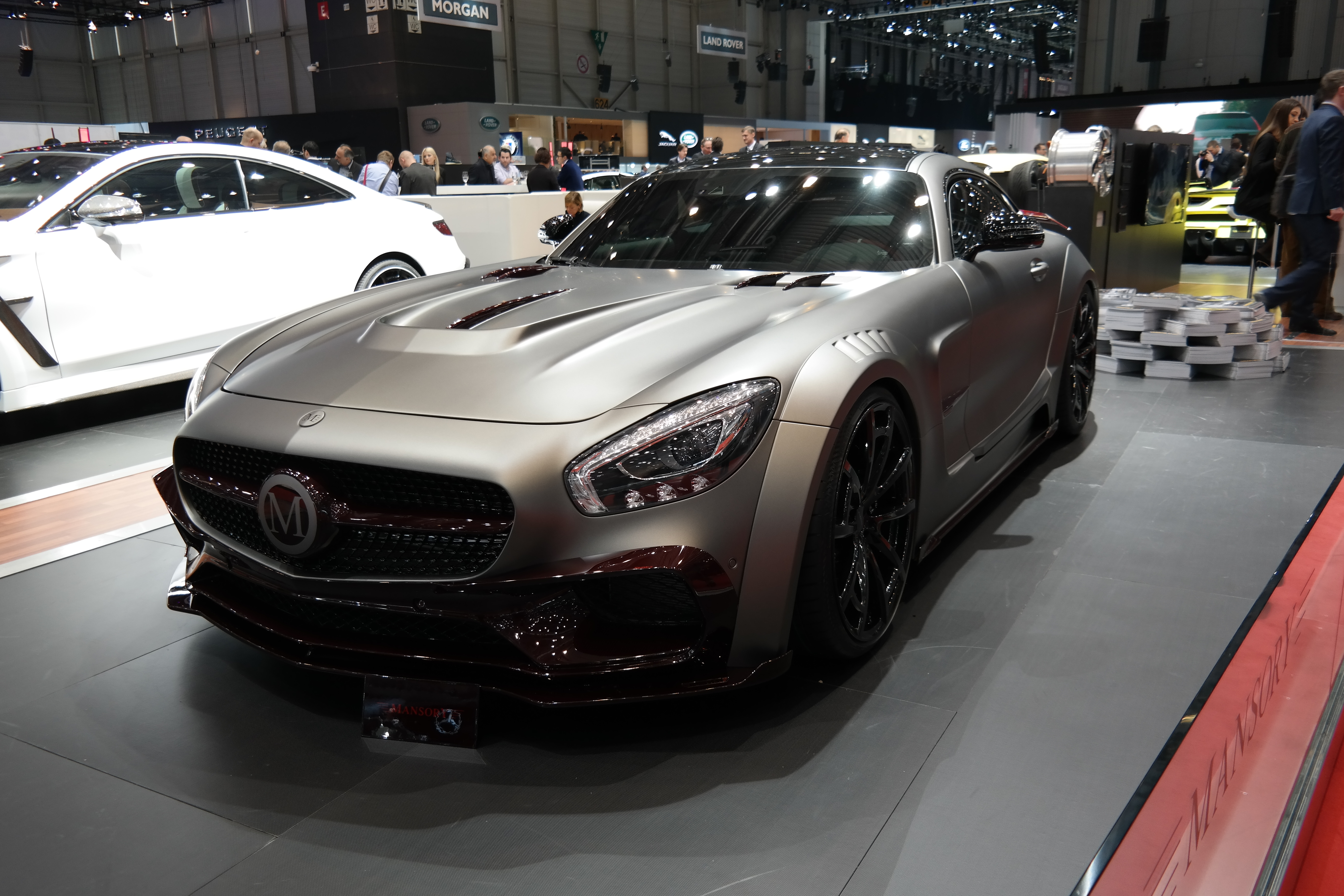
Mansory-tuned Mercedes-AMG GT at the 2016 Geneva Motor Show

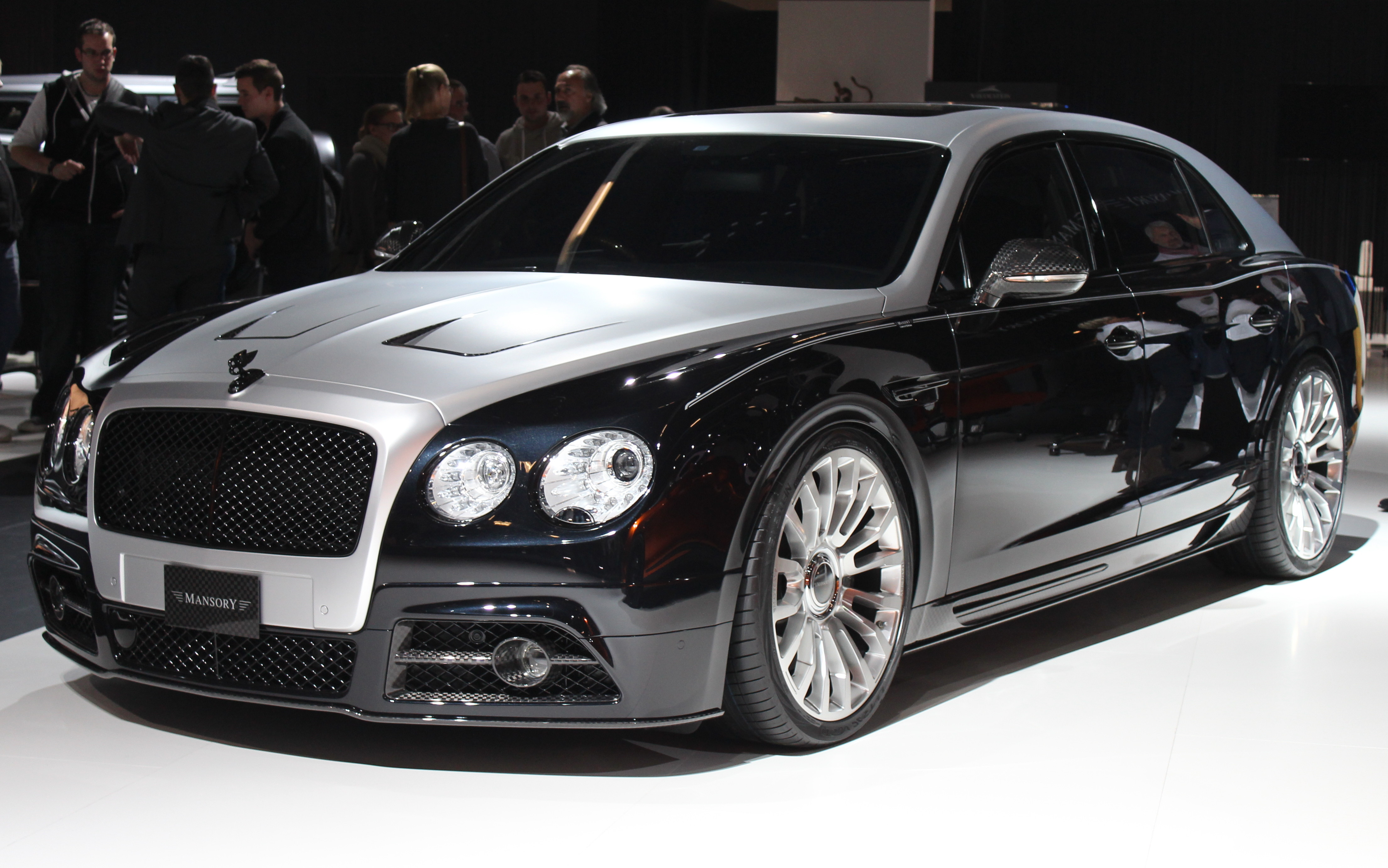
2015 International Motor Show Germany

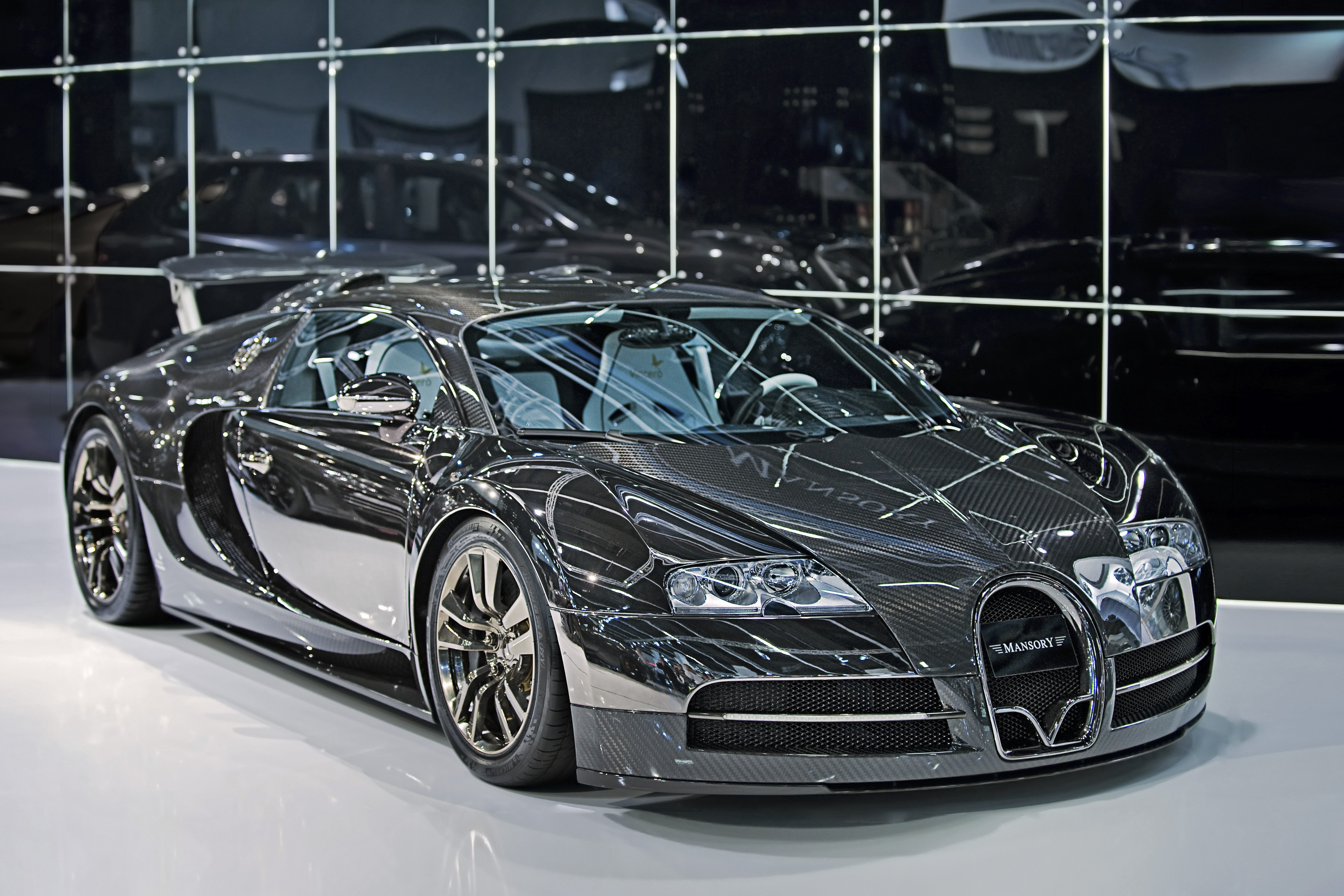
Mansory Bugatti Veyron

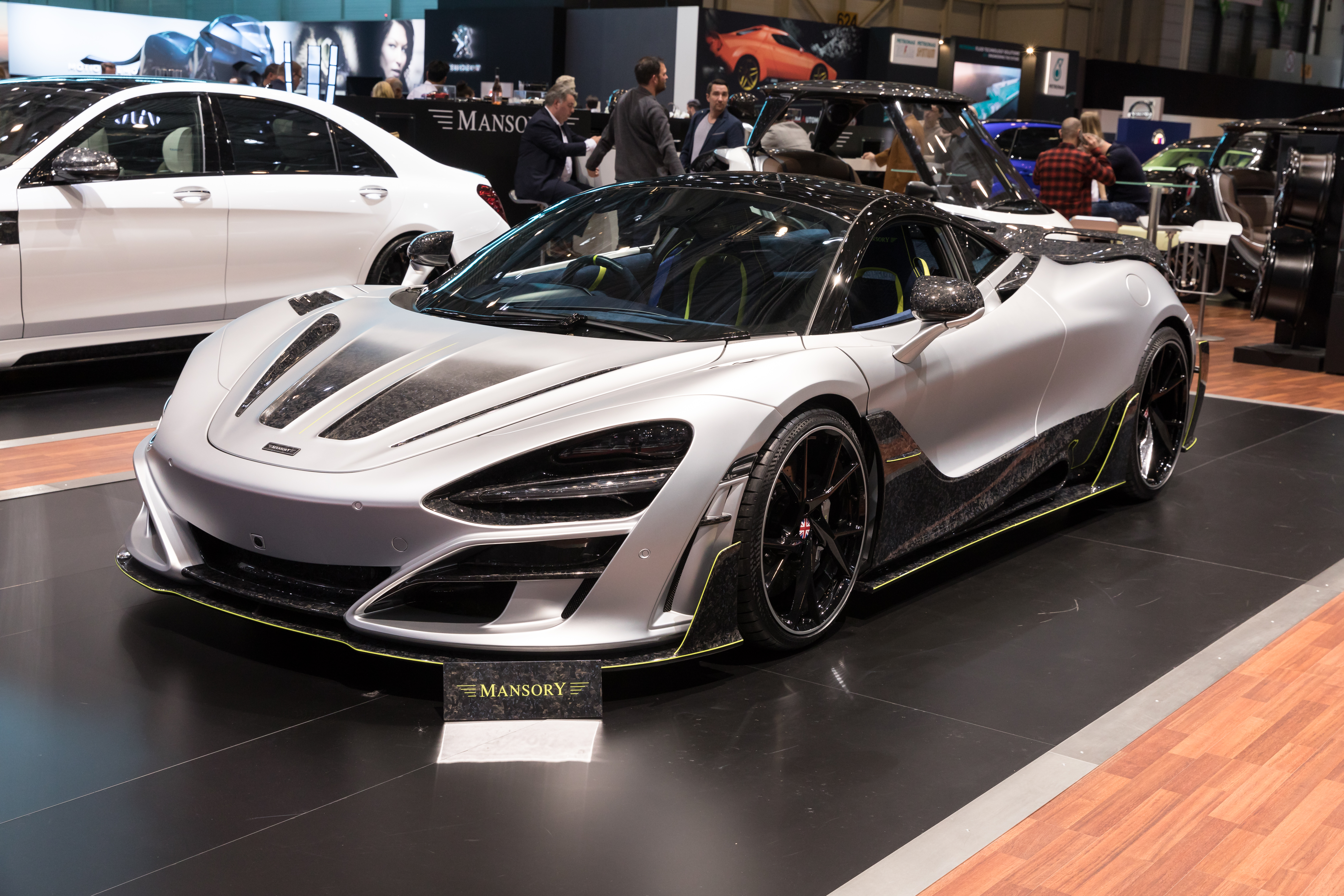
Mansory-tuned McLaren 720S at the 2018 Geneva Motor Show

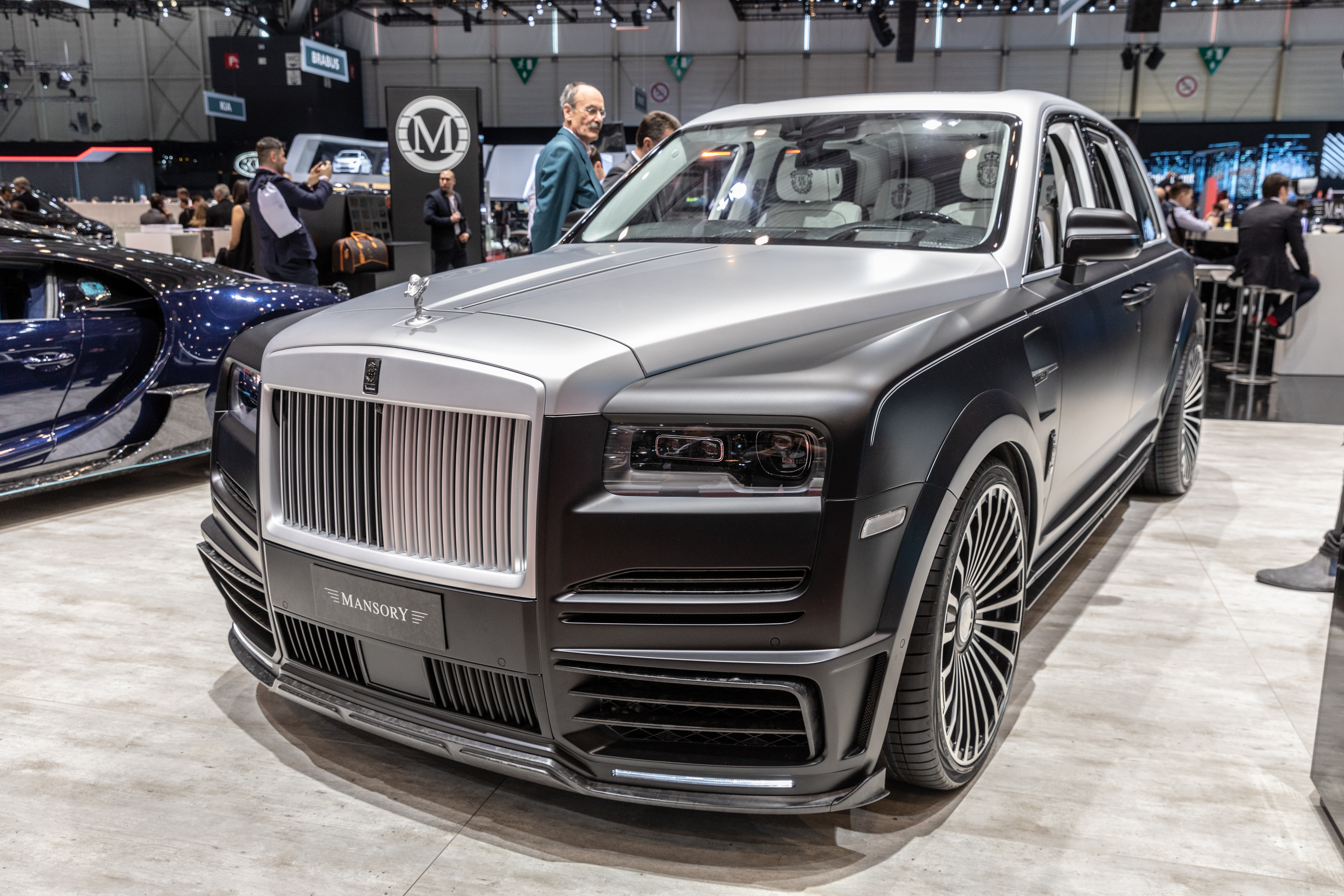
Rolls-Royce Cullinan Mansory Billionaire

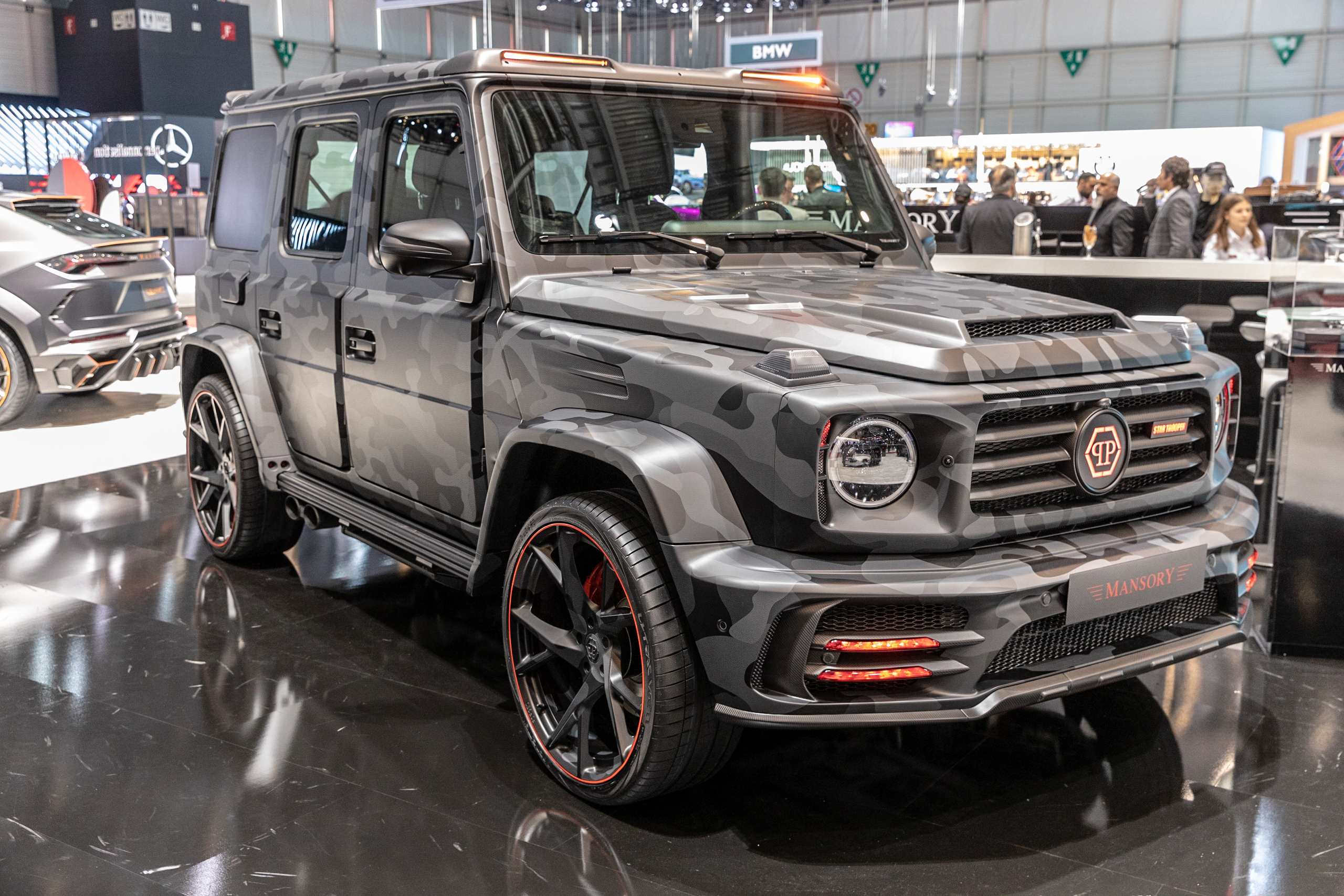
Mercedes-AMG G63 Mansory Star Trooper

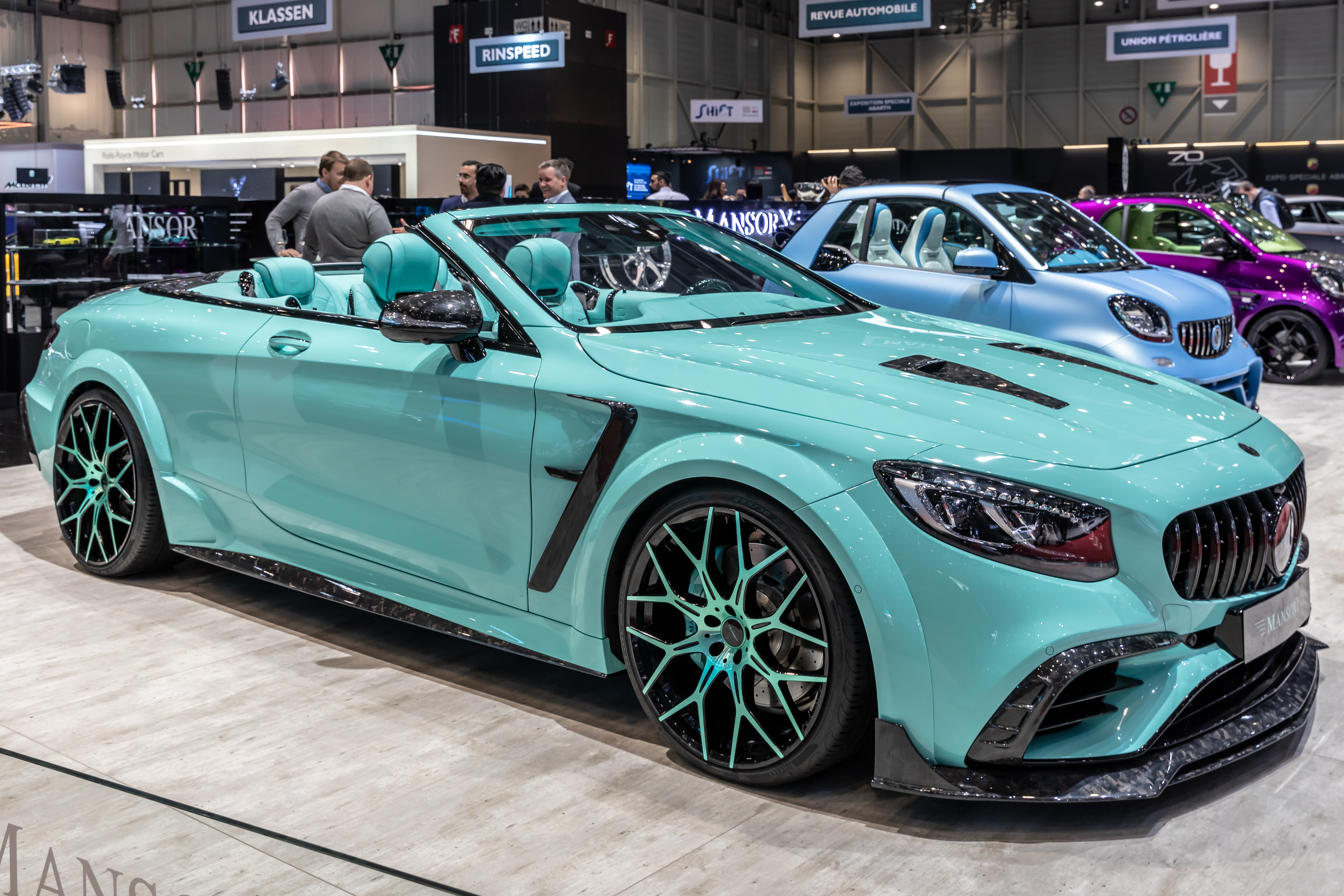
Mercedes-AMG S63 Mansory Apertus

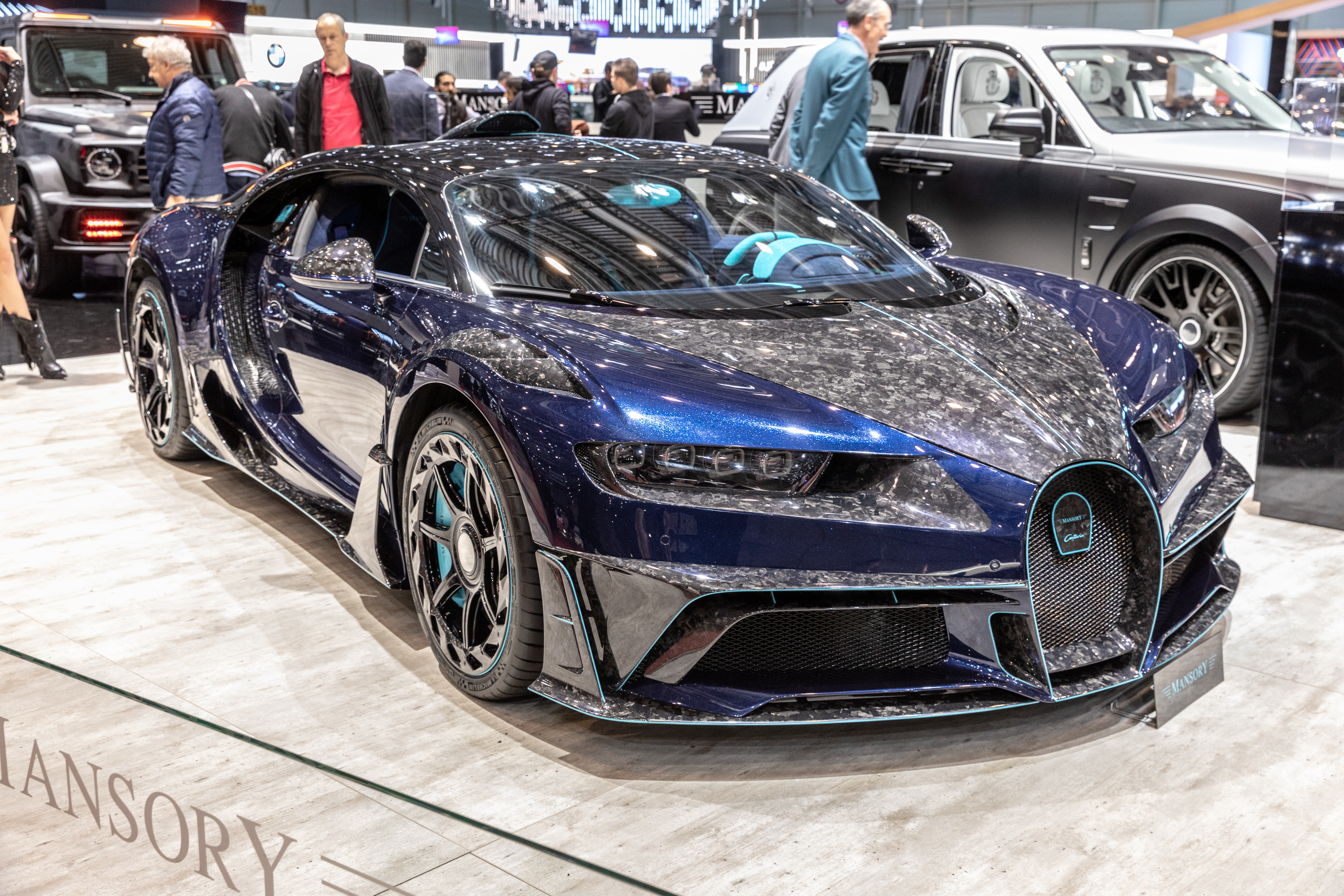
Mansory Bugatti Chiron Centuria

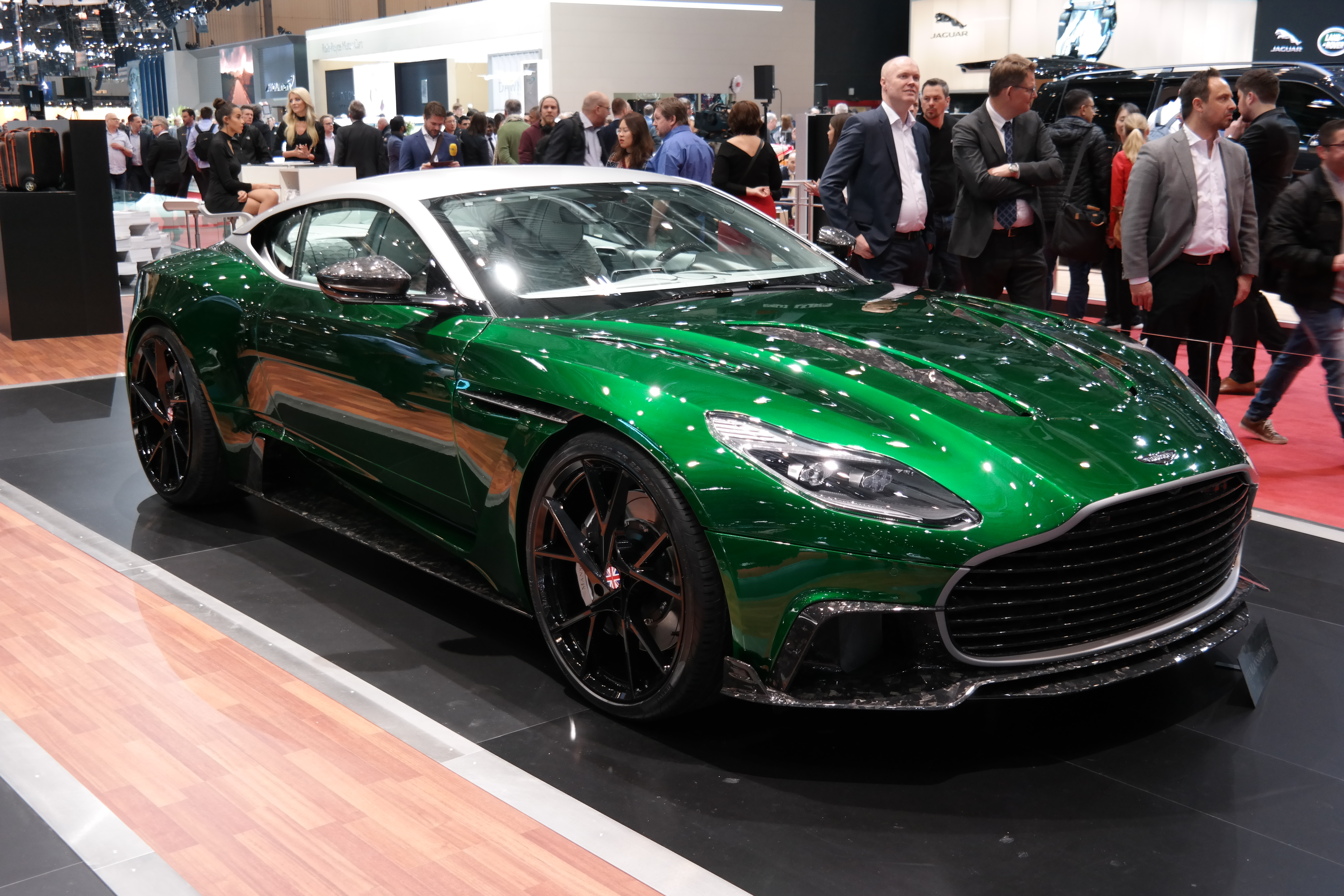
Aston Martin DB11 Cyrus by Mansory

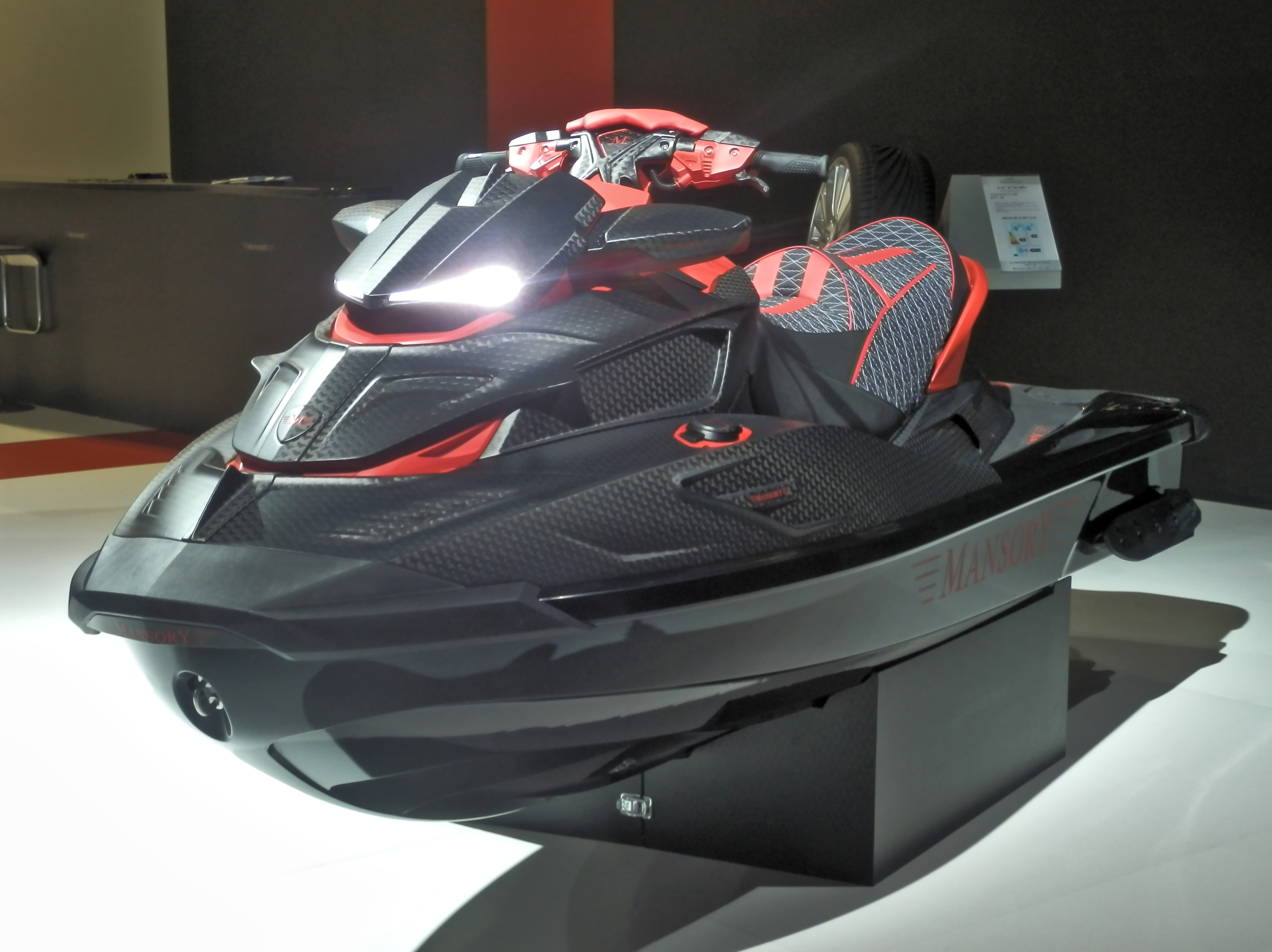
Mansory Black Marlin

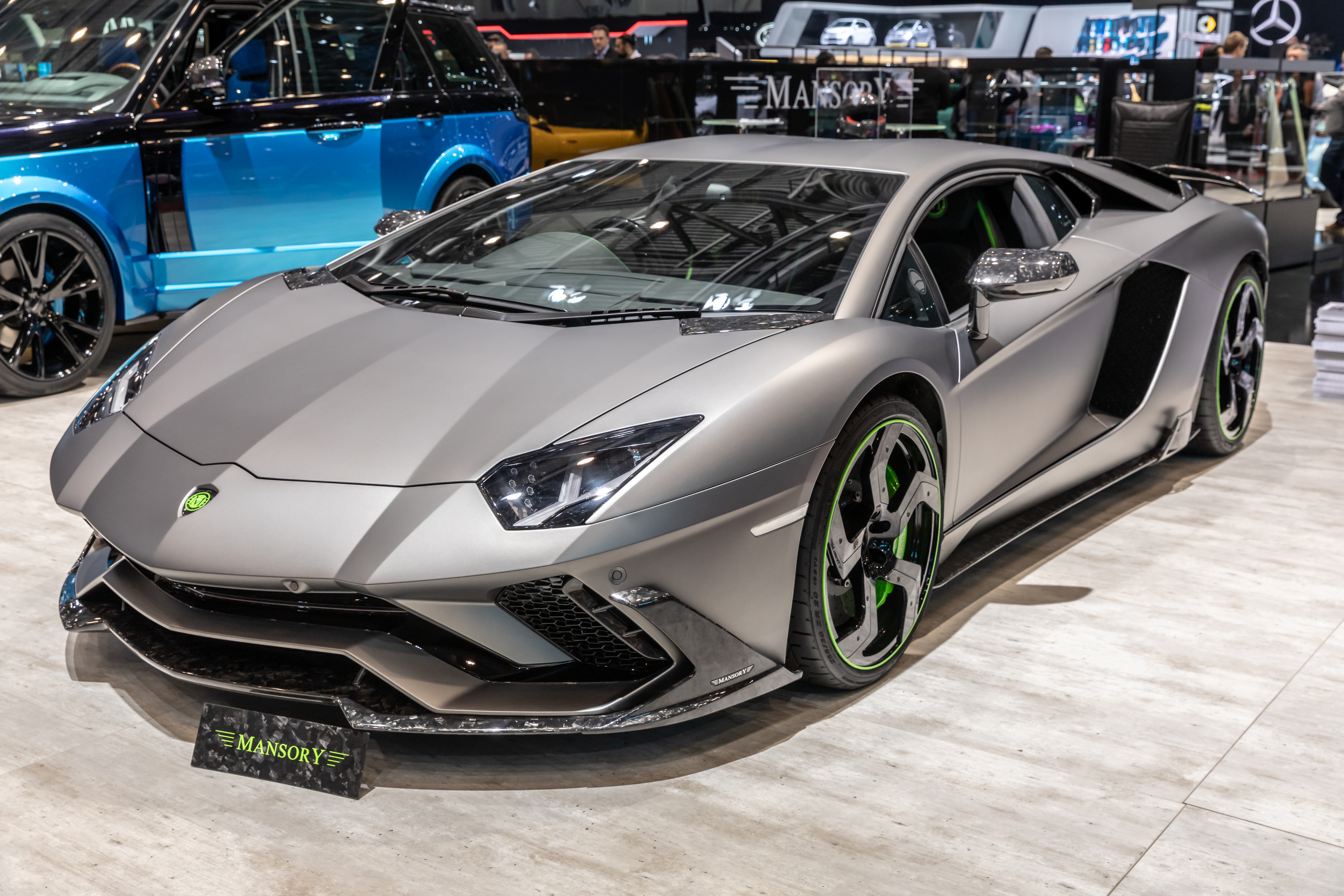
Mansory Aventador

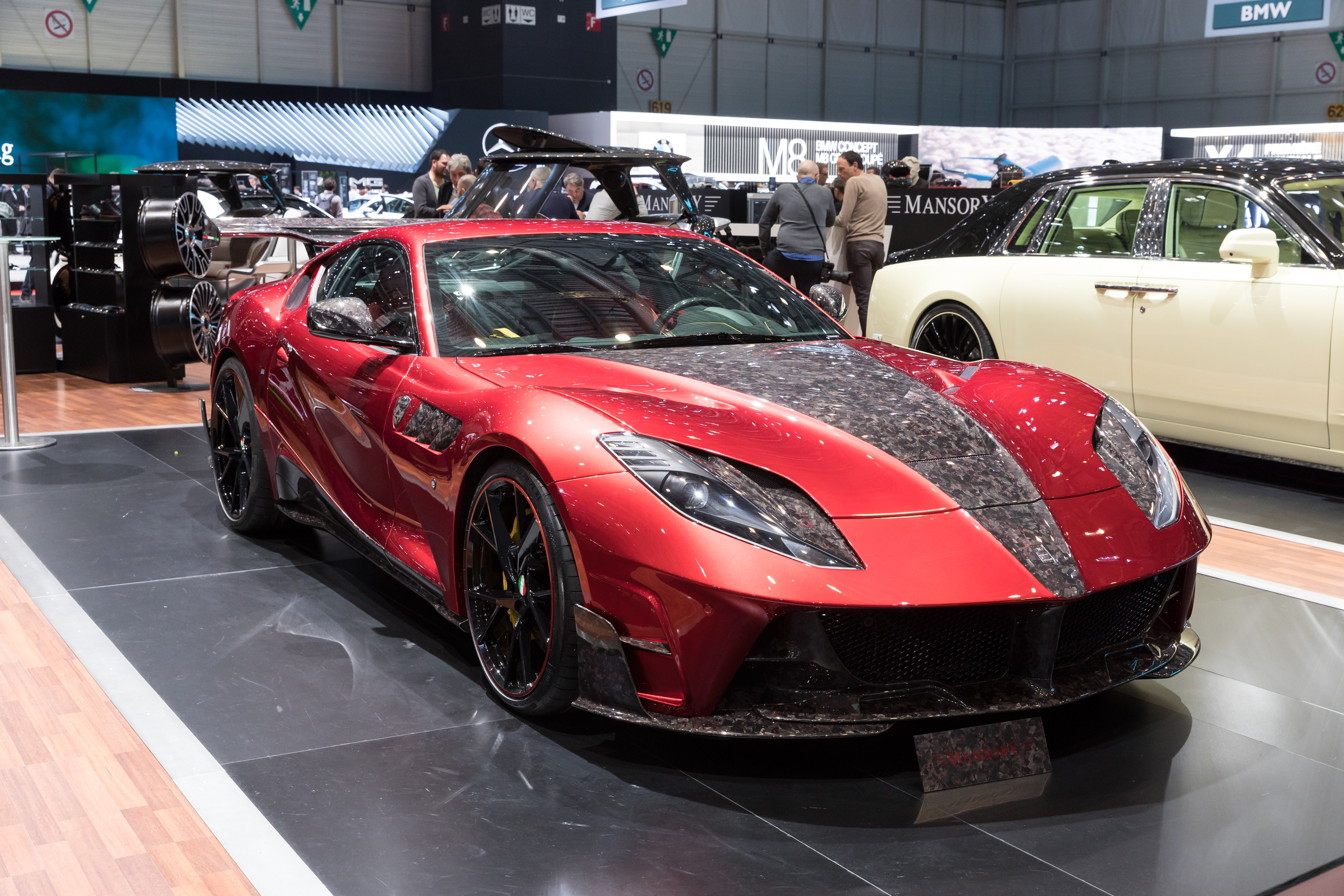
Ferrari 812 Stallone by Mansory

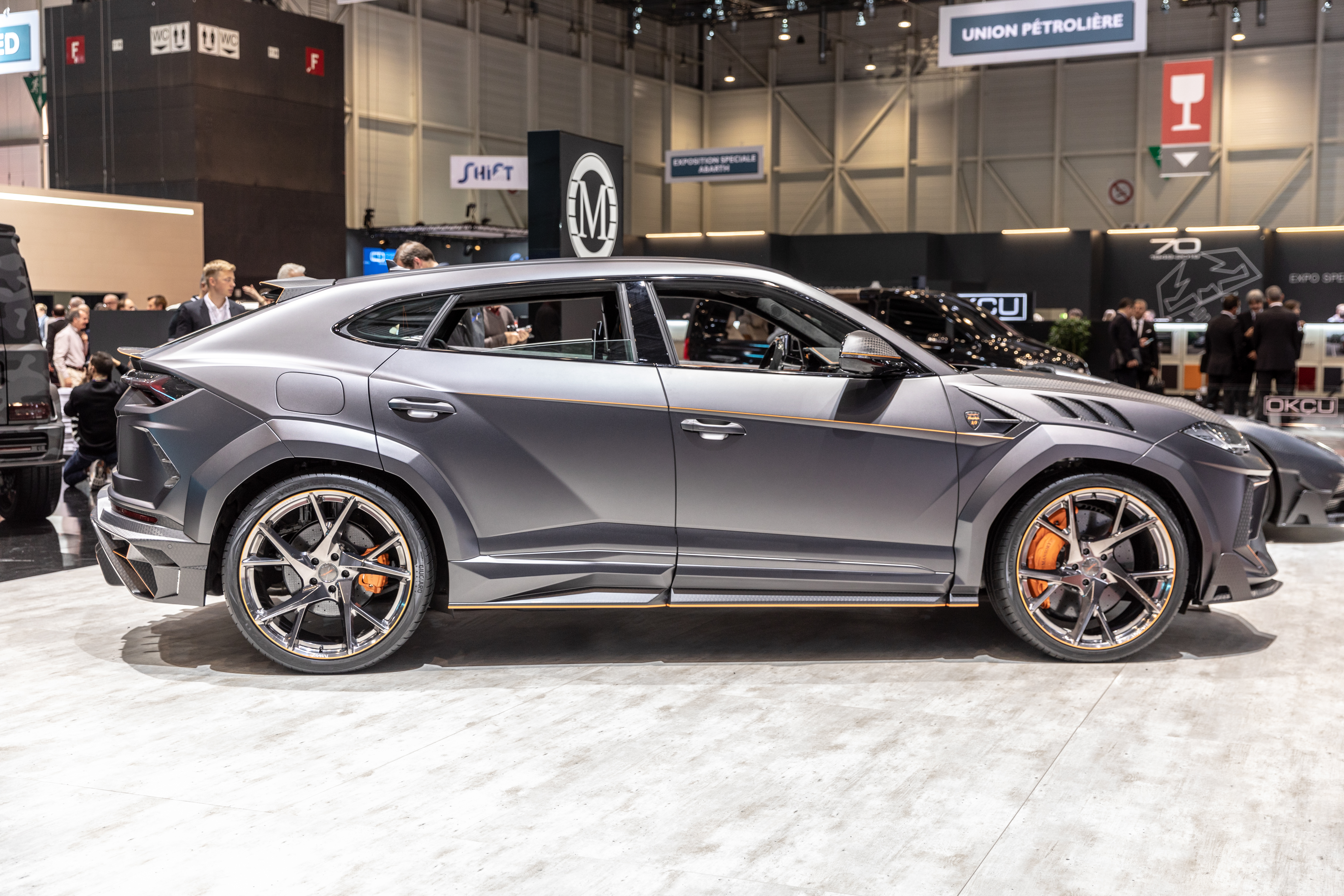
Lamborghini Urus Venatus by Mansory

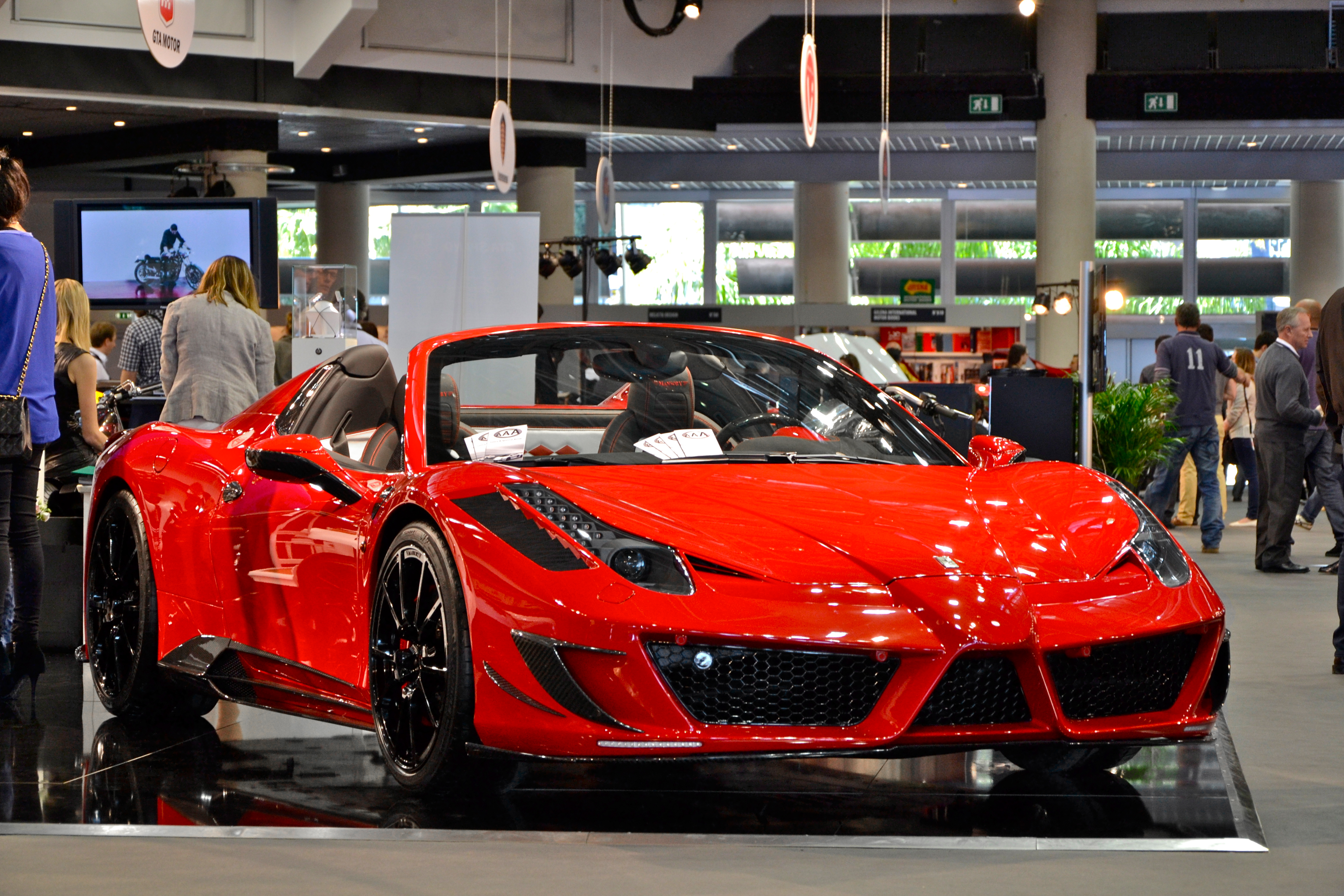
Ferrari 458 Spider Mansory Siracusa Monaco Limited Edition by Mansory

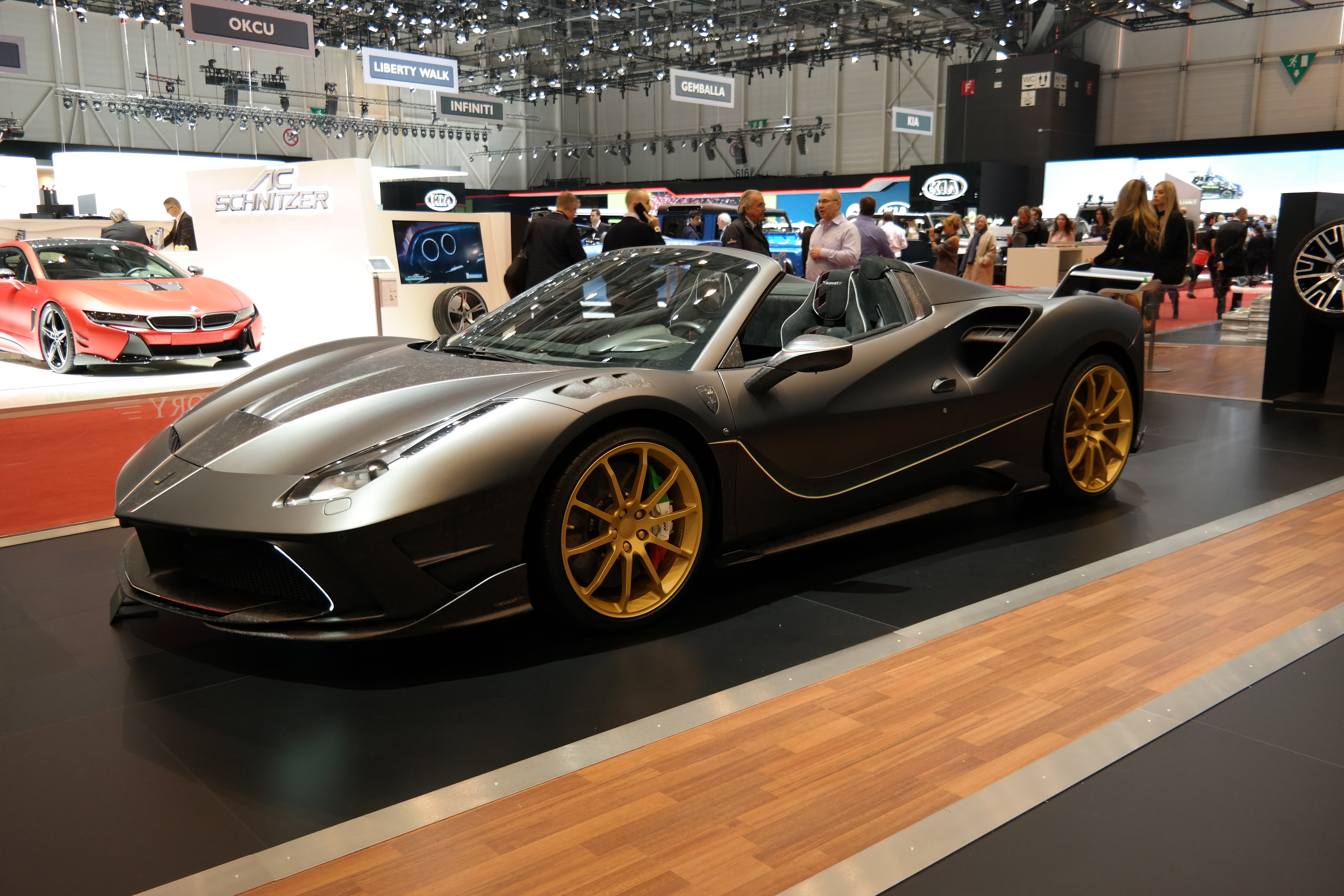
Mansory 488 Spider Siracusa 4XX

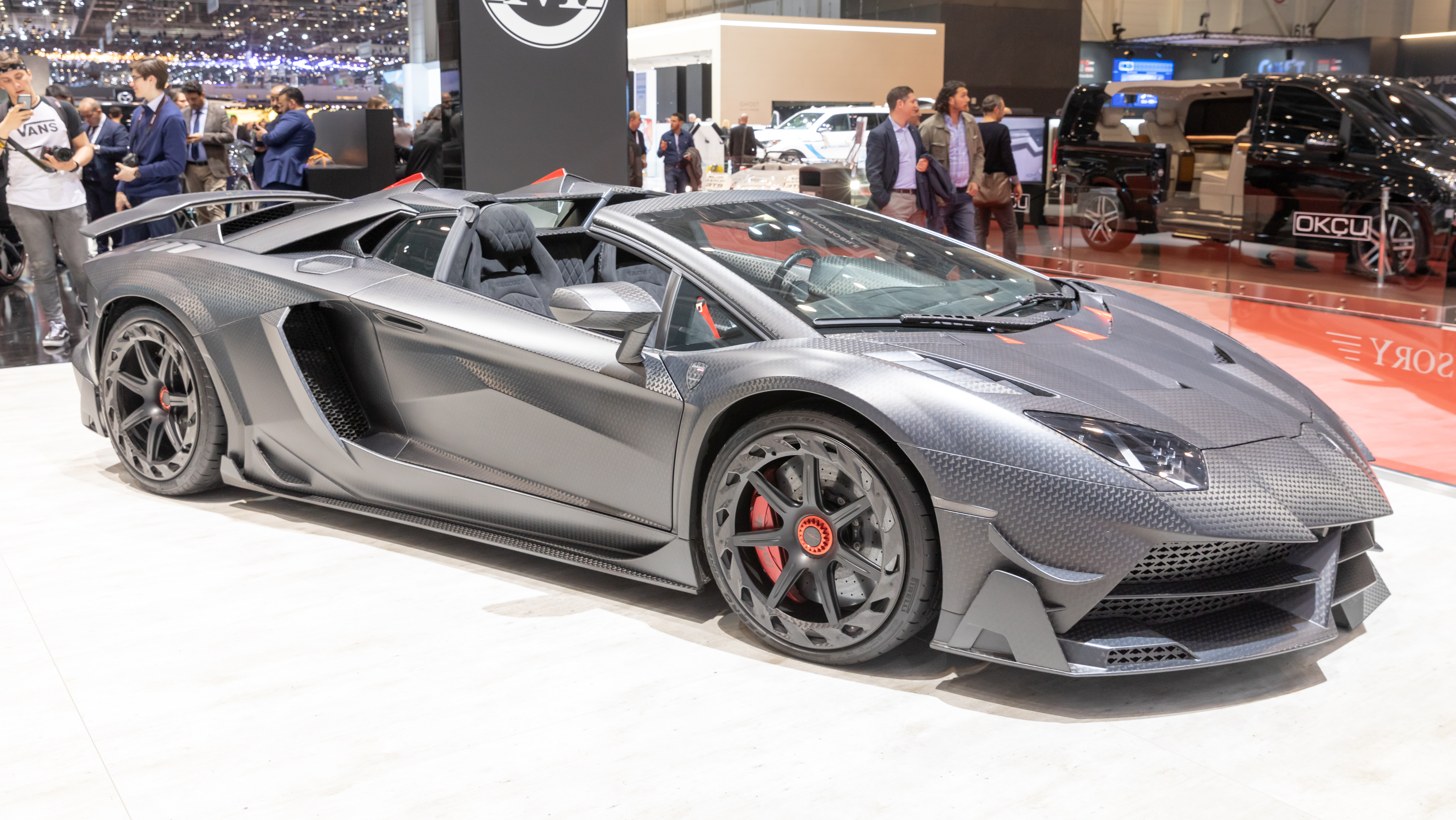
Mansory Aventador Roadster Carbonado Evo

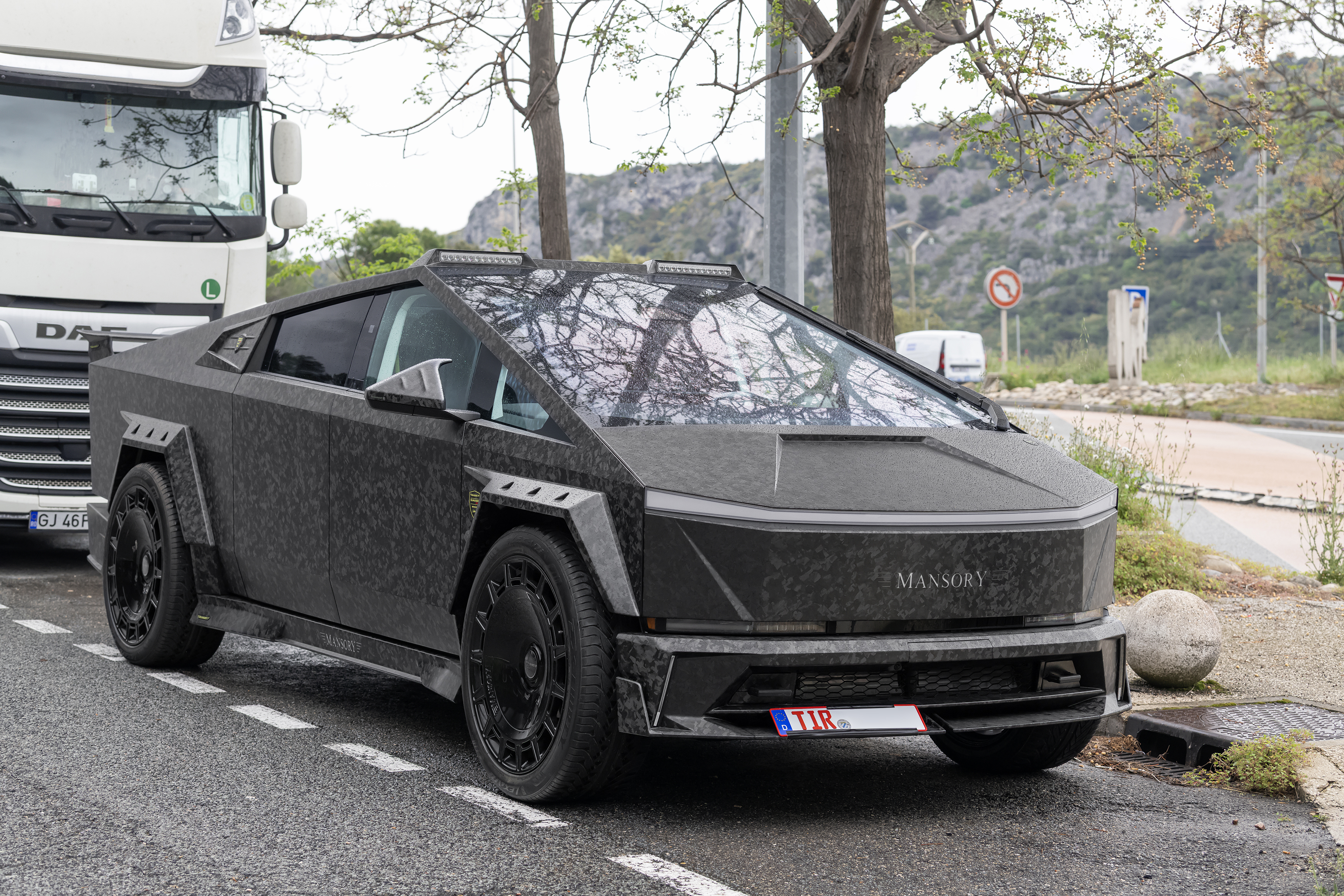
Mansory Cybertruck

== See also ==
- Car tuning
- Luxury vehicle
