= Krummennaab =

- Municipality
- Coat of arms

- Location of Krummennaab within Tirschenreuth district
- Interactive map of Krummennaab
- Location within Germany Location within Bavaria
- Coordinates: 49°49′55″N 12°05′56″E
- Country: Germany
- State: Bavaria
- Admin. region: Oberpfalz
- District: Tirschenreuth
- Municipal assoc.: Krummennaab
- Subdivisions: 18 Ortsteile

Government
  - Mayor (2020–26): Marion Höcht (CSU)

Area
  - Total: 17.72 km^{2} (6.84 sq mi)
- Elevation: 480 m (1,570 ft)

Population (2025-12-31)
  - Total: 1,447
  - Density: 81.66/km^{2} (211.5/sq mi)
- Time zone: UTC+01:00 (CET)
  - Summer (DST): UTC+02:00 (CEST)
- Postal codes: 92703
- Dialling codes: 09682
- Vehicle registration: TIR

Krummennaab is a municipality in the district of Tirschenreuth in Bavaria, Germany.
