= Neusorg =

- Municipality
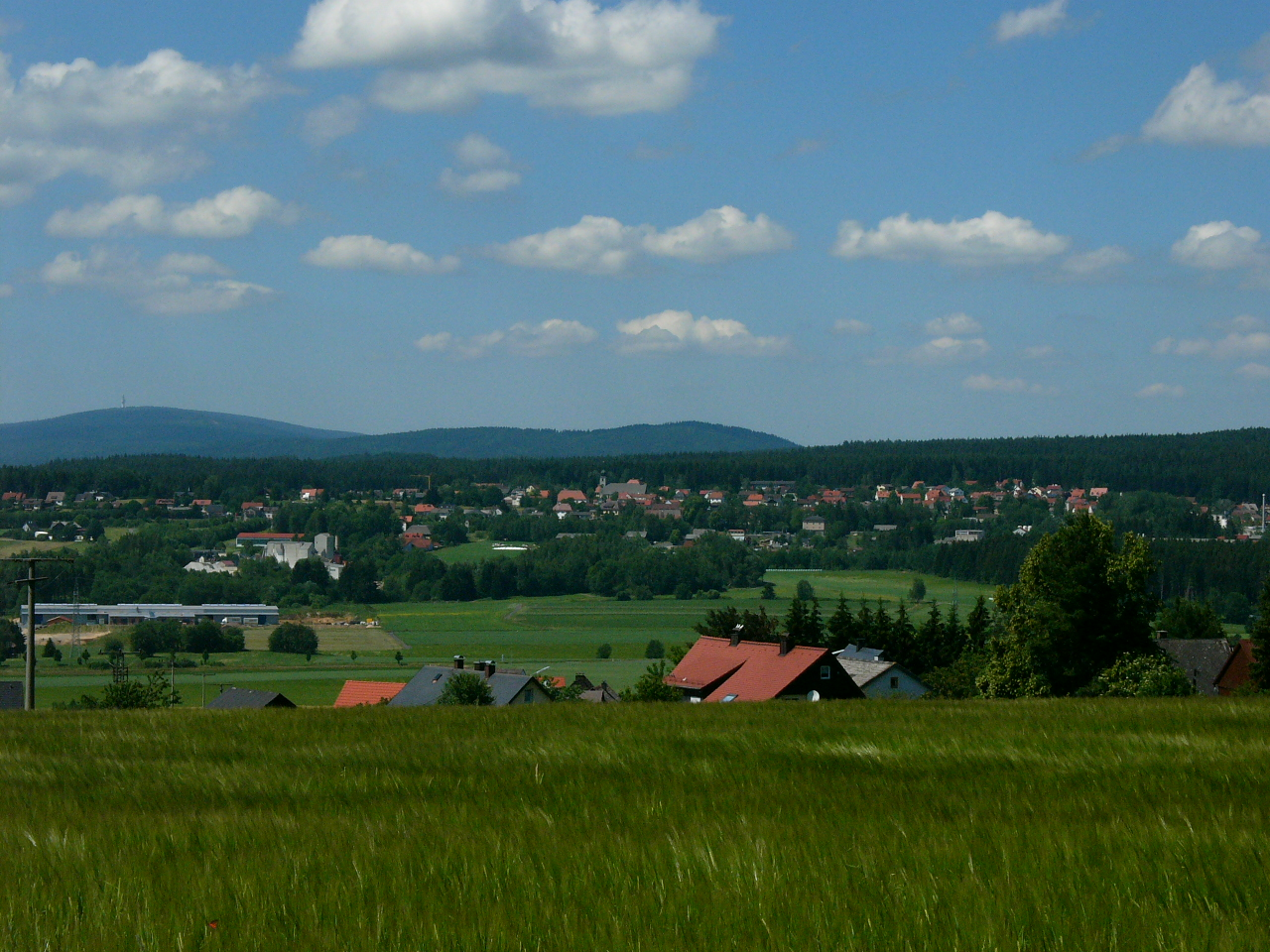
- View of Neusorg from Lochau

- Coat of arms

- Location in Tirschenreuth district
- Interactive map of Neusorg
- Location within Germany Location within Bavaria
- Coordinates: 49°55′N 11°58′E
- Country: Germany
- State: Bavaria
- Admin. region: Oberpfalz
- District: Tirschenreuth
- Municipal assoc.: Neusorg
- Subdivisions: 9 Ortsteile

Government
  - Mayor (2020–26): Peter König (SPD)

Area
  - Total: 17.85 km^{2} (6.89 sq mi)
- Elevation: 573 m (1,880 ft)

Population (2025-12-31)
  - Total: 1,952
  - Density: 109.4/km^{2} (283.2/sq mi)
- Time zone: UTC+01:00 (CET)
  - Summer (DST): UTC+02:00 (CEST)
- Postal codes: 95700
- Dialling codes: 09234
- Vehicle registration: TIR
- Website: www.neusorg.de

Neusorg is a municipality in the district of Tirschenreuth in Bavaria, Germany. The town itself is the seat of Neusorg municipal federation.

== Geography ==
Neusorg has nine Ortsteile: Neusorg, Riglasreuth, Schwarzenreuth, Stockau, Stöcken, Wäsch, Weihermühle, and Wernersreuth.

== History ==
Neusorg was founded around 1535, being first mentioned in writing in 1568, as "Neüesorg". The name Neusorg, German for "new worry", is believed to have been derived from the poor quality soil. As a result, the industry was largely based on mining until 1854.

In 1878, Neusorg was connected to the Nuremberg–Cheb railway, which contributed to the town's growth from only eight houses in the mid-19th-century to forty houses in 1911. During this time, Neusorg became known as Schwarzenreuth, the name of one of its villages which experienced more growth than the main settlement, ultimately becoming the administrative seat. Following World War II, an influx of refugees made Neusorg the larger settlement once more, with residents voting to revert to the name Neusorg on 17 November 1949.

Before the 1970 administrative division reform in Bavaria, Neusorg was part of the district of Kemnath. In 1978, Neusorg became the administrative seat of Neusorg municipal association.
