= Tirschenreuth (district) =

Coordinates: 49°50′N 12°20′E

- District
- Flag Coat of arms
- Country: Germany
- State: Bavaria
- Adm. region: Upper Palatinate
- Capital: Tirschenreuth

Government
  - District admin.: Roland Grillmeier (CSU)

Area
  - Total: 1,085.08 km^{2} (418.95 sq mi)

Population (31 December 2025)
  - Total: 71,768
  - Density: 66.141/km^{2} (171.30/sq mi)
- Time zone: UTC+01:00 (CET)
  - Summer (DST): UTC+02:00 (CEST)
- Vehicle registration: TIR, KEM
- Website: https://www.kreis-tir.de

Tirschenreuth (Northern Bavarian: Landgreis Tirschenreith) is a Landkreis (district) in the northeastern part of Bavaria, Germany. Neighboring districts are (from the south, clockwise) Neustadt an der Waldnaab, Bayreuth and Wunsiedel. To the east are the Czech districts of Tachov (Plzeň) and Cheb (Karlovy Vary).

== Geography ==
The district is located in the hills of the Fichtelgebirge. The main rivers in the district are the Waldnaab and the Fichtelnaab.

== History ==
The district was formed in 1972 by merging the previous districts Tirschenreuth and Kemnath.

== Coat of arms ==
The golden lion in the left of the coat of arms is the symbol of the Electorate of the Palatinate. The red dragon in the right is the symbol of the Waldsassen Abbey, and symbolizes the margravate of Diepolding. Only the upper part of the dragon is shown (while the monastery had the full dragon as their symbol), to symbolize that the status of the monastery was reduced in 1803 from an imperial monastery to a subordinate of the Palatinate. The blue bar in the bottom right is the symbol of the landgraves of Leuchtenberg, parts of the historically owned by them was included into the district in 1972.

== Towns and municipalities ==
Clickable map of towns and municipalities in the district

Towns
1. Bärnau
2. Erbendorf
3. Tirschenreuth
4. Waldershof
5. Waldsassen
Markt
1. Bad Neualbenreuth
2. Fuchsmühl
3. Konnersreuth
4. Mähring
5. Plößberg
Free municipalities
1. Friedenfels
2. Immenreuth
3. Kulmain

Verwaltungsgemeinschaften
1. Kemnath; 1. Kastl; 2. Kemnath^{1,2}	2. Krummennaab; 1. Krummennaab^{1}; 2. Reuth bei Erbendorf	3. Mitterteich; 1. Leonberg; 2. Mitterteich^{1,2}; 3. Pechbrunn	4. Neusorg; 1. Brand; 2. Ebnath; 3. Neusorg^{1}; 4. Pullenreuth	5. Wiesau; 1. Falkenberg^{3}; 2. Wiesau^{1,3}
^{1}seat of the Verwaltungsgemeinschaft; ^{2}town; ^{3}Markt
