= Krummennaab (Verwaltungsgemeinschaft) =

- Verwaltungsgemeinschaft
- Location of Krummennaab within Tirschenreuth district
- Interactive map of Krummennaab
- Location within Germany Location within Bavaria
- Coordinates: 49°50′N 12°06′E
- Country: Germany
- State: Bavaria
- Admin. region: Upper Palatinate
- District: Tirschenreuth
- Seat: Krummennaab
- Subdivisions: 2 municipalities

Area
  - Total: 34.59 km^{2} (13.36 sq mi)

Population (2025-12-31)
  - Total: 2,556
  - Density: 73.89/km^{2} (191.4/sq mi)
- Time zone: UTC+01:00 (CET)
  - Summer (DST): UTC+02:00 (CEST)
- Website: vg-krummennaab.de

Krummennaab is a Verwaltungsgemeinschaft (municipal association) in the district of Tirschenreuth in Bavaria, Germany. Its seat is in Krummennaab.

It consists of the following municipalities:

1. Krummennaab
2. Reuth bei Erbendorf
