= Pechbrunn =

- Municipality
- Coat of arms

- Location of Pechbrunn within Tirschenreuth district
- Interactive map of Pechbrunn
- Location within Germany Location within Bavaria
- Coordinates: 49°58′N 12°10′E
- Country: Germany
- State: Bavaria
- Admin. region: Oberpfalz
- District: Tirschenreuth
- Municipal assoc.: Mitterteich
- Subdivisions: 3 Ortsteile

Government
  - Mayor (2020–26): Stephan Schübel (CSU)

Area
  - Total: 26.46 km^{2} (10.22 sq mi)
- Elevation: 560 m (1,840 ft)

Population (2025-12-31)
  - Total: 1,282
  - Density: 48.45/km^{2} (125.5/sq mi)
- Time zone: UTC+01:00 (CET)
  - Summer (DST): UTC+02:00 (CEST)
- Postal codes: 95701
- Dialling codes: 09231
- Vehicle registration: TIR
- Website: www.pechbrunn.de

Pechbrunn is a municipality in the district of Tirschenreuth in Bavaria, Germany.
