= Falkenberg, Upper Palatinate =

Falkenberg
- Municipality
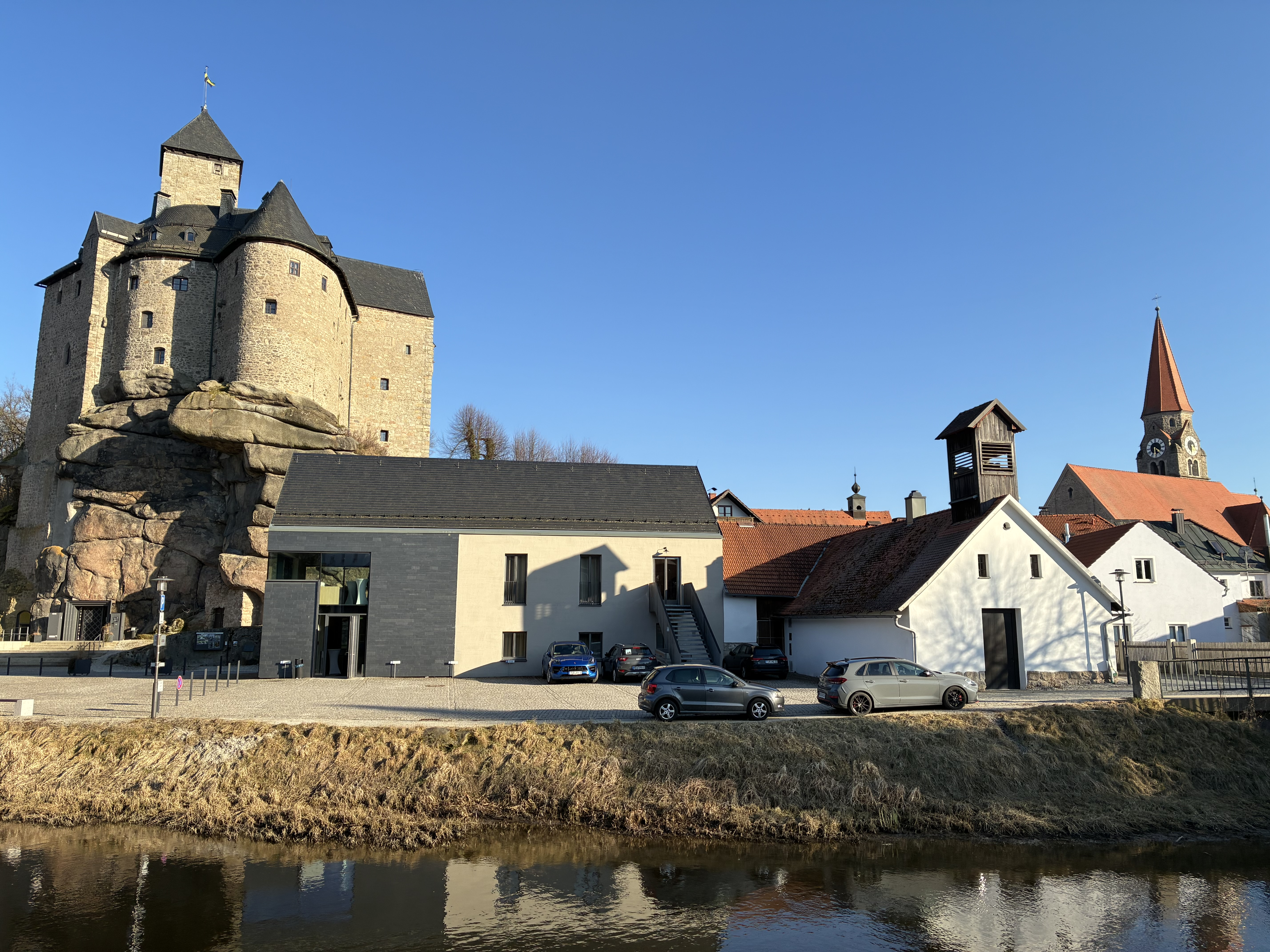
- Falkenberg (Oberpfalz)

- Coat of arms

- Location of Falkenberg within Tirschenreuth district
- Interactive map of Falkenberg
- Location within Germany Location within Bavaria
- Coordinates: 49°52′N 12°13′E
- Country: Germany
- State: Bavaria
- Admin. region: Oberpfalz
- District: Tirschenreuth
- Municipal assoc.: Wiesau
- Subdivisions: 10 Ortsteile

Government
  - Mayor (2020–26): Matthias Grundler (CSU)

Area
  - Total: 39.41 km^{2} (15.22 sq mi)
- Elevation: 450–510 m (1,480–1,670 ft)

Population (2025-12-31)
  - Total: 918
  - Density: 23.3/km^{2} (60.3/sq mi)
- Time zone: UTC+01:00 (CET)
  - Summer (DST): UTC+02:00 (CEST)
- Postal codes: 95685
- Dialling codes: 09637
- Vehicle registration: TIR
- Website: www.markt-falkenberg.de

Falkenberg (German pronunciation: [ˈfalkŋ̍ˌbɛʁk]) is a municipality in the district of Tirschenreuth in Bavaria, Germany.
