= Wies =

Wies may refer to multiple topics:

== Places ==
- Wies, Austria
- Wies, Baden-Württemberg, Germany
- Wies, Waldbröl, Germany
- Wies pilgrimage church, Germany

== People ==
- Gerhard Wies (born 11 April 1961), German athlete
- Nelly Wies-Weyrich (1933–2019), Luxembourgish archer
- Wies Moens (1898–1982), Belgian author
- Wies van Dongen (born 1931), Dutch racing cyclist
