= Wiesau =

- Municipality
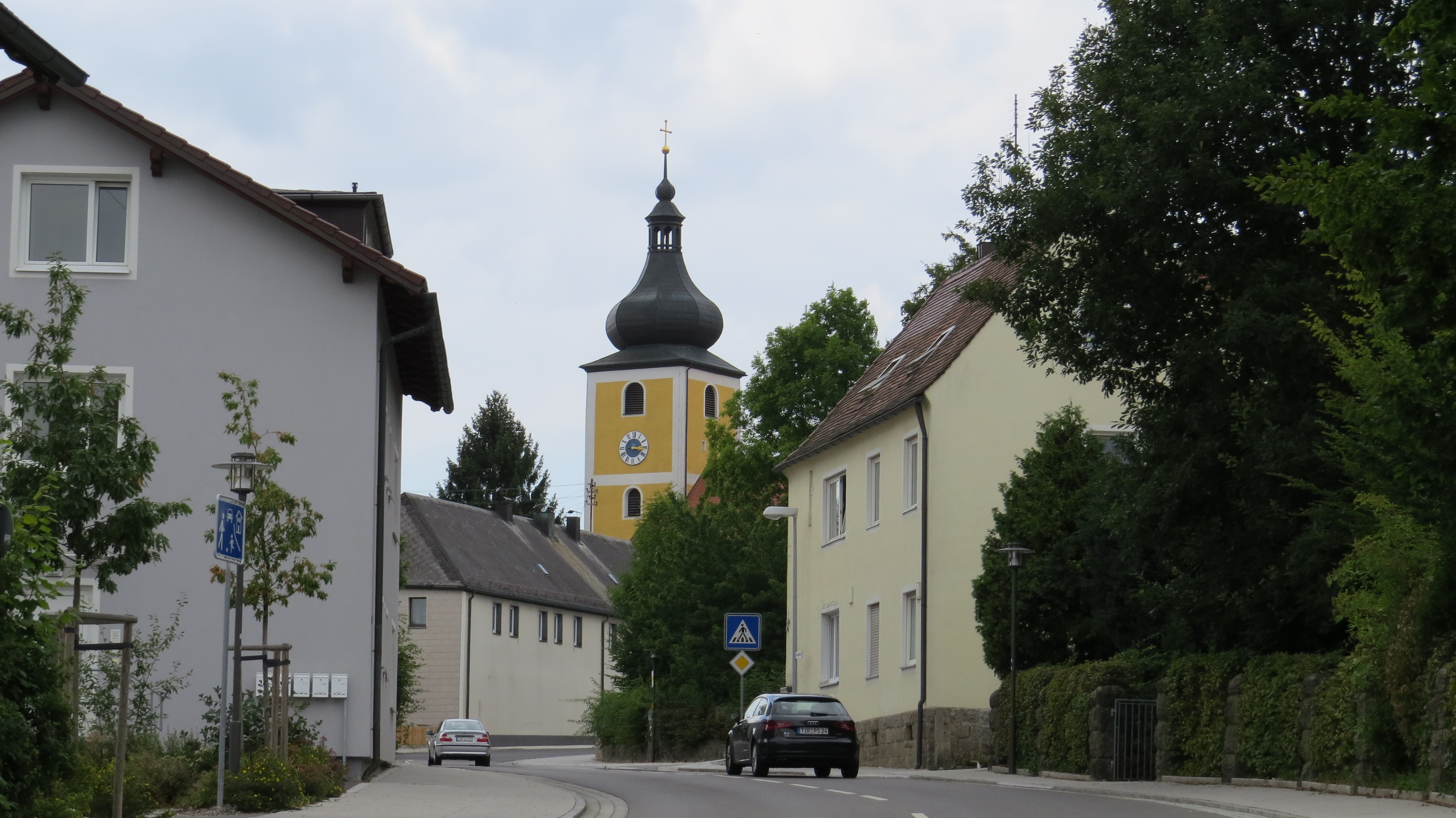
- Main street in Wiesau

- Coat of arms

- Location of Wiesau within Tirschenreuth district
- Interactive map of Wiesau
- Location within Germany Location within Bavaria
- Coordinates: 49°55′N 12°10′E
- Country: Germany
- State: Bavaria
- Admin. region: Oberpfalz
- District: Tirschenreuth
- Municipal assoc.: Wiesau
- Subdivisions: 14 Orte

Government
  - Mayor (2020–26): Toni Dutz (CSU)

Area
  - Total: 42.72 km^{2} (16.49 sq mi)
- Elevation: 490–550 m (1,610–1,800 ft)

Population (2025-12-31)
  - Total: 3,823
  - Density: 89.49/km^{2} (231.8/sq mi)
- Time zone: UTC+01:00 (CET)
  - Summer (DST): UTC+02:00 (CEST)
- Postal codes: 95676
- Dialling codes: 09634
- Vehicle registration: TIR
- Website: www.wiesau.de

Wiesau is a municipality in the district of Tirschenreuth in Bavaria, Germany.
