= Kemnath =

- Town
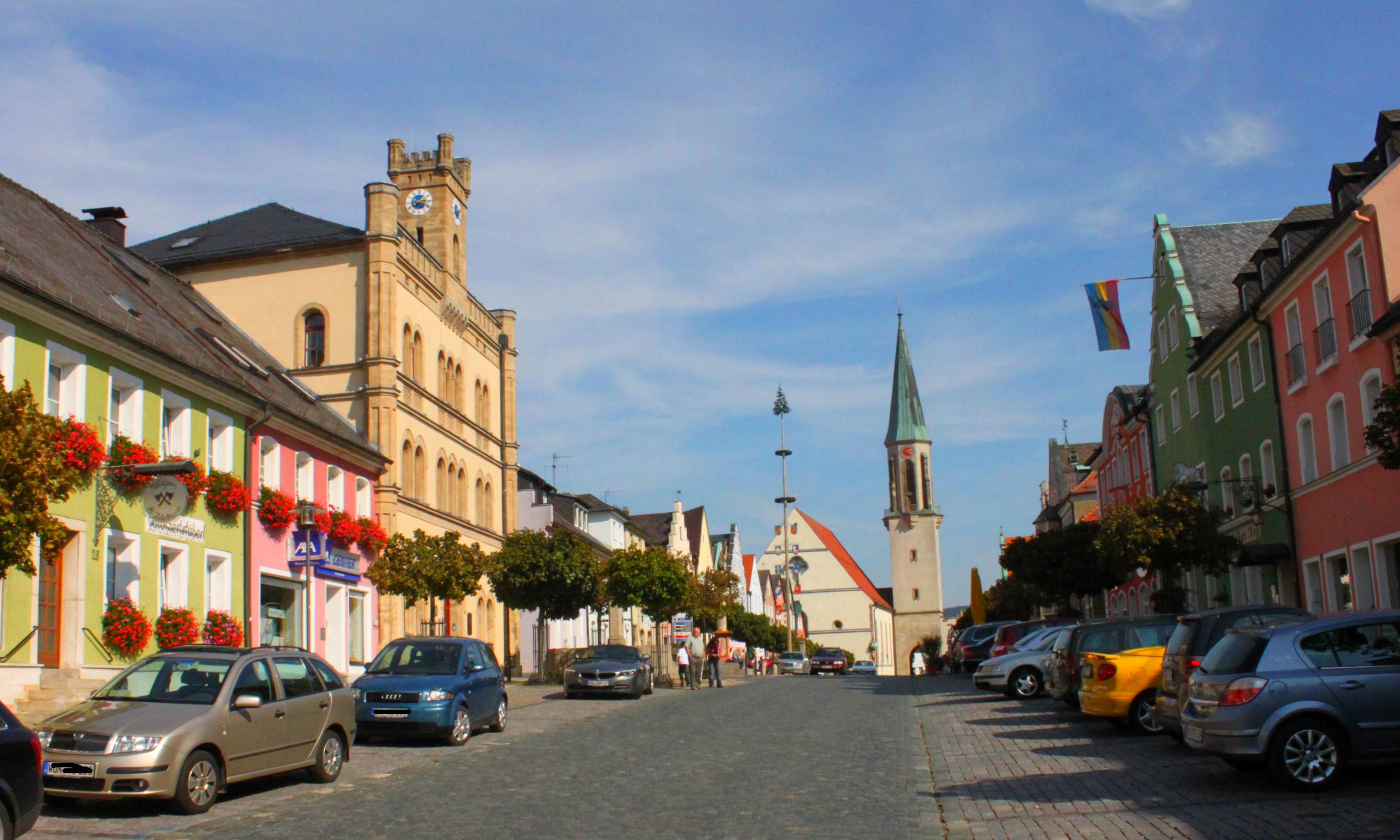
- Town square with the Church of the Assumption of the Virgin Mary

- Coat of arms

- Location of Kemnath within Tirschenreuth district
- Interactive map of Kemnath
- Location within Germany Location within Bavaria
- Coordinates: 49°52′N 11°53′E
- Country: Germany
- State: Bavaria
- Admin. region: Oberpfalz
- District: Tirschenreuth
- Municipal assoc.: Kemnath

Government
  - Mayor (2020–26): Roman Schäffler (CSU)

Area
  - Total: 56.8 km^{2} (21.9 sq mi)
- Elevation: 462 m (1,516 ft)

Population (2025-12-31)
  - Total: 5,893
  - Density: 104/km^{2} (269/sq mi)
- Time zone: UTC+01:00 (CET)
  - Summer (DST): UTC+02:00 (CEST)
- Postal codes: 95478
- Dialling codes: 09642
- Vehicle registration: TIR, KEM
- Website: www.kemnath.de

Kemnath (German: [ˈkɛm.naːt]; Bavarian: Kemmat) is a small town in the district of Tirschenreuth, in Bavaria, Germany. It is situated near the Fichtel Mountains, 24 km southeast of Bayreuth.

== History ==
Kemnath was first referenced in historical documents on 6 July 1008 by the Holy Roman Emperor Henry II when he donated Keminata to the Diocese of Bamberg. In 2008, Kemnath celebrated its 1000th anniversary with a series of special events throughout the town culminating in a major celebration in August 2008.

== Geography ==
The town is in the foothills of the Fichtel Mountains of northeast Bavaria and is approximately 55 km from the Czech border at Mähring. It is located in a valley formed by three streams, the Mühlbach, Flötzbach, and Schirnitzbach. The Steinwald Nature Park abuts the edge of the town as well and stretches from Kemnath to the Czech border.

The town's motto is "das Tor zur Oberpfalz," which translates into English as "The Door to the Upper Palatinate."

== Economy ==
The two largest employers in Kemnath are the Ponnath Meat Processing plant and a Siemens Healthineers production facility.
