= Steinwald =

Mountain range in Germany

Coordinates: 49.910°N 12.053°E

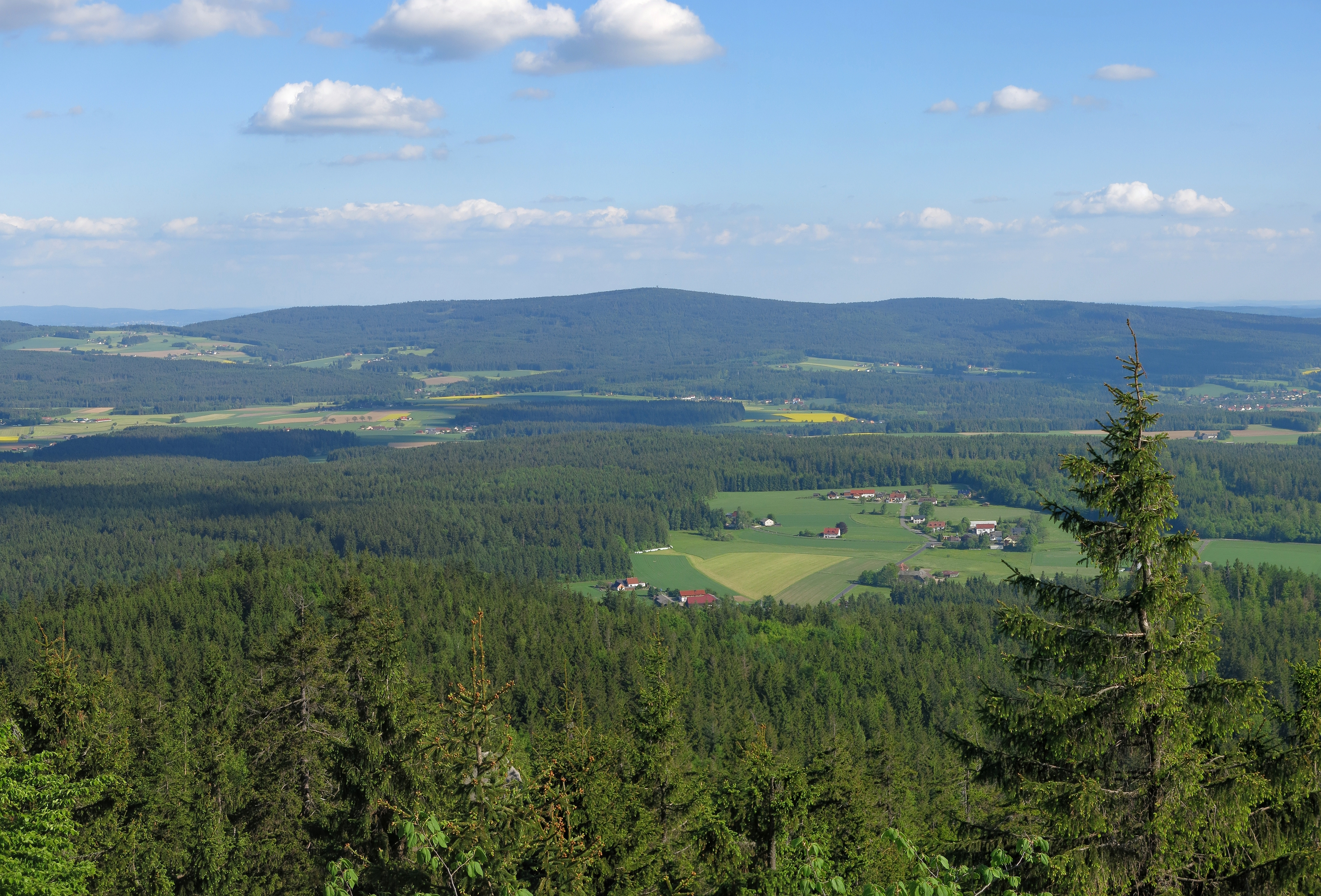
View of the Steinwald from the Kösseine

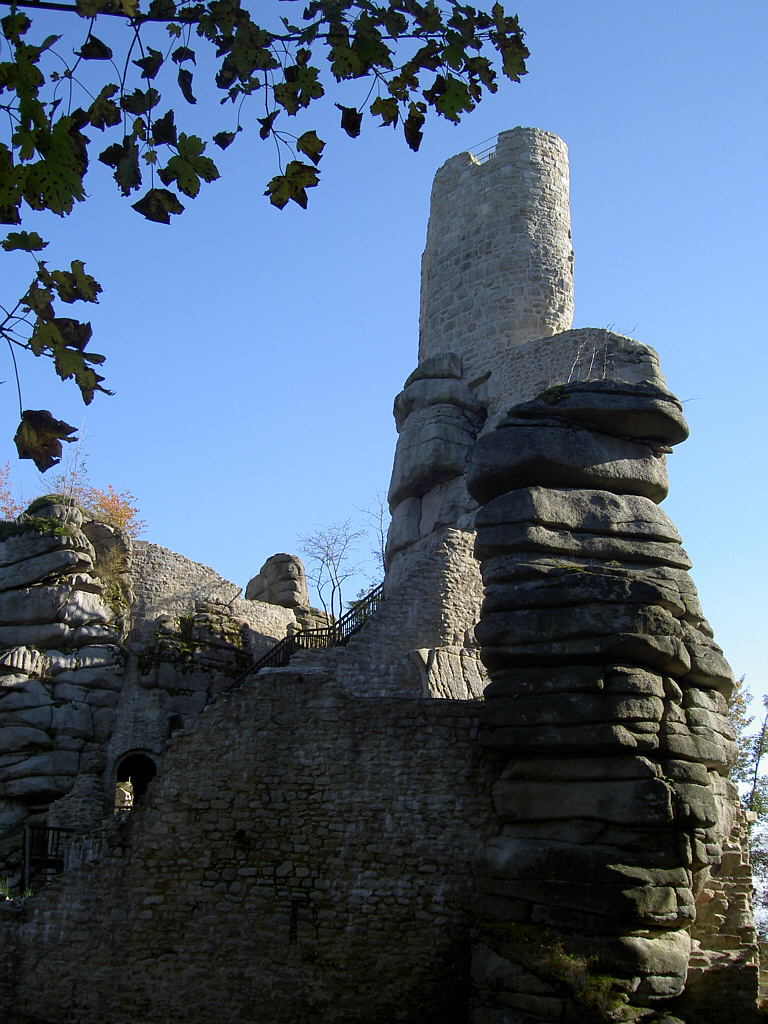
Ruins of Weißenstein

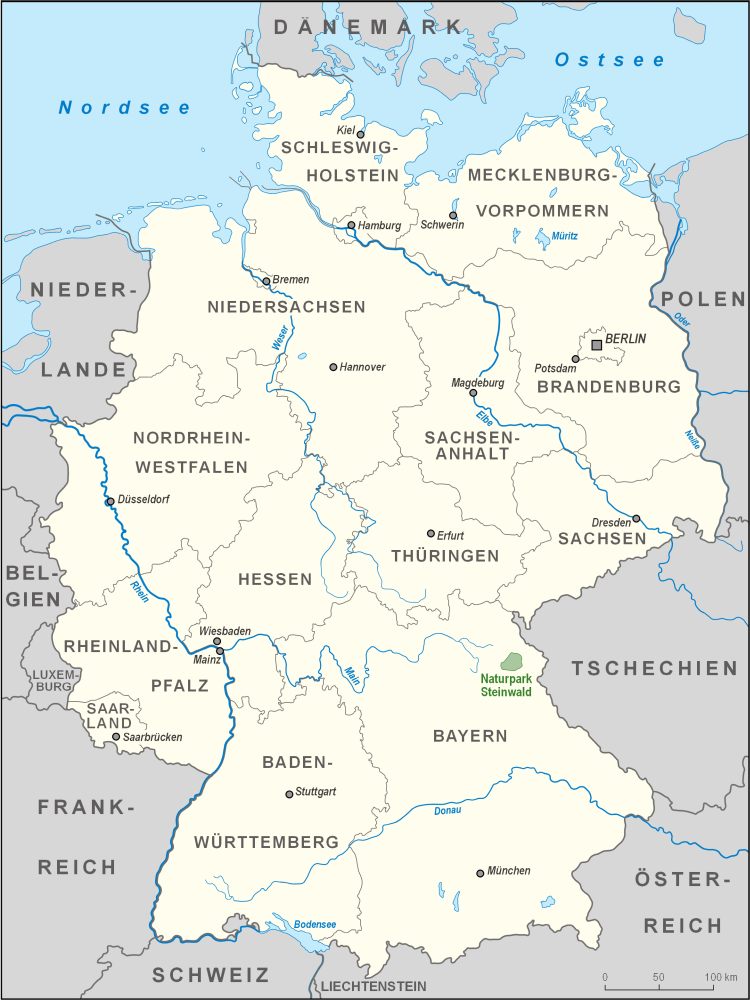
Location of the Steinwald Nature Park

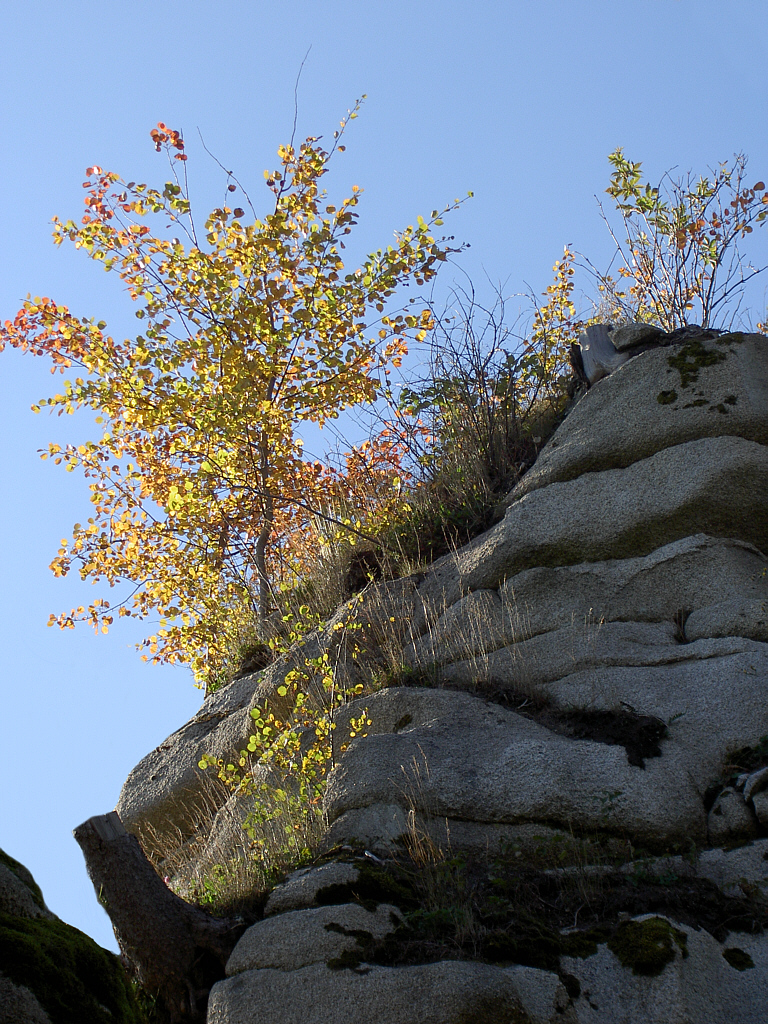
Granite rocks in the Steinwald

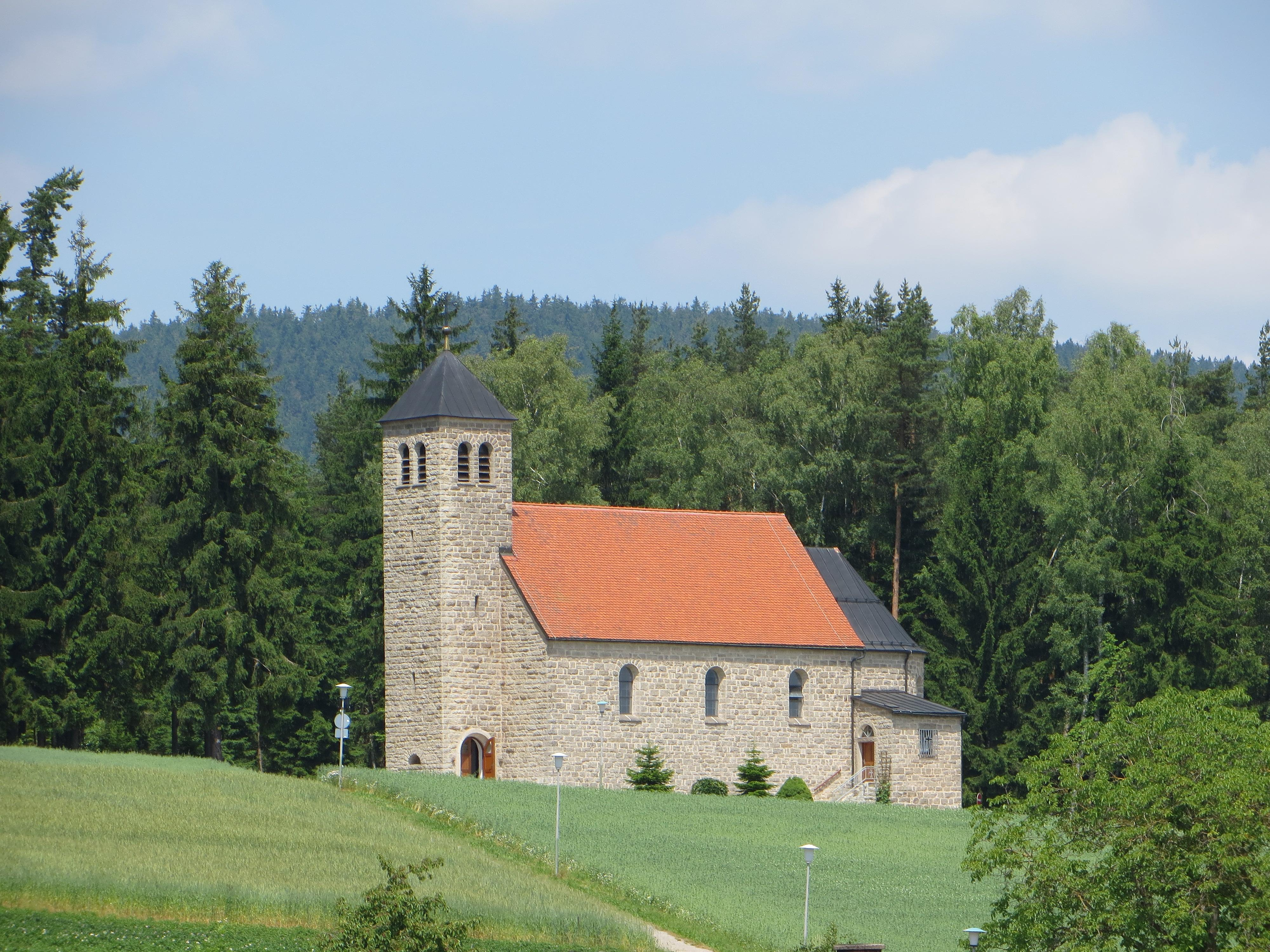
Steinwald church of St.Peter, Pfaben

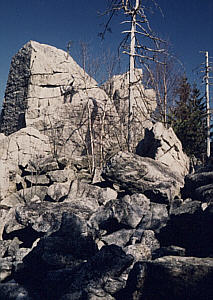
Granite rock formation of Zipfeltannen Rocks

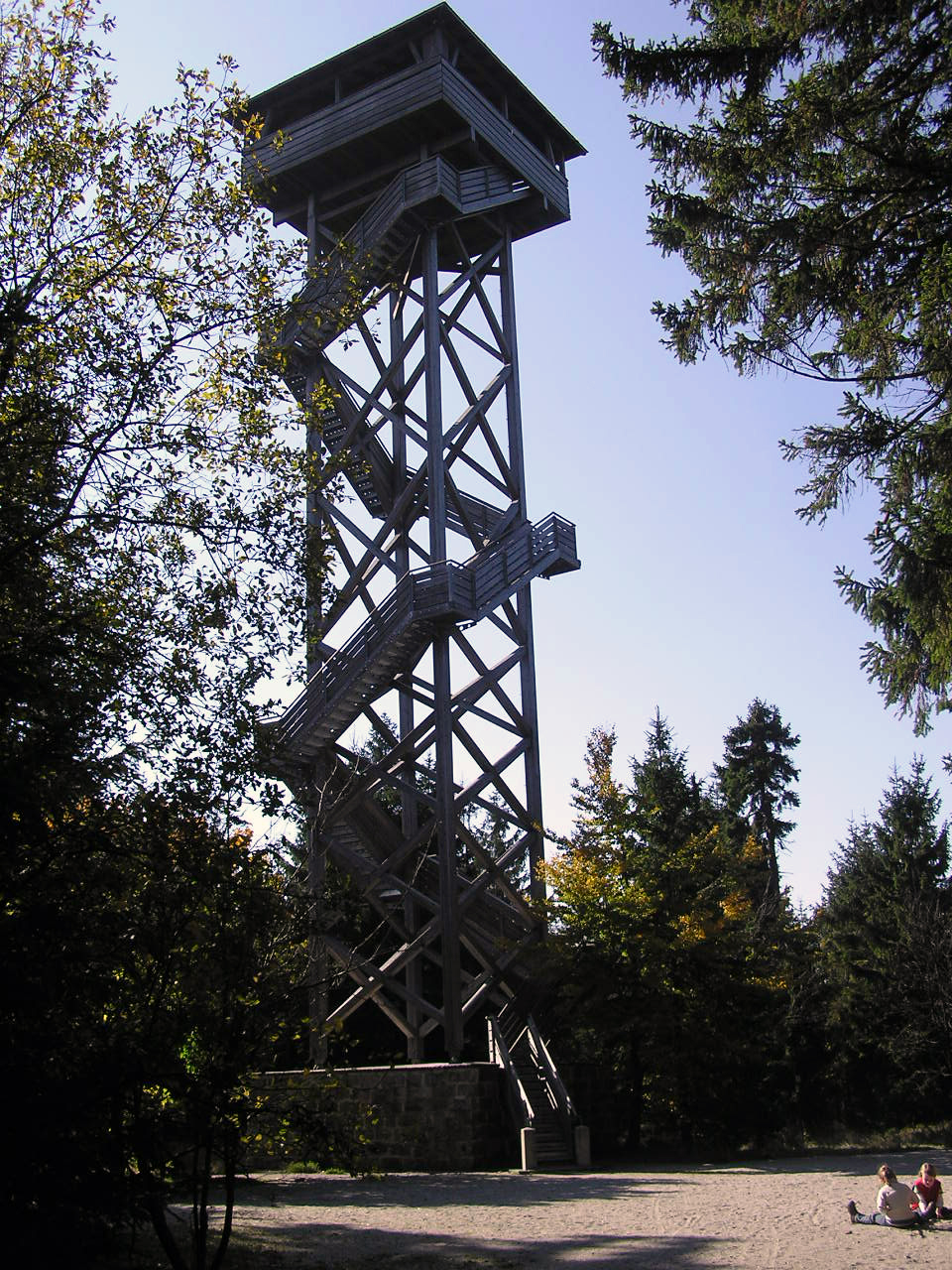
Upper Palatinate Tower

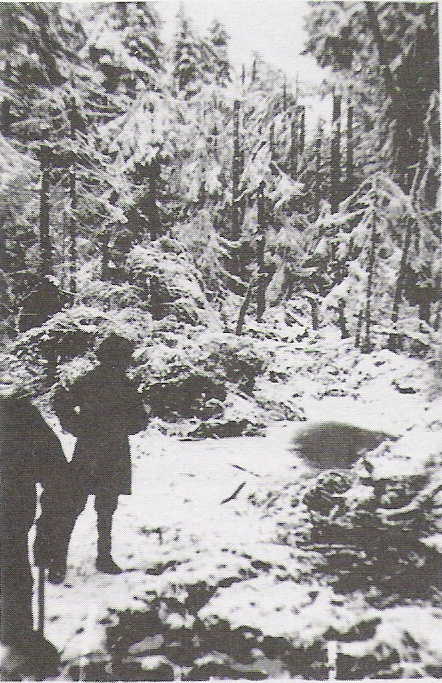
Disastrous breakage of trees under the weight of snow in the winter of 1927/1928

The Steinwald is a mountain range up to 946 m above sea level (NN) in southern Germany and, at the same time, a nature park (Steinwald Nature Park) founded in 1970 with an area of 246 square kilometres (95 sq mi) in the province of Upper Palatinate, in North Bavaria.

== Geography ==
=== Geographical location ===
The Steinwald lies south of the Upper Franconian county town of Marktredwitz and north of Erbendorf in the district of Tirschenreuth. The Steinwald is separated from the Fichtel Mountains to the northwest by the Waldershof trough (Waldershofer Senke) and from the Upper Palatine Forest to the southeast by the Waldnaab-Wondreb-trough.

=== Mountains and hills ===
The mountains and hills in the range and in the Steinwald Nature Park include the following − in order of height in metres (m) above sea level (NN):

- Platte (946 m) − with Upper Palatinate Tower
- Mountain of the Ruins of Weißenstein (863 m)
- Knock (845 m)
- Plößberg (820 m)
- Armesberg (731 m)
- Roßkopf (725 m)
- Steinberg (705 m)
- Großer Teichelberg (683 m)
- Vogelfelsen (485 m)

== Geology ==
Like the Fichtel Mountains, the Steinwald consists mainly of granite. In the south and east it is surrounded by a basalt landscape of Kuppen - gentle, rounded summits - (Kemnather Land, Nördlicher Steinwald), whose most striking elevations are the Parkstein near Weiden, the Rauhe Kulm near Kemnath, the Schlossberg near Waldeck, the Armesberg, the Teichelberg and the Ruheberg. Numerous granite blocks and rock 'bastions' are found in the Steinwald, often with fantastic shapes. They have odd names such as Katzentrögel, Zipfeltannenfelsen oder Saubadfelsen.

The Steinwald is still rich in precious stones, including for example agate and jasper, ore and rock types. Ores such as siderite, limonite and haematite occur too. These ores used to be mined, especially in the Middle Ages; today the remaining supplies are too small and too scattered to enable them to be extracted profitably.

The Steinwald is frequently seen as an extension of the Fichtel Mountains. But geological investigations have proved this to be wrong; the granite in the Steinwald is considerably softer than the Fichtel Mountains granite and, unlike the latter, contains no lithium. In addition it is younger than the Fichtel Mountains, as evinced by the numerous deposits of basalt and chalk. The Steinwald is also rich in springs. Water often bubbles out of rock crevices and has a good quality. It also has one of the most iron-rich springs in the whole of the Europe, the King Otto Spring in King-Otto-Bad near Wiesau, which is named after the brother of the Prince Regent Luitpold of Bavaria, Otto I of Greece. Even today the water is bottled by the firm of King-Otto-Sprudel.

The soil quality in the Steinwald depends on the dominant rock locally. Its extremely varied soils can be divided into about four types:

- From the rocks on the edge of the Steinwald (phyllite, quartzite, sands and kaolin clays), soils are formed that are predominantly acidic and poor in nutrients.
- The granite in the Steinwald has left behind mostly deep, weathered soils with medium levels of nutrients.
- Basalt weathering has formed tightly bordered soils with a good supply of nutrients.
- Other good soils are those affected by groundwater and dammed lakes, often accompanied by the formation of bogs.

== Climate ==
The climate in the Steinwald has Alpine characteristics. It is not snow-free until the middle of May. Giant snowdrifts and severe snow storms render paths and trails impassable in winter. A short spring follows the long and harsh winter; summer has more precipitation and is followed by a mild and fine autumn. Average annual temperatures lie between 4 and 5 °C, average precipitation is about 15 cm.

== Nature ==
The woods of the Steinwald consist mainly of conifers, with spruce as the dominant species. The proportion of deciduous trees has risen, however, from 25.1% in 1987 to 30.4% in 2002. Berry bushes provide much of the ground cover, especially blueberries and cranberries, and cryptogams - lichens and mosses - are widespread. The seven-petalled Arctic starflower, the symbol of the Fichtelgebirge Club, occurs here and ferns also abound in the woods.

Wild animals in the Steinwald, such as the red deer, wild boar, red fox, weasel, polecat, stoat and, more recently, the lynx, are almost only found in the more remote areas of woodland. Woodpeckers, goshawks, eagle-owls, tawny owls live in the high treetops, as do pygmy owls and the Tengmalm's owl. Enjoying special projection birds that would otherwise become rare such as the black storks and the capercaillie, which still occur in low numbers in the Steinwald.

=== Forest damage ===
The forest is exposed to many dangers. Chief among the concerns of forest owners and foresters is the almost annual weather damage:

- Wind and storm damage in the eastern Steinwald
- Rime and ice breakage in the highlands and
- Tree breakage under the weight of snow in the entire nature park area.

Dealing with damaged areas of the forest ties up a lot of effort and means that sometimes long-term forestry work suffers. On the other hand, the heavily thinned areas of forest result in a rapid transformation that helps to prevent attack by bark beetle.

For a good 20 years new forms of forest damage have appeared in the High Steinwald that go under the name of Waldsterben or forest dieback. Today the Steinwald in Northeast Bavaria is one of the main areas of concern. This is due to the high levels of sulphur dioxide emission from the burning of brown coal in the nearby Eger Basin, to acid rain and to the many days of mist and fog. The forest damage, which is clearly visible, has remained since 1986 at about the same level of 32%. Research to date has shown that its causes are complex and involve biotic and abiotic factors, however environmental pollution plays a significant role.

Forestry management measures include fertilising in order to counteract the lack of magnesium which causing a yellowing of the pine needles. So that no treeless steppes appear as on the heights of the Ore Mountains, the damaged highlands are planted. The Kemnath Forestry Department has done this on about 200 ha (490 acres).

== Walking ==
Many holidaymakers visit the Steinwald to go walking. The long-distance trails through the Steinwald are:

- The Burgenweg is marked with yellow-blue-yellow signs. It runs from Marktredwitz to the castle ruins of Weißenstein and continues on into the Upper Palatinate.
- The Goldsteig, a 600 kilometre long trail through the Upper Palatine Forest and Bavarian Forest, begins in the Steinwald. It runs past the ruins of Weißenstein Castle.
- The Steinwaldweg is marked with a red and white rectangle. It is one of the main hiking trails of the Fichtelgebirge Club and runs from the top of the Kösseine to the Platte and from there to the ruins of Weißenstein Castle. The end of the 38 kilometre long route is in Waldsassen.
- The Südweg, also a main hiking trail for the Fichtelgebirge Club, is marked by a black S on a yellow background, and runs from Neuenmarkt to the Armesberg. From here the 68 kilometre long trail runs past the Waldhaus to Wiesau, where it finishes.

From the walker's car park north of Pfaben an educational trail leads to some of the natural attractions of the Steinwald. In addition, there are circular walks starting from Friedenfels and Erbendorf. The High Steinwald may be reached on trails running from Neusorg, Waldershof, Marktredwitz, Poppenreuth, Fuchsmühl, Friedenfels and Erbendorf.

== See also ==
- List of nature parks in Germany

== Sources ==
- Steinwaldia Pullenreuth (Hrsg.): Wir am Steinwald, regelmäßig erscheinende Bücherrreihe im Verlag E. Bodner Pressath
- Steinwaldia Pullenreuth (Hrsg.): Aus dem Sagenschatz des Steinwaldes, 1978
- Hermann Braun: Im Banne der Berge - Sagen aus dem Sechsämter-, Stift- und Egerland, 1978
- Johann Baptist Lehner: Den Grenzbach entlang. Land und Leute am Steinwald., 1926, Reprint 1991, Verlag E. Bodner, Pressath, ISBN 3-926817-13-5
- Anton Schmidt: Wald- und Forstwirtschaft im Naturpark Steinwald, 1995 in "Oberpfälzer Heimat 39"
- Erich Schraml: The Walpoten in the Steinwald?, 1997 in "Der Siebenstern. Vereinszeitschrift des Fichtelgebirgsvereins 66"
- Harald Stark: Grenzkonflikte im Steinwald. Kurpfälzische Übergriffe auf die Herrschaft Weißenstein im 15. Jahrhundner, 1998 in Oberpfälzer Heimat 42
- Dietmar Herrmann: Der Hohe Steinwald im Fichtelgebirge in: Unser Fichtelgebirge 1/2008, p. 17-32

== Maps ==
- Fritsch Wanderkarte Nr. 52 nature park Fichtelgebirge, 1:50.000
- Bayerisches Landesvermessungsamt München, Topografische Karte 1:25.000, Steinwald Nature Park
