= Waldershof =

- Town
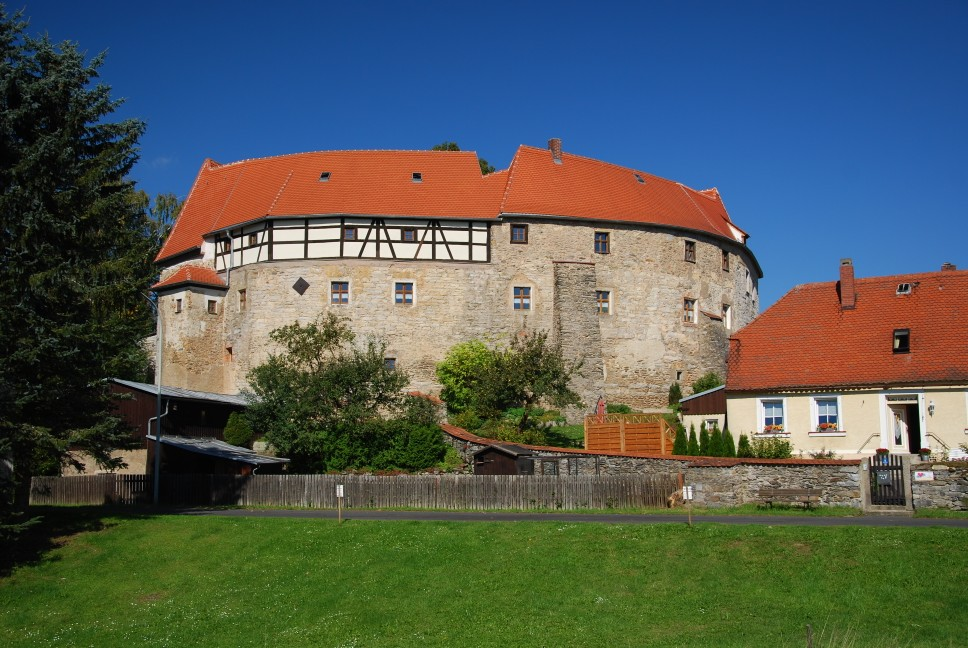
- Ganerbenburg Castle in Waldershof

- Coat of arms

- Location of Waldershof within Tirschenreuth district
- Interactive map of Waldershof
- Location within Germany Location within Bavaria
- Coordinates: 49°58′N 12°4′E
- Country: Germany
- State: Bavaria
- Admin. region: Oberpfalz
- District: Tirschenreuth
- Subdivisions: 26 Ortsteile

Government
  - Mayor (2020–26): Margit Bayer (CSU)

Area
  - Total: 60.37 km^{2} (23.31 sq mi)
- Elevation: 546 m (1,791 ft)

Population (2025-12-31)
  - Total: 4,300
  - Density: 71/km^{2} (180/sq mi)
- Time zone: UTC+01:00 (CET)
  - Summer (DST): UTC+02:00 (CEST)
- Postal codes: 95679
- Dialling codes: 09231
- Vehicle registration: TIR
- Website: www.waldershof.de

Waldershof (German pronunciation: [ˈvaldɐsˌhoːf]; Bavarian: Waltershuaf) is a town in the district of Tirschenreuth, in Bavaria, Germany. It is situated 22 km northwest of Tirschenreuth, and 3 km southwest of Marktredwitz.

== Geography ==
The 60 square kilometer City of Waldershof is bounded on the North by the City of Marktredwitz. The boundary line between the two cities is also the border for the counties of Tirschenreuth and Wunsiedel as well as the regional zones of the Upper Palatinate and Upper Franconia.

Since the completion of the municipality reform, the population has grown to approximately 5,000 inhabitants. Due to their locations, the unincorporated portions of the community qualify as vacation spots, this is especially true for Shurbach, Kossain and Rodenzenreuth which are found at base of the Kossaine and Hohenhard, Poppenreuth and Helmbrechts which are situated on the north side of the Steinwald. These locations are ideal launching spots for extensive hiking and for participation in winter sports.

== Climate ==
Most parts of Waldershof belong to the nature park Steinwald. The climate is unique to this region and has Alpine characteristics. Area's near or in the forest are sometimes not snow-free until the middle of May. Giant snowdrifts and severe snow storms render paths and trails impassable in winter. A short spring follows the long and harsh winter; summer has more precipitation and is followed by a mild and fine autumn. Frost is expected until Pentecost. Average annual temperatures lie between 4 and 5 °C, average precipitation is about 15 cm.

== History ==
The first documented reference to the town of “Waltershove” can be found in a certificate from July 1, 1263, that was written in Latin. The certificate is part of the registry of deeds from the Waldsassen monastery and is currently preserved in the main city archives of Munich. This document shows Count Friedrich von Leuchtenberg (bei Weiden/Opf.), with the agreement of his brother Gebhardt, transferred ownership of the castle in Waldershof which he occupied to the monastery in Waldsassen. The castle was built in 1100 and served as the starting point for the settlement. The builder remains unknown. In 1463, Abbot Nikolaus IV of Waldsassen granted the village of Waldershof market rights. The castle and market continued to belong to the monastery of Waldsassen until secularization in 1802.

The present look of the castle provides only an incomplete view of the original size and appearance. This huge building was covered by a pond and creek in the east as well as the south and by ringwalls on the north side. The massive, 1823 ablated watchtower at the northeast corner of the castle gave a wide view into the valley of Waldershof.

The “Markt Waldershof” was pulled into the industrial age in 1907 with the construction of the Haviland porcelain factory. At times, this important industry employed over 1,000 workers. Through modernization and streamlining the workforce was greatly reduced. Since 1937, the business has been owned by the Rosenthal Corporation. The oldest business in the city is the saw mill. It was founded in 1885 by master builder August Mayer. The ownership of the business was transferred through inheritance to the family Shug. At the conclusion of World War II, many refugees found new homes in Waldershof. By 1949 existing local construction cooperatives were quickly building living quarters.

In 1963, Henrich Junker, then the Bavarian Minister of State, gave Waldershof the title of “Stadt” (city). Today, the City of Waldershof is an industrial community. For hundreds of years, tradesmen and craftsmen have given the people work and bread.

Private housing construction also flourished. As the population grew, manufacturing companies related to sheet metal products, clothing, tools and vehicle engineering followed.

Since the completion of the municipality reform, the community of Waldershof extends from the Koesseine to the southern edge of the Steinwald.

A new City Hall was built in 1983.

Beginning in the nineties Waldershof decided once more to open up new ground for more private housing quarters. The city extended its living quarters for 3 times since.

In 2014 the city council approved the demolishment of the old porcelain factory which followed a year later. This old manufacturing facility dominated the skyline of Waldershof for more than a century. Meanwhile, bicycle manufacture CUBE extended its headquarters in the town of Waldershof, where it also decided to build its logistic center. It is located near the former porcelain facility.

== Economy ==
=== Infrastructure ===
Waldershof is located on the train line Nuremberg-Eger and is only 3 kilometers away from the Marktredwitz train station. Through the local network of roads, Waldershof is connected to interstate highway A 93, state roads 2170, 2177 and county road TIR 17.

=== Water supply ===
Marktredwitz and Waldershof share a common public water supply and waste water treatment facility. Following the war, Waldershof invested millions of German Marks (DM) in the infrastructure.

=== Companies ===
The 1993 founded bicycle manufacturer CUBE is headquartered in Waldershof. CUBE sells their products into 60 countries.

=== Public facilities ===
- Kösseinebad (public swimming pool)
- 2 Kindergartens
- Elementary and primary school

== Places of interest ==
=== Buildings ===
- Castle of Waldershof (Waldershofer Schloss)
- Castle ruin Weißenstein (Burgruine Weißenstein) built and extended in the 14th and 15th century
- Old catholic church St. Sebastian rebuilt between 1818 - 1820
- The Upper Palatinate Tower (Oberpfalzturm) is an observation tower on the 946 metres (3,104 ft) high Platte mountain, the highest peak in the Steinwald and in Northern Upper Palatinate.
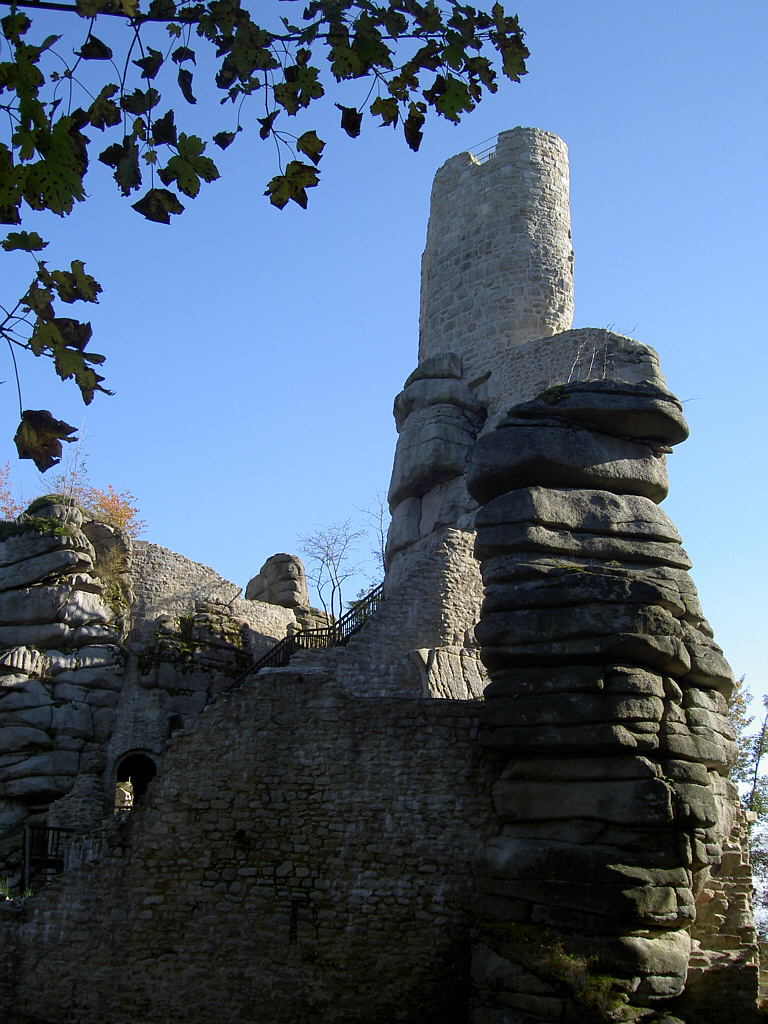
Castle ruin Weißenstein

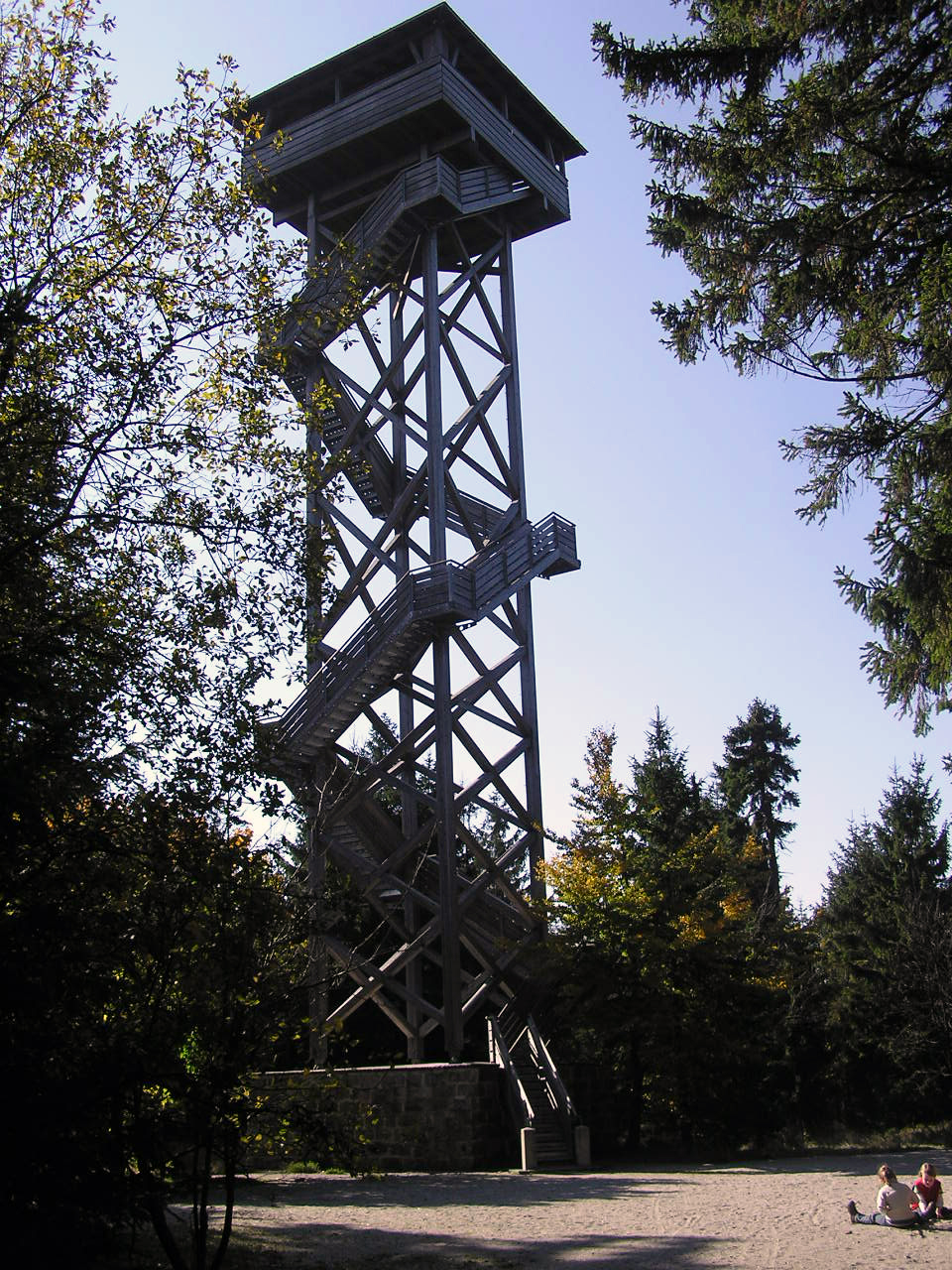
The Upper Palatinate Tower

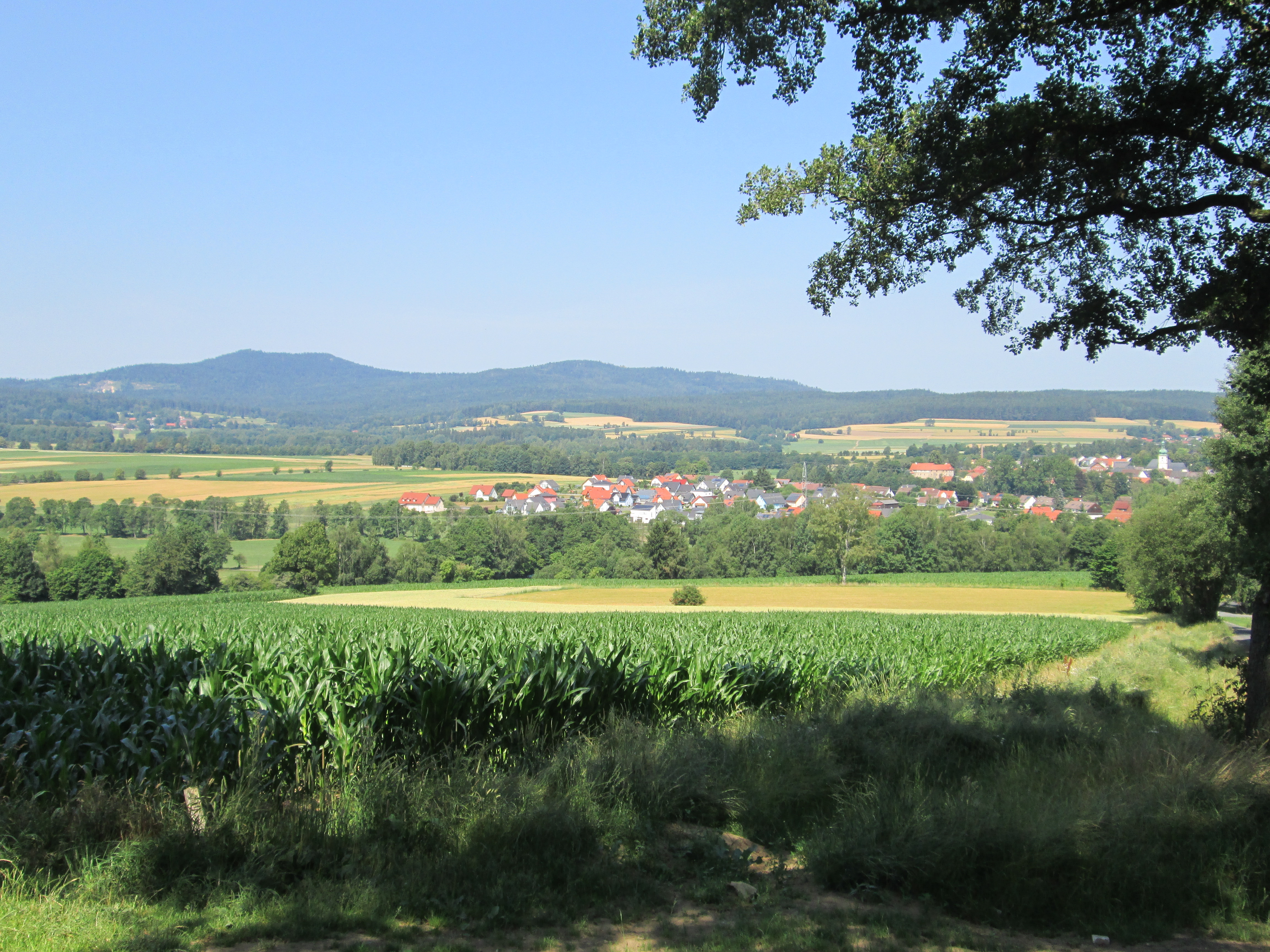
View across the valley of Waldershof to the Fichtel Mountains

=== Nature parks ===
- Steinwald
- Fichtel Mountains (Fichtelgebirge)

== Clubs and associations ==
Waldershof is known for their numerous clubs and associations, provide many opportunities for sport and social encounters in every city precinct. The city has 8 volunteer fire departments.

== Literature ==
Zeitler, Walther. (Ed.). (1988). Heimatbuch der Stadt Waldershof. Amberg, Bavaria, Germany: Vereinigte Oberpfaelzische Druckereien und Verlagsanstalt Gmbh, Translated by: Walter Swett
