= UPT =

UPT and Upt can stand for:

- United Paramount Theaters
- Universal Personal Telecommunications
- University of Pittsburgh at Titusville
- University of the Philippines Tacloban
- Unlimited Paenga Tawhiti, secondary school in Christchurch City, New Zealand
- Unpenttrium, a hypothetical chemical element in the extended periodic table with the temporary symbol Upt
- Upper Palatinate Tower, an observation tower
- Uptown New Orleans
- Upton Park Trophy, Channel Islands cup one-off match held between the champions of Guernsey's Priaulx League and Jersey's Football Combination
- Upton railway station, UK railway station code
- Universitatea Politehnica, din Timişoara (Polytechnic University of Timișoara), Romania
- Universidade Portucalense Infante D. Henrique (UPT), Portugal
