= Cube Action Team =

German mountain bike racing team

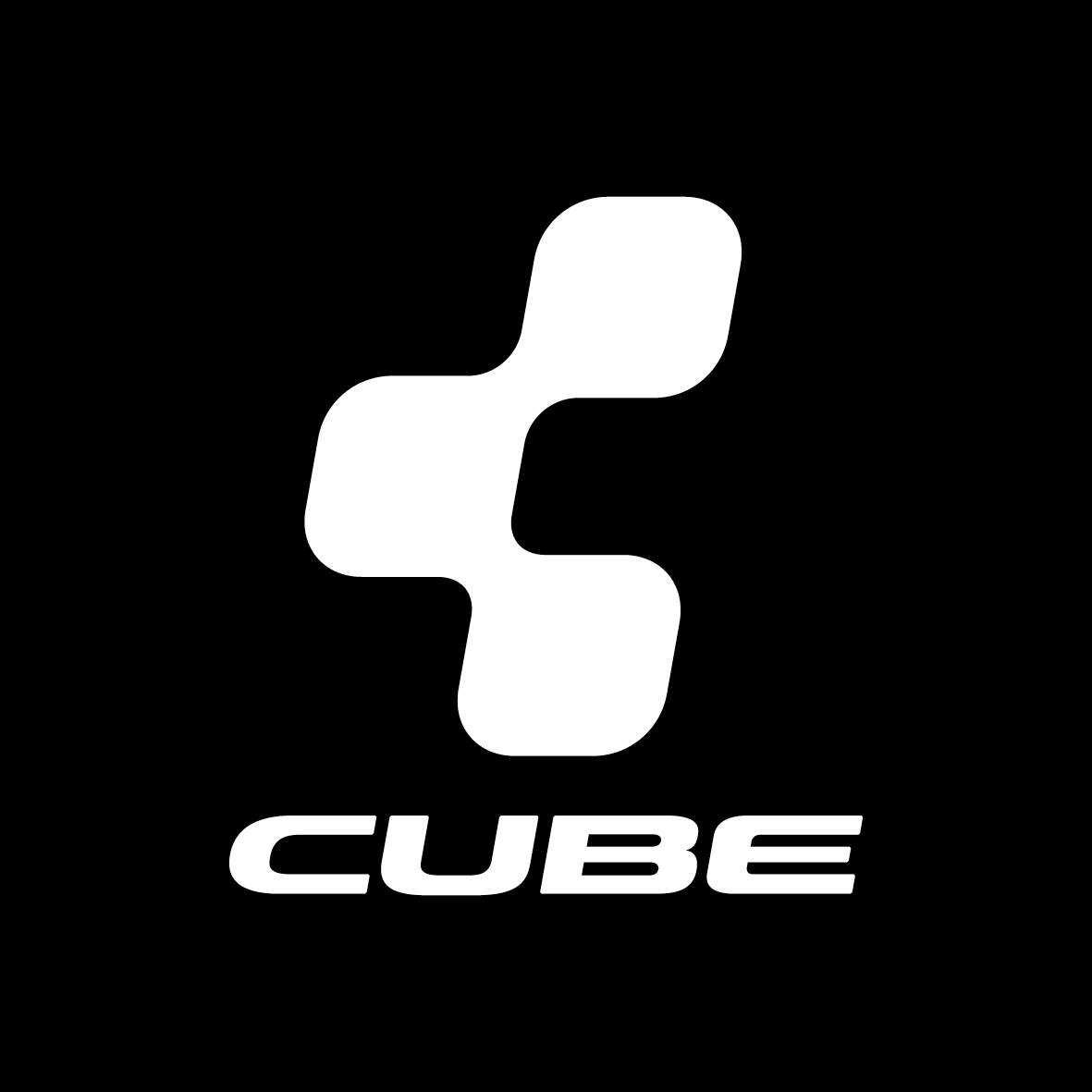

Team information
- Registered: Germany
- Founded: 2011
- Discipline: Mountain bike
- Bicycles: Cube Bikes

Key personnel
- Team manager: Claus Wachsmann

Team name history
- 2011–: Cube Action Team

Cube Action Team, is a professional mountain bike racing team competing in the World Cup and World Champs, as well as national level events, in the enduro category.

== 2015 Team roster ==
Rider	Date of birth
Nico Lau (FRA)	April 1, 1989 (age 37)
André Wagenknecht (GER)	February 9, 1979 (age 47)
Gusti Wildhaber (SUI)	September 7, 1988 (age 37)
Ludwig Döhl (GER)	March 2, 1990 (age 36)
Scott Laughland (SCO)	March 1, 1990 (age 36)
Greg Callaghan (IRE)	January 1, 1992 (age 34)
