= Kösseine =

Große Kösseine
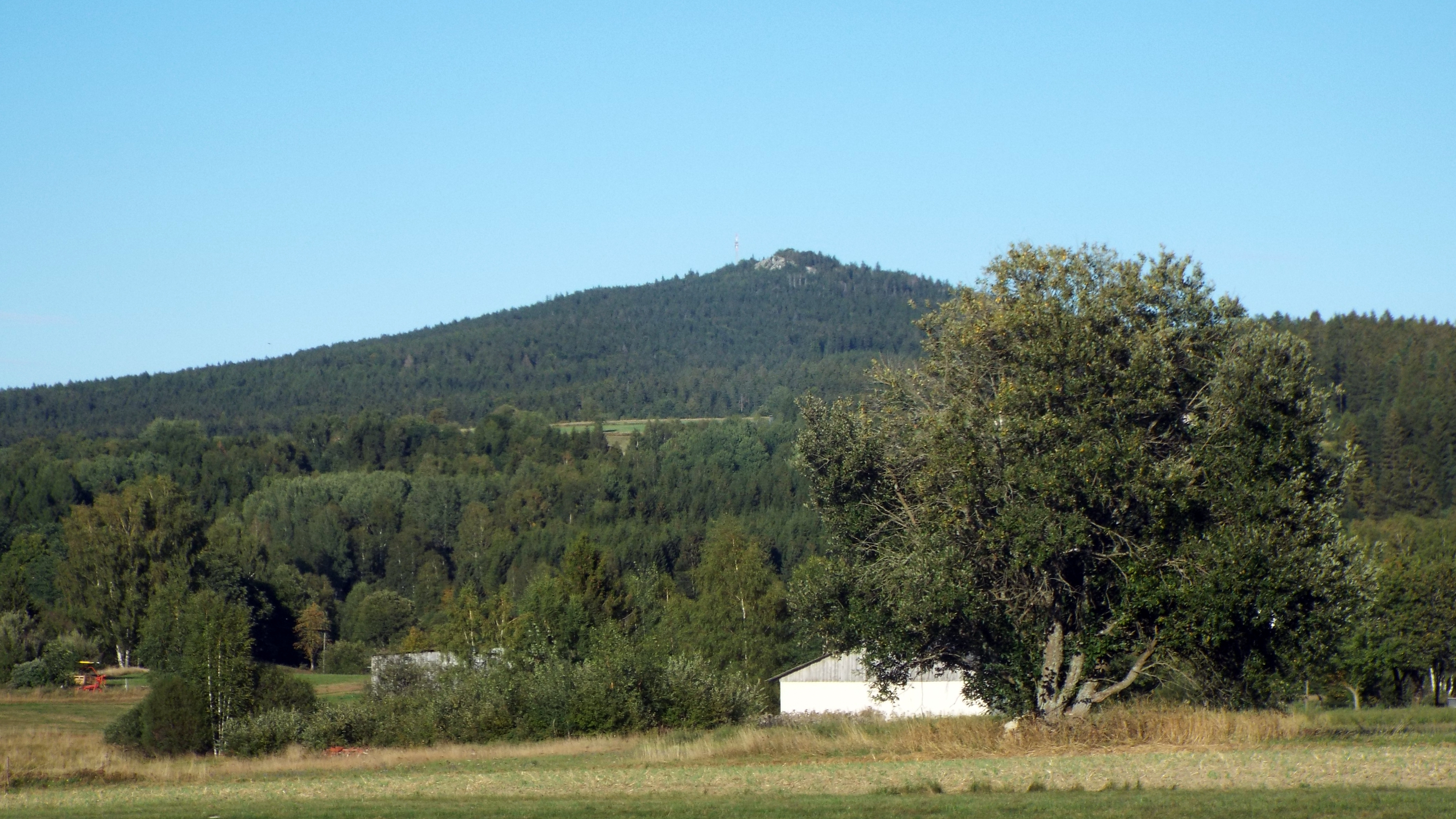
- The Kösseine seen from Nagel

Highest point
- Elevation: 939 m above sea level (NN) (3,081 ft)
- Coordinates: 49°59′19″N 11°58′49″E

Geography
- Location within Bavaria
- Location: Bavaria, Germany
- Parent range: Fichtel Mountains

Geology
- Rock type: granite

The Kösseine is a massif in the High Fichtel mountains in Germany, lying in northeast Bavaria south of Wunsiedel. The highest elevation of this granite massif is the summit of the Große Kösseine, 939 m above sea level (NN). The border between the Bavarian provinces of Upper Franconia and Upper Palatinate runs over the Kösseine as does the European watershed between the North Sea and the Black Sea. Around the Kösseine are the settlements of Wunsiedel, Marktredwitz, Bad Alexandersbad, Waldershof, Hohenhard, Neusorg, Brand, Ebnath, Nagel and Tröstau, tourist resorts within the Fichtel Mountains.

On the Kösseine rises an eponymous stream (officially called the Kössein), which flows through Waldershof and Marktredwitz before discharging into the Rösla, a tributary of the Ohře, near Seußen.

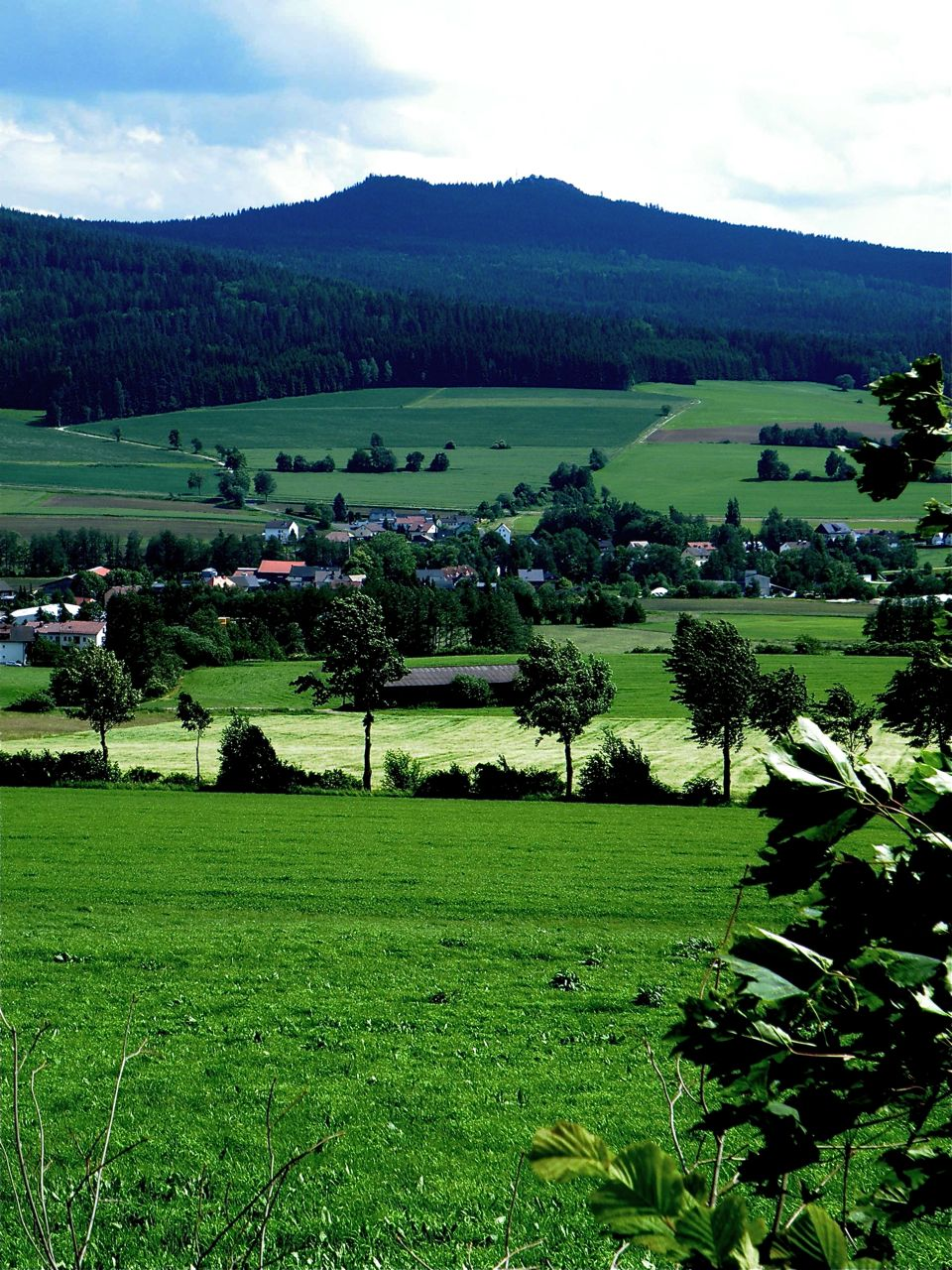
The Kösseine seen from Hildenbach

== Conservation and natural monuments ==
In the vicinity of the Große Kösseine peak is a large granite blockfield with an area of 15.8 hectares (39 acres) which has been placed under protection. Various rock formations (the Kleine Kösseine, the Großer and Kleiner Haberstein, the Burgsteinfelsen, Mühlstein, Püttnersfel and Jakobifels) are protected natural monuments. The view of the twin peaks of Kleine and Große Kösseine (Little and Great Kösseine), visible from almost all sides, is quite striking.

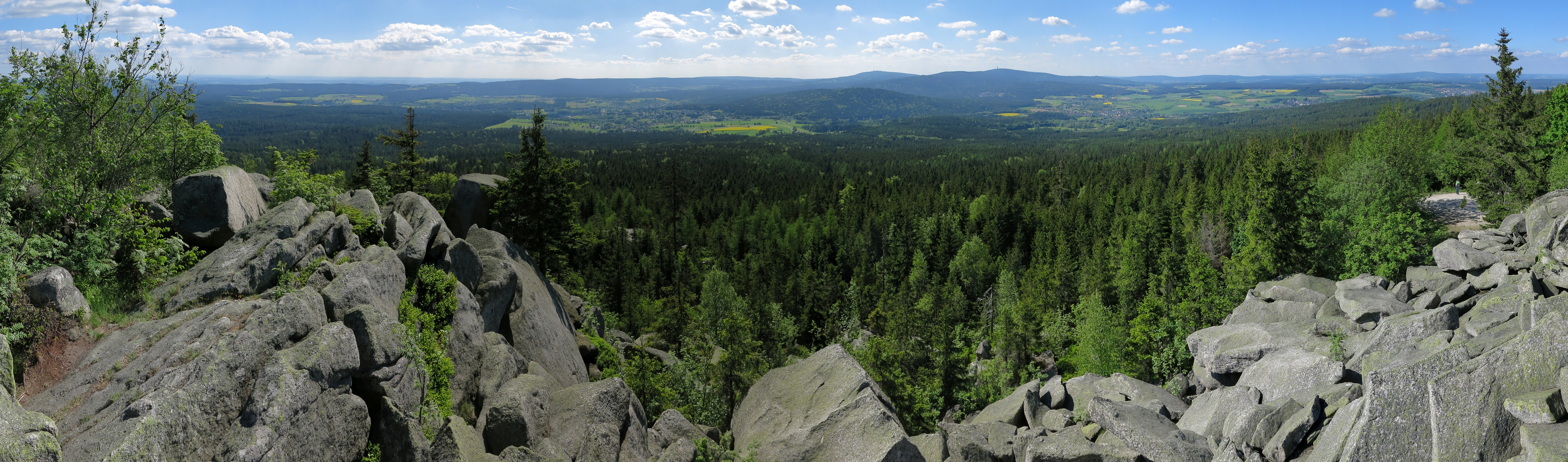
View from the summit of Kösseine into the High Fichtel mountains

== History and famous visitors ==
The Kösseine was first mentioned in the records on 7 March 1283, when large parts of the Kösseine (Choezsin) were transferred to Duke Louis the Strict, Count Palatine of Rhine and Duke of Bavaria. From 1542 (Caspar Bruschius: Des Vichtelbergs gründtliche Beschreibung) to the present day the mountain appeared in all local geographical and historical books and was famous for its outstanding views. By the 15th century its thick woods were already a favourite hunting ground of the Bayreuth margraves, and the forests supplied wood for construction and fuel to the surrounding villages. Granite quarrying began in the same century.

In 1785 and 1820 Johann Wolfgang von Goethe came to the Fichtel Mountains. He wrote scientific treatises about granite weathering and made sketches of the various rock formations in the Kösseine area.

Because of its clear, far-reaching views in all directions of the compass (to the Bavarian Forest, Rhön, Thuringian Forest and Ore Mountains) the mountain has long been a popular destination. Its fame rose considerably as a result of the visit of the nobility from 13 June 1805 to 5 July 1805 and who stayed in (Bad) Alexandersbad. On 17 June 1805 Frederick William III of Prussia and his wife Louise as well as a large entourage rode out to the Kösseine. Many newspapers reported the event and spread the mountain's renown.

== Structures on the summit ==
In 1805 the first primitive shelter was erected and, in 1833, another one. In 1882 the Fichtelgebirge Section of the German-Austrian Alpine Club (forerunner of the Fichtelgebirge Club) built a timber refuge hut with food for hikers. Due to the constantly rising number of visitors a permanent house was called for which was finally opened in 1903 after a long preparations and which was considerable extended in the years that followed. In 1924 a stone observation tower, the Kösseine Tower (Kösseineturm), was built to replace the wooden towers. Both house and tower belong to the Fichtelgebirge Club. The house, built of Kösseine Granite and leased, offers accommodation and food all year round.

From 1998 to 2000 the Kösseinehaus was fully renovated, so that it now has all the modern facilities of an inn. The forest road to the house is out-of-bounds to private vehicles, so it can only be reached on foot. The Kösseinehaus is on the network of main hiking trails maintained by the Fichtelgebirge Club; it lies directly next to the High Way and is well used by walkers.
The volunteer workers of the Fichtelgebirge Club have laid out 13 marked hiking trails of varying lengths from all directions to the summit of the Kösseine. The surrounding villages include the Kösseine as a local attraction in their advertising brochures.

== Culture and Kösseine Granite ==
The mountain hut on the Kösseine has been a venue for folk musicians for a long time who, at regular intervals, play authentic folk music. Folk evenings, too, enjoy great popularity. Near the Kösseinehaus there is a large, wooden cross and a stone altar; mountaintop services on Ascension Day and other special occasions are a tradition here.

Kösseine Granite, which is a blue granite that is unique in Europe, is also called Kleinwendern Granite or Schurbach Granite and occurs near Schurbach and Kleinwendern. It also occurs in a narrow band at the Luisenburg Rock Labyrinth north of the Kösseine that runs eastwards. Only the eastern part of the lower rock labyrinth consists of Kösseine Granite, the western part is made of Dach Granite. Kösseine Granite is quarried today only near Waldershof in the district of Tirschenreuth.

== Sources ==
The Fichtelgebirgsverein (publ.): The Kösseine in the Fichtelgebirge, Issue 3/1993 in the series The Fichtelgebirge. New revised, edition, 2005.
