= Holger Grießhammer =

German politician (born 1982)

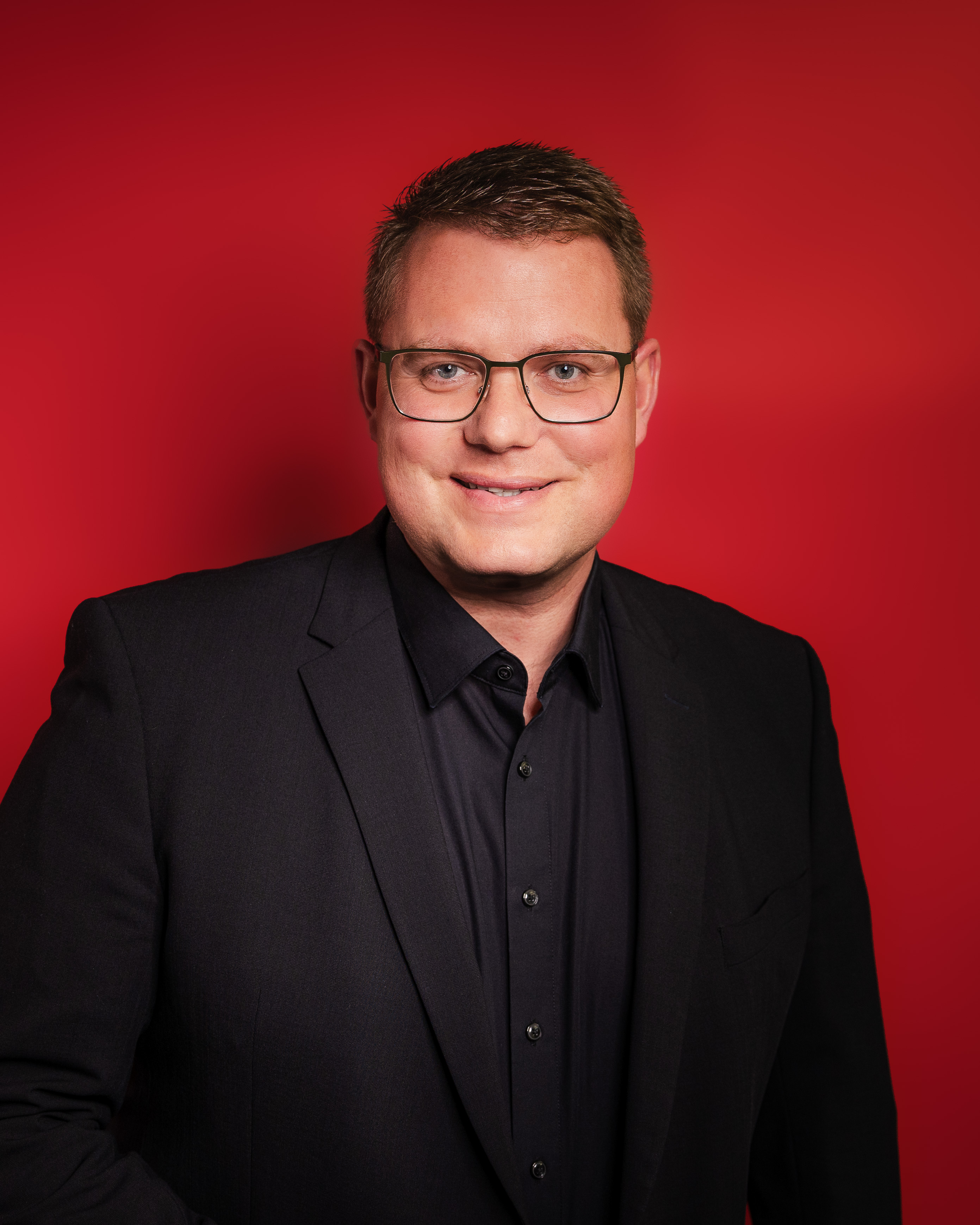
- Grießhammer in 2025

Member of the Landtag of Bavaria
- Incumbent
- Assumed office 30 October 2023

Personal details
- Born: 9 April 1982 (age 44) Marktredwitz
- Party: Social Democratic Party (since 2000)

Holger Grießhammer (born 9 April 1982 in Marktredwitz) is a German politician serving as a member of the Landtag of Bavaria since 2023. He has served as group leader of the Social Democratic Party since 2024.
