= Schneekirche =

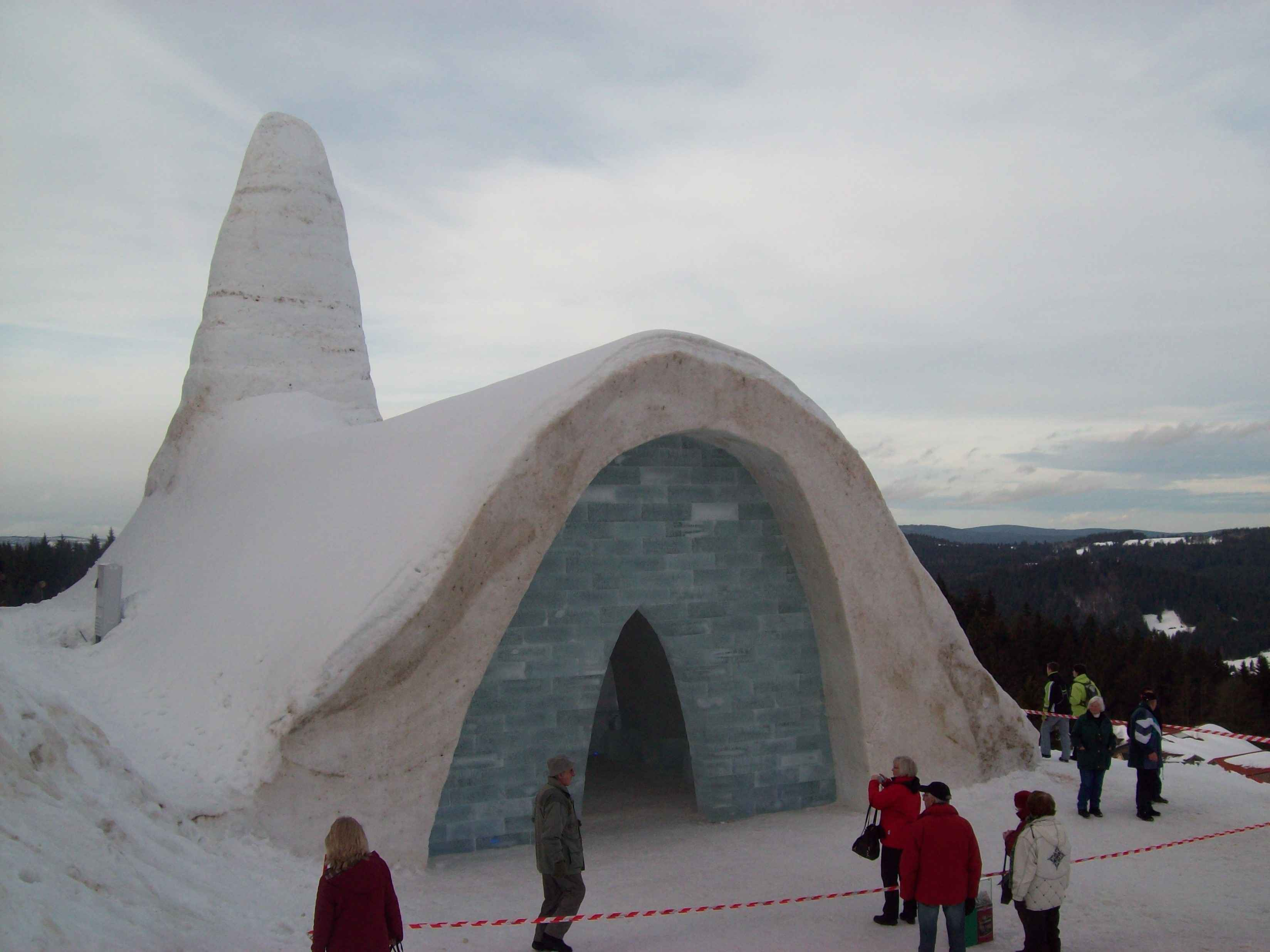
- Schneekirche
- 48.8930°N 13.6477°E
- Location: Mitterfirmiansreut, Germany

The Schneekirche is a church made annually from snow in Mitterfirmiansreut, in the district of Freyung-Grafenau in Bavaria, Germany.

== History ==
In 1911, a group of villagers in Mitterfirmiansreut got the idea to build a snow church in protest that the church officials did not give them money to build one. The 1910–1911 winter had left a lot of snow, so they went to work in February. Men and women worked to cut out snow blocks for their church. The finished ice church was 14m long, 7m wide and 4m high. The first worship was held on 28 March 1911. The church gained attention internationally, and the group began to receive donations for construction of a stone church.

== Present day ==
The villagers decided to build another snow church to commemorate the one hundredth anniversary of that church in 2011. However, they ran into a lack of snow and they were not able to make it to their hoped Christmas opening, but instead opened at the end of the year. In the early stage, Catholic leaders expressed skepticism, and the local Bishop refused to consecrate it. Eventually the new ice church was built.

It was planned by architect Alfons Doeringer. It cost €100,000, or US $200,000 to build, using 1,400 cubic meters (49,000 cubic feet) of snow and slabs of ice. The dimensions were 26 meters long and 11 meters wide with a 17-meter tower and there was space to seat 190 people. Blue lighting elements were built into the ice, to enhance its appearance.

Even before the building was completed, there was a number of requests for baptisms and weddings. The nearby Catholic Bishop of Passau, Wilhelm Schraml, initially ruled out masses, baptisms or weddings from being held at the church for theological reasons; worship services were allowed to be held and the church was consecrated by the local dean, Kajetan Steinbeißer.

Before it melted, it was nicknamed "God's Igloo" by the Spiegel newspaper.
