= Ersen Martin =

Turkish footballer (1979–2024)

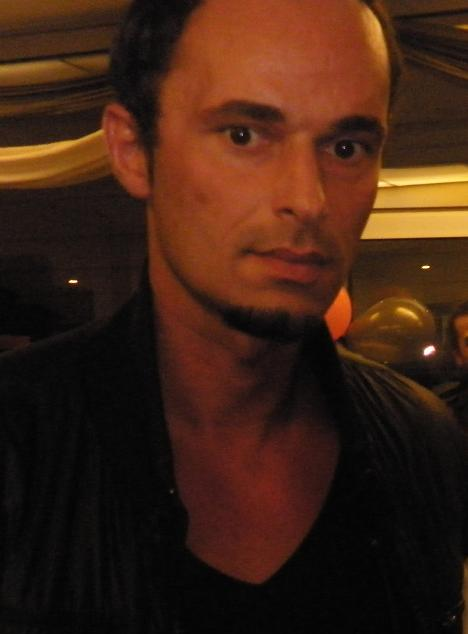
- Martin in 2012

Personal information
- Date of birth: 23 May 1979
- Place of birth: Marktredwitz, Bavaria, West Germany
- Date of death: 19 March 2024 (aged 44)
- Place of death: İzmir, Turkey
- Height: 1.96 m (6 ft 5 in)
- Position: Forward

Youth career
- –1996: Baiersdorfer SV
- 1996–1998: 1. FC Nürnberg

Senior career*
Years	Team	Apps	(Gls)
1998–1999	1. FC Nürnberg	1	(0)
1999–2000	Beşiktaş	18	(2)
2000–2001	Siirtspor	21	(8)
2001–2002	Göztepe	28	(7)
2002–2005	Denizlispor	87	(30)
2005–2006	Ankaraspor	29	(6)
2006–2007	Trabzonspor	28	(12)
2007–2009	Recreativo	25	(3)
2009	Sivasspor	11	(0)
2010	Manisaspor	5	(0)
2010–2011	Kasımpaşa	29	(8)
2012	Gençlerbirliği	4	(0)
2012–2013	Eyüpspor	16	(3)
Total		302	(79)

International career
2000–2001	Turkey U21	3	(0)
2003–2006	Turkey A2	5	(3)
2004–2006	Turkey	3	(0)
- * Club domestic league appearances and goals

Ersen Martin (23 May 1979 – 19 March 2024) was a Turkish professional footballer who played as a forward. He amassed a total of 256 games and 73 goals in the Süper Lig over the course of 12 seasons, representing ten different clubs.

== Club career ==
Born in Marktredwitz, West Germany, Ersen started playing for 1. FC Nürnberg. He made his Bundesliga debut in a 1–0 away loss against SC Freiburg in 1998–99 season, playing the final 20 minutes. After that sole season he switched to Turkey, going on to represent Beşiktaş, Siirtspor, Göztepe, Denizlispor and Ankaraspor.

In the 2006–07 campaign, Ersen represented Trabzonspor, finishing the season as the league's eighth best-scorer and helping his team finish fourth, good enough for qualification to the UEFA Cup. Subsequently, he had everything arranged with La Liga club Recreativo de Huelva in August 2007, but the deal eventually collapsed and he stayed at Trabzonspor; in October, FIFA stepped in and declared Ersen a player of the Spanish side– he had dual citizenship, but that status changed with 2007 changes in German laws and so, he eventually played his first season for the Andalusians as a foreign player.

On 3 February 2008, Ersen made his Recreativo debut in a 2–1 loss to Sevilla, during which was sent off for a reckless challenge after just eight minutes as a substitute. On 27 April he got his first start and scored his first goal for Recre, also assisting Javier Camuñas in a 2–0 home win that sent Levante to the second division.

On 1 July 2009, Ersen signed a two-year deal with Sivasspor, ending speculation he would be joining Scotland's Heart of Midlothian. On 4 August he netted his first competitive goal for the club, in the third qualifying round of the UEFA Champions League: on the 12th minute of the second leg against Anderlecht he scored the team's first ever in the competition, in a 3–1 home victory (6–3 loss on aggregate).

After a poor first half of 2009–10, Ersen switched to Manisaspor. Overall, he finished the year with no goals and his teams ranked just above the relegation zone (15th and 14th).

== International career ==
Ersen received his first cap for the Turkey national team on 18 August 2004, in a 2–1 friendly home loss to Belarus. He appeared in a further two internationals two years later, also in exhibition games.

== Personal life and death ==
Martin's younger brother, Erkan, was also a footballer. Martin suffered an aortic rupture in May 2022 and remained hospitalised until his death on 19 March 2024, at the age of 44.

== Honors ==
Turkey B

- Future Team Cup: 2004–05
