= Armesberg =

Mountain in Germany

Highest point
- Elevation: 732 m (2,402 ft)
- Prominence: 142 m (466 ft)
- Coordinates: 49°53′26″N 11°56′45″E

Geography
- Location: Bavaria, Germany

Armesberg is a basalt mountain in the Steinwald, near Kulmain in northeastern Bavaria, Germany. It stands at 732 m (2,402 ft). There is a pilgrimage church on its summit.
