= Reinhard Pöllath =

German businessman and lawyer (born 1948)

Reinhard Pöllath (born January 15, 1948) is a German businessman and lawyer. He is the chairman of Beiersdorf.

== Early life and education ==
Reinhard Pöllath was born in 1948. He grew up in Upper Franconia, where his family has run a joinery since the 17th century. He graduated from high school in Marktredwitz in 1967. After completing his military service, he studied law from 1969 to 1973 at the University of Regensburg and LMU Munich. Subsequently, he held a scholarship from the Studienstiftung, with whose support he graduated with a master's degree from the Harvard Law School in 1974. In 2006, he obtained a doctorate degree.

== Career ==
In 1977, he was admitted as a lawyer and worked first as a lawyer in Munich, Frankfurt am Main, and Berlin. Until 1993, he was a partner at a law firm in Munich and until 1997, managing director of a real estate and hotel company.

In 1997, together with six partners, he started the law firm P+P Pöllath + Partners. He specialized in advising family businesses, corporate acquisitions, tax law, foundations and trusts. Pöllath has advised clients, including the Harald Quandt family. In 2012, the law firm had offices in Munich, Berlin and Frankfurt. Pöllath became known as an advisor to the Herz family, which appointed him interim chief executive officer of Tchibo Holding AG, in 2002. One year later, he was nominated as chairman of the supervisory board. In 2007, he took over management of Brost Holding, which held 50 percent of the Funke Mediengruppe.

== Other affiliations ==
Pöllath is an honorary professor at the University of Münster's institute of tax law.

He is on the boards of SinnerSchrader, Woolworth GmbH, BonVenture, TA Triumph-Adler, and Beiersdorf. He was chairman of the board of Escada.

Pöllath is a member of the council for the Lindau Nobel Laureate Meetings.

== Engelhorn tax affair ==
In 2013, Pöllath was put into investigative custody for nine days, following suspicions of aiding in the evasion of gift taxes in the amount of up to Euro 440 million by the pharmaceutical billionaire Curt Engelhorn, whose assets Pöllath managed. The tax rebate negotiated with the authorities by the Engelhorn family is said to amount to around Euro 135 million.

== Awards ==
The asteroid 7448 Pöllath, which was discovered on the day before his birth, was named after him. Pöllath was awarded the Order of Merit of the Federal Republic of Germany, first class.
