= Stefan Oster =

German Catholic prelate (born 1965)

His Excellency Stefan Oster S.D.B.
- Bishop of Passau
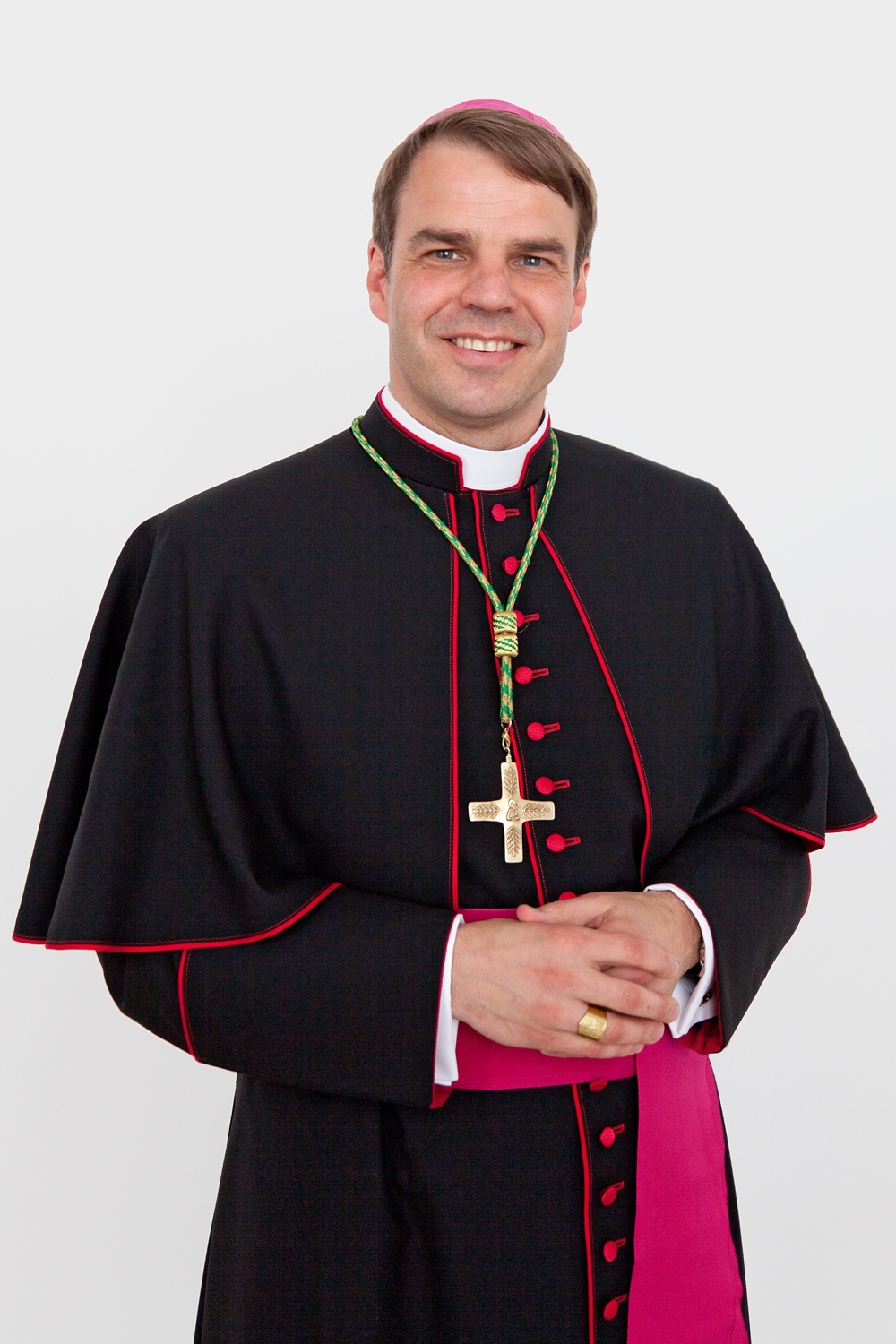
- Church: Catholic Church; Latin Church
- Diocese: Passau
- Appointed: 4 April 2014
- Installed: 24 May 2014
- Predecessor: Wilhelm Schraml

Personal details
- Born: 3 June 1965 (age 61) Amberg, Bavaria, Germany
- Motto: Victoria Veritatis Caritas (Latin for 'The victory of truth is love')
- Coat of arms: Stefan Oster's coat of arms

Ordination history
History
Priestly ordination
- Ordained by: Viktor Josef Dammertz
Episcopal consecration
- Principal consecrator: Reinhard Marx
- Co-consecrators: Wilhelm Schraml, Alois Kothgasser

Stefan Oster S.D.B. (born 3 June 1965) is a German prelate of the Catholic Church who has served as the Latin Church bishop of Passau in Germany since 2014.

== Early life ==
Oster was born on 3 June 1965 in Amberg, a town in Bavaria, Germany. He graduated from Neutraubling high school and trained as a newspaper and radio editor from 1984 to 1986. He spent some years working in this profession. In 1988 he started his studies in philosophy, history and religious studies in Regensburg, Kiel, at Keele University and the University of Oxford. From 1990 to 1991 he was a fellow in the Erasmus Programme of the European Union. He graduated from Oxford in 1993 with a Master of Studies and a Master of Arts from Regensburg in 1994.

In 1995, Oster joined the Salesians of Don Bosco and spent a year in their novitiate in Jünkerath. From 1996 to 2000 he studied at the College of Philosophy and Theology in Benediktbeuern. On 24 July 1999 he made his perpetual vows and became a member of the Salesians of Don Bosco. He was ordained a priest by Viktor Josef Dammertz, bishop of Augsburg, on 24 June 2001.

== Academic work ==
In 2003, Oster received the Albertus Magnus prize from the Diocese of Augsburg and in 2004 the Vereins der Freunde from the University of Augsburg for his doctoral thesis. He started lecturing philosophy at the College of Philosophy and Theology in Benediktbeuern. His subjects were the theory of knowledge, metaphysics, the philosophy of language, the philosophy of dialogue, and the philosophy of the person.

In 2009, he took the habilitation exam in dogmatic theology through the Faculty of Theology at the University of Trier. His thesis dealt with the relationship between the person and transubstantiation under the supervision of Rudolf Voderholzer. He was appointed a professor of dogma and history of dogma. As a dogmatist, he focused mainly on Systematic theology, particularly in the area of Christology, ecclesiology and Mariology.

In July 2013, the College of Philosophy and Theology in Benediktbeuern closed. Oster continued to lecture at the Katholische Stiftungsfachhochschule München. He also taught at LMU Munich.

== Bishop of Passau ==
His Coat of Arms as bishop

On 4 April 2014, Pope Francis appointed Oster as the 85th Bishop of Passau. He received his episcopal consecration on 24 May at the Cathedral of St Stephen in Passau from the Archbishop of Munich and Freising Cardinal Reinhard Marx. The co-consecrators were Wilhelm Schraml, emeritus bishop of Passau, and the emeritus archbishop of Salzburg, Alois Kothgasser. At the time, Oster was the youngest German bishop. Stefan Oster chose the motto Victoria Veritatis Caritas ("The victory of truth is love").

In an interview a month later, he argued for maintaining the requirement for priestly celibacy, while allowing that it is not dogma and could be changed. He expressed support for Christian unity, but disappointment that Protestants use the Catholic Church to underscore differences more than unities. In June 2018, he joined several other German bishops in asking the Congregation for the Doctrine of the Faith (CDF) to comment on proposals of the German Bishops' Conference to recommend that Catholics remarried outside the Church be admitted to the Eucharist. He was pleased that the Congregation found the proposals premature and said this demonstrated that the issue could not be resolved by a national conference. He said allowing access to the Eucharist was a difficult issue acceptable in certain cases, but these exceptions should not become the rule. He provided guidelines for his priests to use in counseling situations and advised discretion if admission to the Eucharist was granted. He said: "What we certainly do not need are ostentatious displays of exceptions to the rule."

In March and April 2019, Oster gave several interviews on current topics relating to the Church and sexual issues. He said that celibacy is "a treasure" and he did not want to discourage priests who struggle to maintain their vows of celibacy, but he thought it would be hard to sustain "if the vast majority of priests said that it is no longer livable in this time and society". He said celibacy was not dogma and pointed to the Eastern rite churches as possible models.

He affirmed his belief in the possibility a chaste life, but he was also certain that the frequency with which priests failed to maintain celibacy risked transforming celibacy from a testament of Christian faith into its opposite. He said that Christian sexual morality needs further developments in order to demonstrate that sacerdotal marriage has ceased to qualify as a sin and can be blessed in the Catholic Church.

In September 2019, Oster gave "a poignant address" at the end of a meeting of the German Bishops' Conference that determined, despite many concerns, to proceed with a national synod. He asked "How does a person regard their faith today in this church and this society?" He said a critical-minded youth probably saw scandal, an "archaic" or "crooked organization with forbidding morals and incomprehensible regulations of belief." He lamented the Church's failure to communicate its joy because it seems crippled by "the crimes, the complacency, the absence of responsibility and holy experiences." He described many faithful as tolerating the Church, adopting a "'Catholicism of resignation' along the lines of, 'I still belong to the church despite everything, anyway the church still does a lot in terms of social work.'" He advised: "Our time demands witnesses of holiness, especially also of simple holiness in everyday life, of which Pope Francis speaks."

In March 2021, Oster was one of three German bishops to welcome the CDF's explanation of why the Church prohibited the blessing of same-sex relations.

In 2025, he delivered the laudatio for Robert Barron, an American bishop who had been criticised for his perceived support of Donald Trump and for anti-LGBTQ and anti-migrant views. He accused Trump of showing contempt for truth, disadvantaged people, women and his political opponents, saying that at Charlie Kirk's memorial, Trump "displayed his hatred ... even as Charlie Kirk's widow prayed for forgiveness" of her husband's murderer, concluding that Trump "only cares about faith when he can use it for his own benefit".
