= Wilhelm Schraml =

German Roman Catholic bishop (1935–2021)

- Bishop of Passau
- Church: Catholic Church
- Diocese: Diocese of Passau
- In office: 13 December 2001 – 1 October 2012
- Predecessor: Franz Xaver Eder
- Successor: Stefan Oster
- Previous posts: Titular Bishop of Munatiana (1986-2001); Auxiliary Bishop of Regensburg (1986-2001)

Orders
- Ordination: 29 June 1961
- Consecration: 8 March 1986 by Manfred Müller

Personal details
- Born: 26 June 1935 Erbendorf, Gau Bayerische Ostmark, German Reich
- Died: 8 November 2021 (aged 86) Altötting, Bavaria, Germany
- Coat of arms

Wilhelm Schraml (26 June 1935 – 8 November 2021) was a German Roman Catholic prelate, who served as a bishop of the Roman Catholic Diocese of Passau from 2001-2012.

Schraml was born in Erbendorf. He was ordained a priest on 29 June 1961 for the Diocese of Regensburg. In 1971 he became chairman of Kolpingwerk. In 1983 he became a member of the chapter of the diocese of Regensburg.

In 1986 he was appointed an Auxiliary Bishop of Regensburg. On 8 March 1986, he was created titular bishop of Munatiana. On 13 December 2001, he was appointed bishop of Passau and installed on 23 February 2002.

Following canon law, Schraml offered his resignation to the Pope in 2010, upon reaching the age of 75. He retired on 1 October 2012.

== See also ==
Schneekirche
