= Platte (Steinwald) =

Mountain in Germany

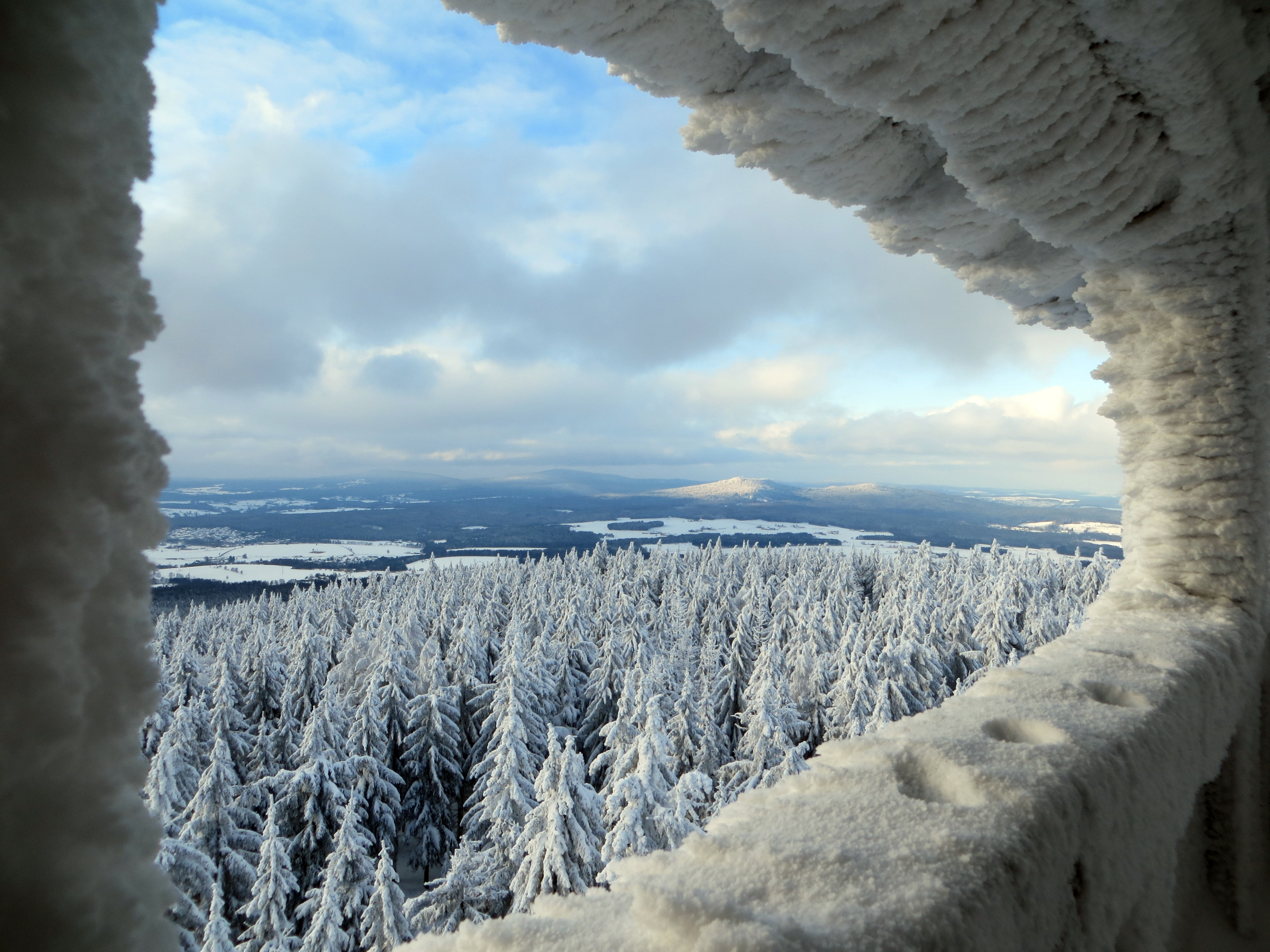
- View from the Upper Palatinate Tower on the Platte

Highest point
- Elevation: 946 m (3,104 ft)
- Listing: highest mountain in the Steinwald
- Coordinates: 49°54′36″N 12°03′11″E

Geography
- Location within Bavaria
- Location: Bavaria, Germany
- Parent range: Steinwald, Fichtel Mountains

At 946 metres (3,104 ft), the Platte is the highest mountain in the Steinwald, a forest in the Fichtel mountain range in central Germany.

The Platte is a popular walking destination, not least because of the Upper Palatinate Tower, which is located on its summit. It is climbable and offers good views of the surrounding region.

== The Upper Palatinate Tower ==
The first Upper Palatinate Tower (Oberpfalz Tower) lasted from 1972 to 1998. The second tower was officially opened on 10 September 2000. It is of wood and steel construction and was designed by Ferdinand Lehner. It has a total height of 35 metres. The observation deck is 30 metres high and can be reached via a stairway with 150 steps.

== Walking ==
Several footpaths lead to the Platte. The best-known is that from the Marktredwitzer Haus to the Weißenstein Ruins and then on to the Platte. Another of the many paths leads from the Waldhaus to the Platte.
