= Erkan Martin =

German footballer

Personal information
- Full name: Erkan Martin
- Date of birth: April 13, 1984 (age 42)
- Place of birth: Marktredwitz, Germany
- Height: 1.97 m (6 ft 6 in)
- Position: Forward

Senior career*
| Years | Team | Apps | (Gls) |
| 2004–2006 | 1 FC Burk | 0 | (0) |
| 2006–2007 | Altay | 7 | (0) |
| 2007–2008 | İzmirspor | 8 | (1) |
| 2008 | Akçaabat Sebatspor | 5 | (1) |
| 2008–2009 | Bulancakspor | 0 | (0) |
| 2009–2010 | Giresunspor | 0 | (0) |
| 2010 | Baiersdorf SV | 0 | (0) |
| 2010–2013 | BSC Erlangen | 23 | (8) |
| 2003–2017 | SC Oberreichenbach | 13 | (3) |
- * Club domestic league appearances and goals as of 4 June 2018 ‡ National team caps and goals as of 4 June 2018

Erkan Martin (born 13 April 1984) is a German former professional footballer who played as a forward. He had a short stint with Altay in the Süper Lig, but spent most of his career as an amateur in Turkey and Germany.

Martin made his professional debut with Altay in a 1–0 Süper Lig loss to Orduspor on 29 October 2006.

== Personal life ==
Martin is the younger brother of the Turkish international footballer Ersen Martin. After his footballing career, Martin got his license to become a professional football scout and manager.
