= Franz Xaver Eder =

Roman Catholic Bishop

- Bishop of Passau
- Church: Catholic Church
- Diocese: Diocese of Passau
- In office: 15 October 1984 – 8 January 2001
- Predecessor: Antonius Hofmann
- Successor: Wilhelm Schraml
- Previous posts: Coadjutor Bishop of Passau (1984); Titular Bishop of Villa Regis (1977-1984); Auxiliary Bishop of Passau (1977-1984)

Orders
- Ordination: 29 June 1954
- Consecration: 16 July 1977 by Antonius Hofmann

Personal details
- Born: 4 November 1925 Pfarrkirchen, Free State of Bavaria, German Reich
- Died: 20 June 2013 (aged 87)

Franz Xaver Eder (4 November 1925 – 20 June 2013) was a Roman Catholic bishop.

Ordained in 1954 for the Roman Catholic Diocese of Passau, Germany, Eder was named auxiliary bishop of the Passau Diocese in 1977. In 1984, Eder was named coadjutor bishop of the Passau and succeeded as bishop in 1984. In 2001, Eder retired.
