= Upper Palatinate Tower =

Observation tower on Platte mountain, Germany

Coordinates: 49°54′36″N 12°3′11″E

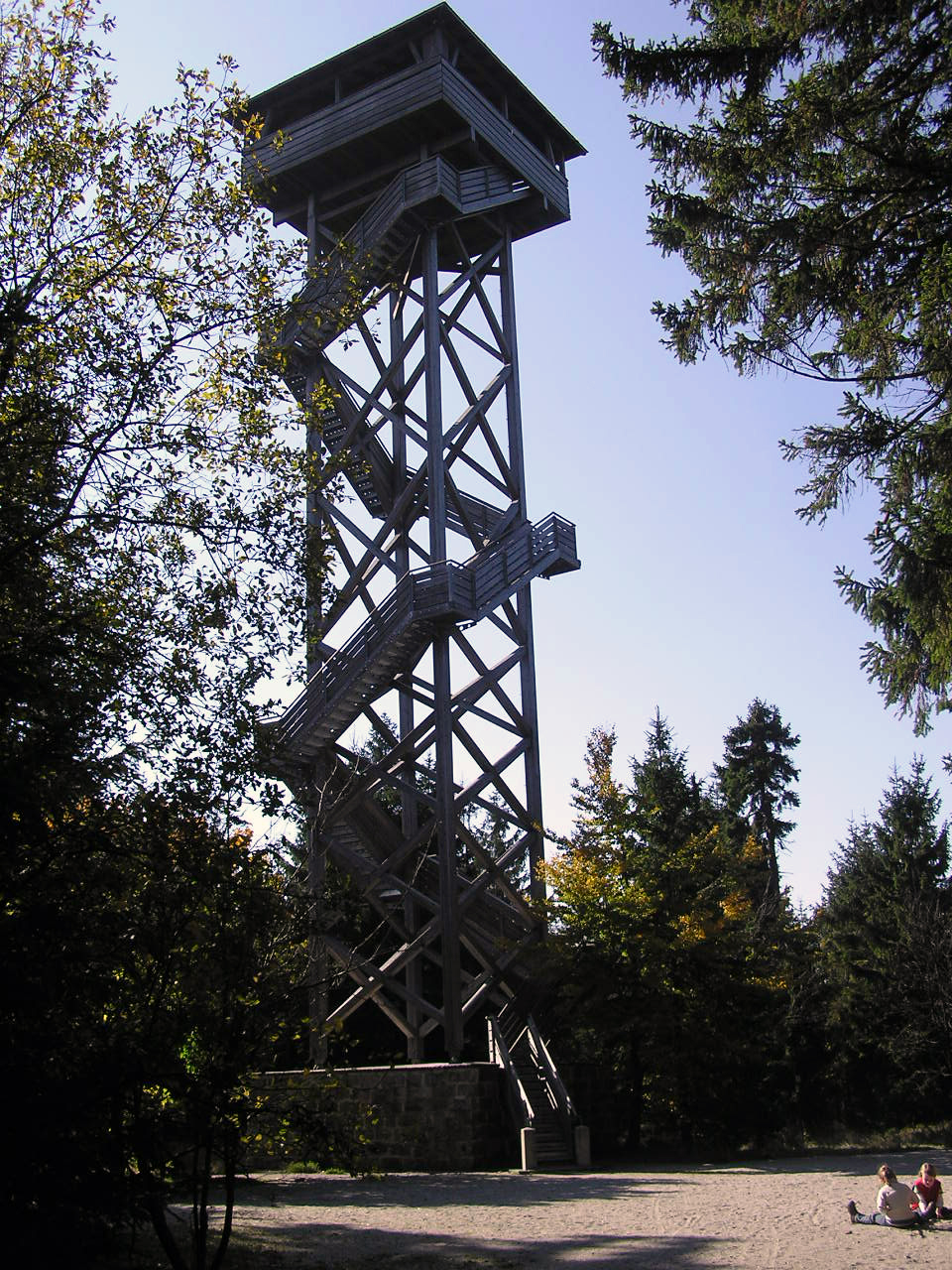
The Upper Palatinate Tower (Oberpfalzturm)

The Upper Palatinate Tower (German: Oberpfalzturm) is an observation tower on the 946 metres (3,104 ft) high Platte mountain, the highest peak in the Steinwald and in Northern Upper Palatinate in southern Germany.

The first solid observation tower was built in 1971–1972 by the Steinwald Nature Park Authority from Steinwald spruce trees. Due to dilapidation it had to be demolished on 1 April 1998. The engineer, Ferdinand Lehner, from Tirschenreuth was then given the contract to design and build a new tower.

On 10 September 2000 the new observation tower was opened. It is 35 metres (115 ft) high and was made of larch plywood. The contract was let by the town of Erbendorf. The total cost of construction came to about DM 400,000 and was supported by grants from the European Union, the Free State of Bavaria, the district of Tirschenreuth and the surrounding towns and villages. From the observation platform there are views of the Fichtel Mountains, the Karlovy Vary Region, the Stiftland and over the Upper Palatine Forest.
