= Cube Bikes =

German bicycle brand

CUBE
- Type: GmbH & Co. KG
- Industry: Bicycle Manufacturing
- Founded: 1993
- Headquarters: Waldershof, Germany
- Key people: Marcus Pürner (Founder)
- Products: Bicycles and related components
- Revenue: €1.162 billion (2021/2022)
- Number of employees: 450 (2016)
- Website: cube.eu

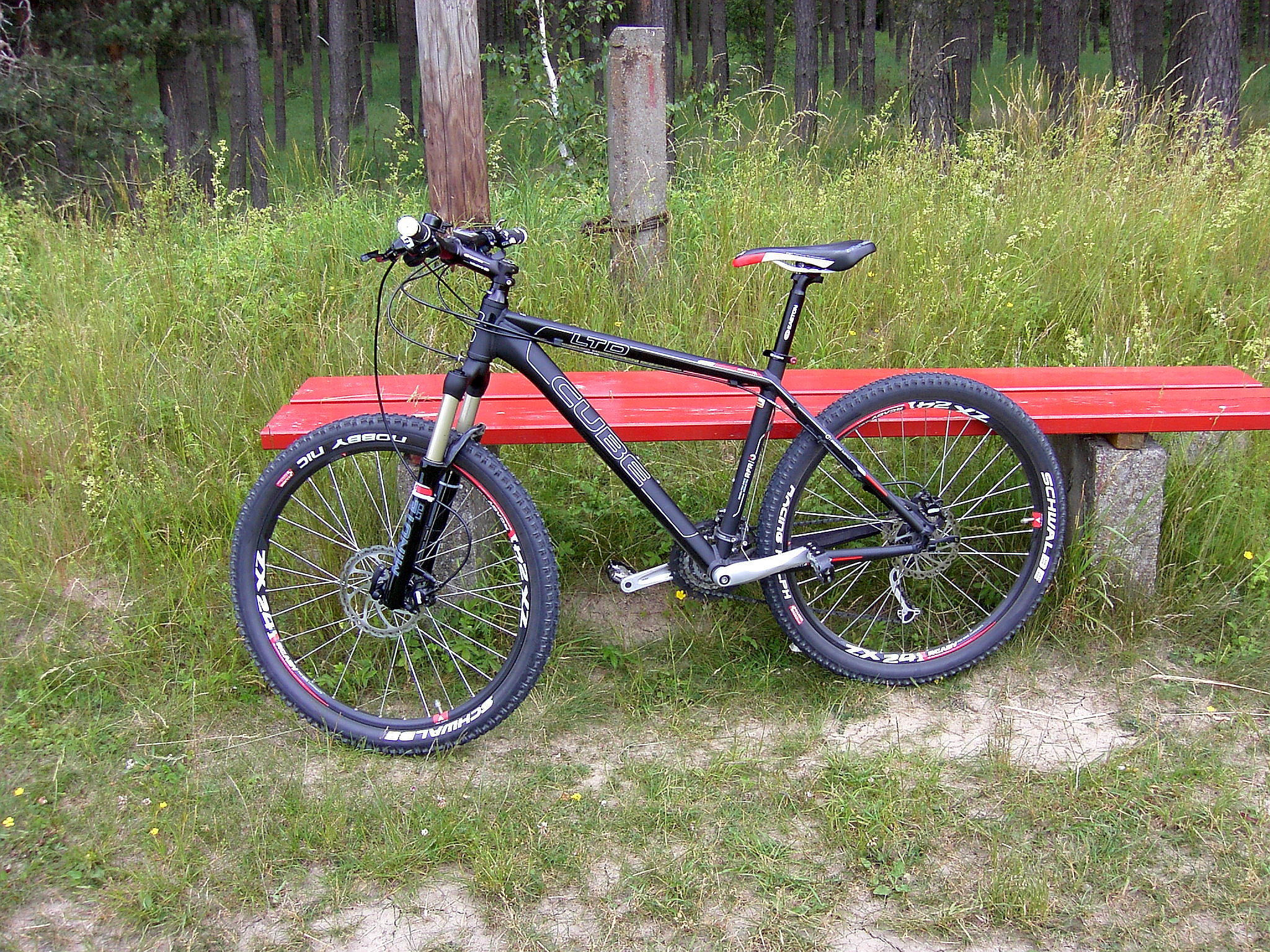
CUBE LTD PRO 2010 Black

CUBE is a German bicycle brand.

== History ==
The company was founded in 1993 by Marcus Pürner, who began with an area of 50 m^{2} in his father's furniture factory in Waldershof, Germany. The company has expanded its production area to 55,000 m^{2} and sells to more than 60 countries all over the world. They currently sponsor TotalEnergies.

== Products ==
The current product range consists of various types of mountain bikes, road bikes, cross bikes, triathlon bikes, e-bikes as well as trekking bikes. Ergonomically fitted women's bikes, bikes for kids, wear and accessories complete the product line-up.

== Pilots & Teams ==
- CUBE Action Team: Nicolas Lau, Gusti Wildhaber, André Wagenknecht and Daniel Schemmel & Newest Member Andrew Thomsen.
- CUBE Global Squad: Greg Williamson, Jessie and bramble (UNNO factory racing) and Matt Walker.
- Triathlon: Lucy Charles-Barclay, Raelert Brothers (Andreas und Michael Raelert), Daniela Sämmler, Svenja Bazlen, Céline Schärer, Malte Bruns
- Factory Pilots: Nicole Leder and Lothar Leder, Louis Wolf, Lisa Breckner, Gerd Schönfelder, Team Erdinger Alkoholfrei, Team Strassacker, MHW CUBE Racing Team
- Factory Co-Pilots
