= Erbendorf =

- Town
- Coat of arms

- Location of Erbendorf within Tirschenreuth district
- Interactive map of Erbendorf
- Location within Germany Location within Bavaria
- Coordinates: 49°50′N 12°3′E
- Country: Germany
- State: Bavaria
- Admin. region: Oberpfalz
- District: Tirschenreuth
- Subdivisions: 23 Ortsteile

Government
  - Mayor (2020–26): Johannes Reger (CSU)

Area
  - Total: 67.56 km^{2} (26.09 sq mi)
- Elevation: 506 m (1,660 ft)

Population (2025-12-31)
  - Total: 5,026
  - Density: 74.39/km^{2} (192.7/sq mi)
- Time zone: UTC+01:00 (CET)
  - Summer (DST): UTC+02:00 (CEST)
- Postal codes: 92681
- Dialling codes: 09682
- Vehicle registration: TIR
- Website: www.erbendorf.de

Erbendorf (German pronunciation: [ˈɛʁbn̩ˌdɔʁf]; Bavarian: Arndorf) is a town in the Upper Palatinate (Oberpfalz) region of Germany. As of December, 2006, the town has a population of 5,341.

The following villages are incorporated into the town: Aschenhof, Birkenreuth, Boxdorf, Eppenhof, Frodersreuth, Glashütte, Gössenreuth, Gramlhof, Grötschenreuth, Hauxdorf, Inglashof, Napfberg, Neuenreuth, Pfaben, Plärn, Schadenreuth, Siegritz, Steinbach, Straßenschacht, Thann, Wäldern, Wetzldorf, and Wildenreuth.

== Main Attractions of Erbendorf ==
- Hiking and biking in the Stienwald region; a mountain range and a national park well known for its long-distance trails.
- The Mining Museum of Erbendorf, as the city has a very rich mining history.
- A public recreation center equipped with two heated outdoor pools.
- Walking tour of cellars.

== Personalities ==
=== Sons and daughters of the city ===
- Hans Müller (1898-1974), politician (SPD), Member of Bundestag 1953-1965
- Wilhelm Schraml (born 1935), 84. Bishop of Passau

=== Personalities who have worked in the city ===
- Norbert Scharf (1952-2010), Landtag deputy (SPD), was from 2005 to 2008 member of the town council of Erbendorf
