= Marktredwitz =

- Town
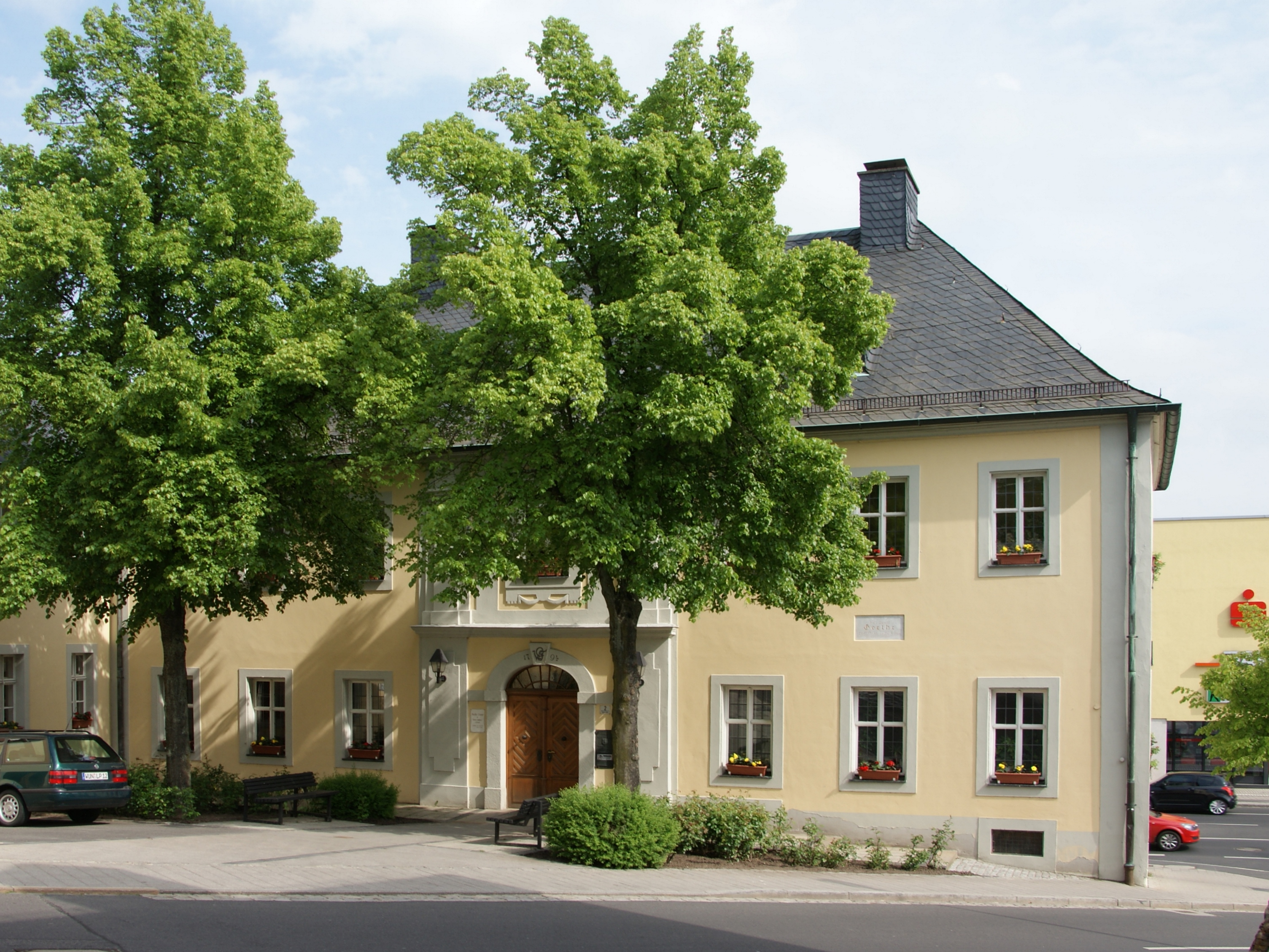
- New town hall

- Coat of arms

- Location of Marktredwitz within Wunsiedel im Fichtelgebirge district
- Interactive map of Marktredwitz
- Location within Germany Location within Bavaria
- Coordinates: 50°0′N 12°4′E
- Country: Germany
- State: Bavaria
- Admin. region: Oberfranken
- District: Wunsiedel im Fichtelgebirge
- Subdivisions: 23 Ortsteile

Government
  - Mayor (2020–26): Oliver Weigel (CSU)

Area
  - Total: 49.52 km^{2} (19.12 sq mi)
- Elevation: 482–660 m (1,581–2,165 ft)

Population (2025-12-31)
  - Total: 17,166
  - Density: 346.6/km^{2} (897.8/sq mi)
- Time zone: UTC+01:00 (CET)
  - Summer (DST): UTC+02:00 (CEST)
- Postal codes: 95615
- Dialling codes: 09231
- Vehicle registration: WUN, MAK, REH, SEL
- Website: www.marktredwitz.de

Marktredwitz (German: [maʁktˈʁɛtvɪts]; Bavarian: Rawetz; Czech: Trhová Ředvice) is a town in the district of Wunsiedel, in Bavaria, Germany, close to the Czech border, 22 km west of Cheb, 50 km east of Bayreuth and 50 km south of Hof/Saale. Marktredwitz station is at the junction of the Nuremberg–Cheb railway and the Munich–Hof railway. It celebrated the Horticultural Show 2006 in cooperation with Cheb.

== Notable people ==
- Holger Grießhammer, politician
- Ronny Krippner, organist
- Birgit Lodes, musicologist
- Oscar Loew, agricultural chemist
- Ersen Martin, footballer
- Erkan Martin, footballer
- Reinhard Pöllath, lawyer
- Karl Ritter, Nazi politician
- Reinhard Scheer, admiral

== Clubs ==
- Volleyballgemeinschaft Fichtelgebirge Marktredwitz

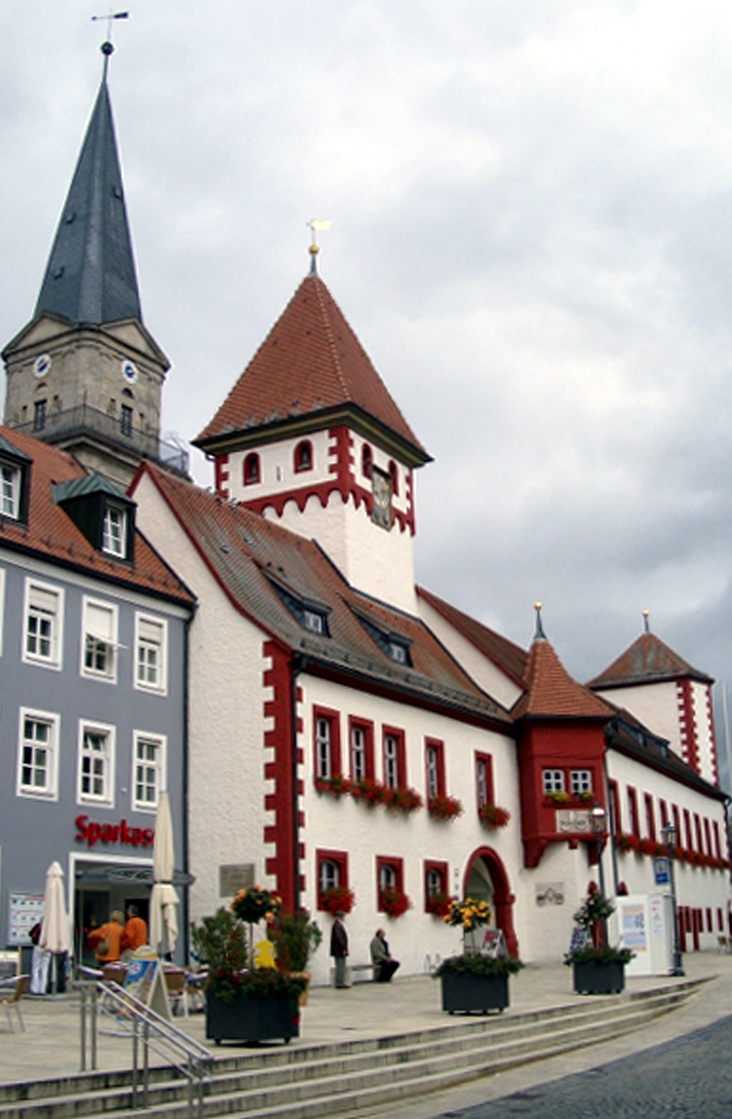
Old town hall and church
