= Mohammed Mostajo-Radji =

(born 1989)

Mohammed A. Mostajo-Radji
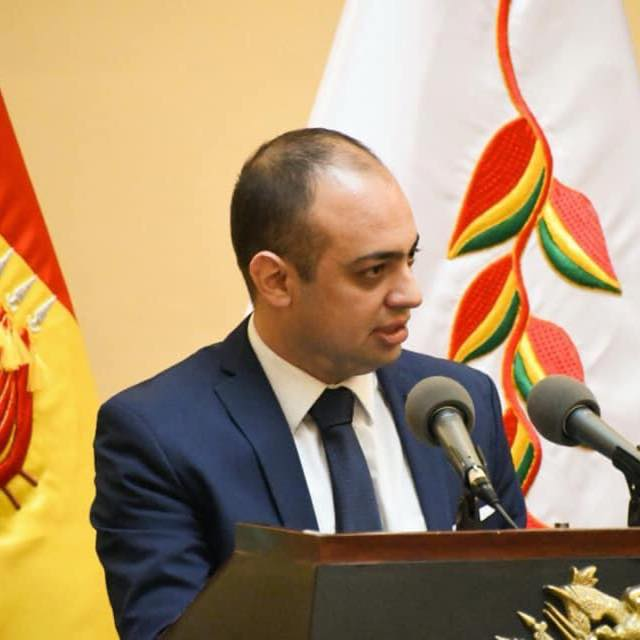
- Mostajo-Radji addresses Bolivia during his inauguration in 2020
- Born: 9 January 1989 (age 37); Santa Cruz de la Sierra, Bolivia
- Education: Rochester Institute of Technology (B.Sc.); Harvard University (A.M.); Harvard University (Ph.D.)
- Awards: Google Cloud Research Innovator (2023); Latin Maya Award (2019); 25 Drivers of a New Economy (2018); Honorary Doctorate - Jose Ballivian University (2017); Latino 30 under 30 (2017); Franz Tamayo Medal (2015); Person of the Year - El Deber Newspaper (2015); John Wiley Jones Award for Outstanding Students in Science (2011)
- Scientific career
- Fields: Neuroscience, science diplomacy
- Workplaces: Harvard University, University of California San Francisco, United Nations, University of California Santa Cruz
- Thesis: In Vivo Reprogramming of Neuronal Identity and Local Connectivity in the Neocortex (2016)
- Academic advisors: Paola Arlotta (Ph.D.); Alex Pollen (Postdoctoral Studies)
- Website: Mostajo-Radji.com

Mohammed A. Mostajo-Radji (born January 9, 1989) is a Bolivian scientist and diplomat. As the former Bolivian Ambassador for Science, Technology and Innovation, he has been the only Latin American science diplomat at the rank of ambassador.

== Scientific career ==
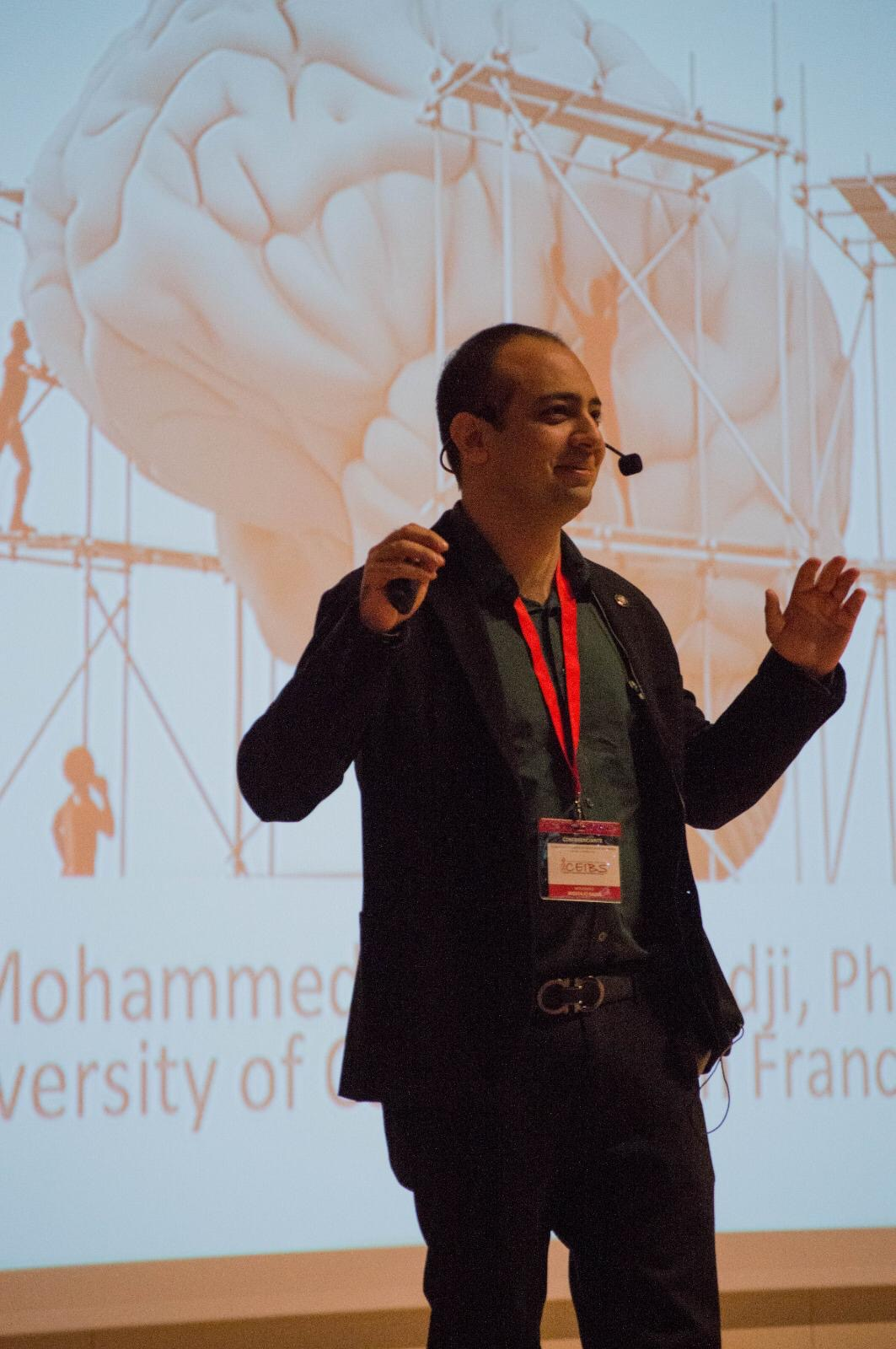
Mostajo-Radji keynotes a medical conference in Granada, Spain

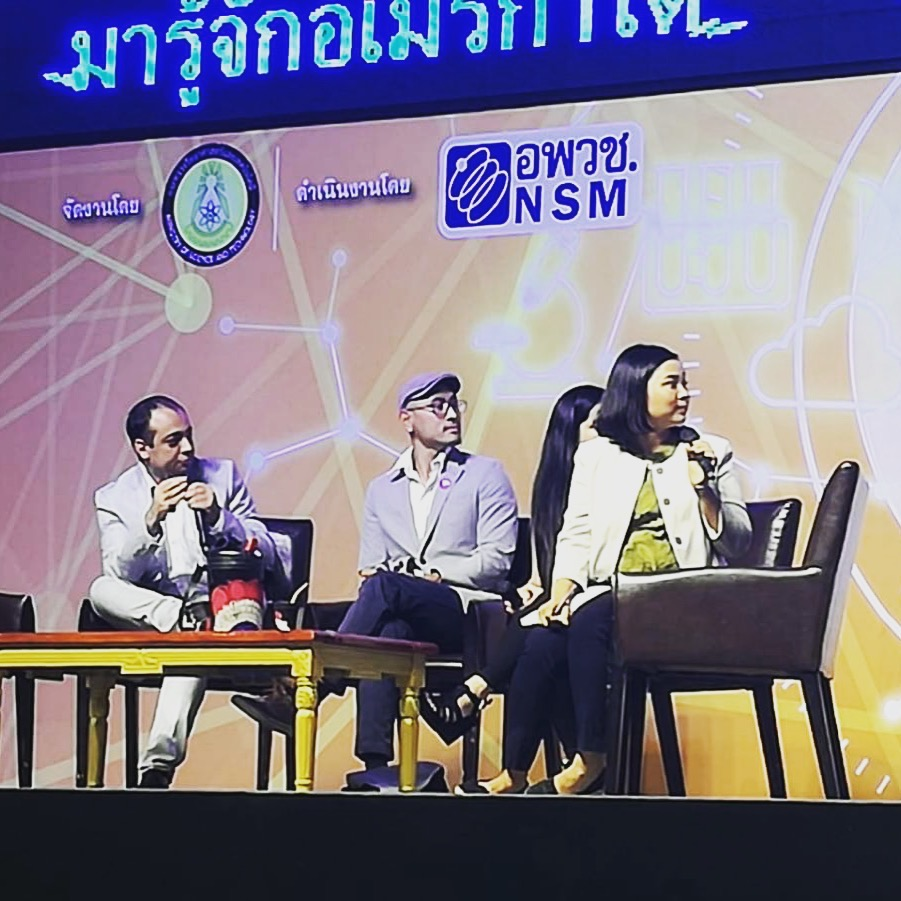
Mostajo-Radji participates in a panel at the Thailand National Science and Technology Fair in Bangkok

Mostajo-Radji completed his undergraduate studies at the Rochester Institute of Technology, where he majored in Biotechnology and Bioinformatics and obtained a minor in Science, Technology and Society Studies. During his undergraduate times, he researched the genetic components of age-related hearing-loss under the supervision of Dina Newman. In addition he worked closely with Robert Dirksen at the University of Rochester studying autosomal dominant skeletal myopathies and with Nobel prize laureate Roger Tsien at the University of California San Diego synthesizing dual-modality bioimaging probes.

He completed his PhD at Harvard University in Molecular and Cellular Biology under the supervision of Paola Arlotta. His doctoral thesis focused on neuronal and cortical circuit reprogramming. His postdoctoral work, under the supervision of Alex Pollen at the University of California San Francisco focused on organoid models of brain development and evolution. Throughout his scientific career, Mostajo-Radji has collaborated closely with many renowned neuroscientists, chemists, engineers and computational biologists, including, David Haussler, Adam Cohen, Arnold Kriegstein, Takao Hensch and Arturo Alvarez-Buylla.

In April 2021, Mostajo-Radji announced in his social medias that he had accepted a position as an Assistant Research Scientist at the Genomics Institute of the University of California Santa Cruz, where he holds principal investigator status. Shortly after, he announced that he had been elected as a member of the Global Young Academy effective 2021. Currently, Mostajo-Radji leads a research laboratory that is part of the Braingeneers consortium and is also the Director of the Live Cell Biotechnology Discovery Lab.

== Diplomatic career ==
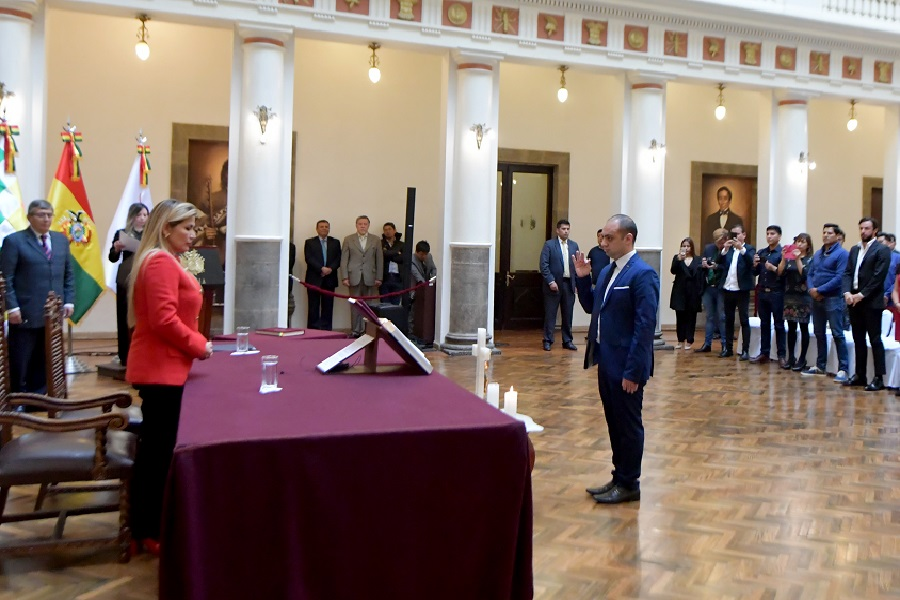
Mostajo-Radji swore in by President Jeanine Áñez as Latin America's first Science, Technology and Innovation Ambassador at the Bolivian Presidential Palace in La Paz

Through a collaboration with the U.S. Department of State, Mostajo-Radji founded the Bolivian chapter of Clubes de Ciencia in 2015. This project aimed to create bridges of science education between the United States and Bolivia. Originally criticized by the Bolivian government, this program rapidly became the most prestigious science education program in Bolivia. Moreover, it became the largest science diplomacy experiment in Bolivian history.

In February 2020, President Jeanine Áñez appointed him as Extraordinary Ambassador for Science, Technology and Innovation to international organizations and Silicon Valley. His primary affiliation was the United Nations, where he was part of the Bolivian Permanent Mission. His role in Bolivian diplomacy became particularly relevant during the COVID-19 pandemic, as he led the scientific response team to the pandemic. From this position, Mostajo-Radji assisted the Bolivian Chancellery with securing several donations of medical equipment, diagnostic software, laboratory tests and personal protective equipment from foreign governments and tech companies, including Alibaba and Huawei. In addition, he aided Bolivian companies facilitating the international transit and import of raw materials for local production of medications against COVID-19. Upon dissolution of the strategic response room in La Paz on April 28, 2020, Mostajo-Radji worked with the United Nations Development Programme to install 13 molecular diagnosis labs across Bolivia. Throughout the month of May, he personally run patient samples in several of these labs. Mostajo-Radji chose to work without pay while in Bolivia, and requested to donate his salary to his country's fight against COVID-19 instead. In December 2020, Nature magazine included Mostajo-Radji among the seven science advisors highlighted in its end of the year special on COVID-19. In his invited contribution, he brought attention to some of the major issues he had to overcome, including political attacks and internal fights with members of the cabinet and the armed forces. After his work in Bolivia, Mostajo-Radji returned to the United States, where he worked in elucidating the molecular mechanisms of COVID-19 infection in the brain. He is a coauthor in an article published in the Proceedings of the United States National Academy of Sciences that shows the tropism of SARS-CoV-2 for human cortical astrocytes.

Mostajo-Radji wrote two articles highlighting the special needs of his country during the pandemic: one article brings attention to the need for testing ventilators at high altitude, and another one warning about the risks of HIV transmission in hyperimmune convalescent plasma donations in low- and middle- income countries. Both articles were highlighted in the COVID-19 section of the International Network for Government Science Advice (INGSA) website. More recently, he has been the proponent of neurodiplomacy as a new science diplomacy tool that focuses on issues related to brain manipulation, governance and health.

== Honors and awards ==
Mostajo-Radji has received several awards, including an honorary doctorate from Jose Ballivian University in Beni, Bolivia. In addition, he has been granted the Franz Tamayo medal, which is the highest honor granted by the Bolivian Senate. In 2015, he was selected as Person of the Year by El Deber newspaper, and in 2017 he was selected as "Latino 30 under 30" by El Mundo Boston. In 2019 he received the Latin Maya Award from the Networking for the Arts Foundation in Washington DC for his work in education development in Latin America. Other awards include the "Cruz Potenzada", which is the maximum award granted by the Comite Civico Pro Santa Cruz, as well as the Melchor Pinto award granted by the Government of Santa Cruz, Bolivia. In 2023, Mostajo-Radji was selected as a Google Cloud Research Innovator.

== Select publications ==
Science Publications

- Ye, Zhanlei; Mostajo-Radji, Mohammed A.; Brown, Juliana R.; Rouaux, Caroline; Tomassy, Giulio Srubek; Hensch, Takao K.; Arlotta, Paola (2015). "Instructing Perisomatic Inhibition by Direct Lineage Reprogramming of Neocortical Projection Neurons". Neuron. 88 (3): 475–483. doi:10.1016/j.neuron.2015.10.006. PMC 4794746. PMID 26539889.
- Baudin, Pierre V.; Sacksteder, Raina E.; Worthington, Atesh K.; Voitiuk, Kateryna; Ly, Victoria T.; Hoffman, Ryan N.; Elliott, Matthew A.T.; Parks, David F.; Ward, Rebecca; Torres-Montoya, Sebastian; Amend, Finn; Montellano Duran, Natalia; Vargas, Paola A.; Martinez, Guadalupe; Ramirez, Sandra M.; Alvarado-Arnez, Lucia Elena; Ehrlich, Drew; Rosen, Yohei M.; Breevoort, Arnar; Schouten, Tallulah; Kurniawan, Sri; Haussler, David; Teodorescu, Mircea; Mostajo-Radji, Mohammed A. (2022). "Cloud-controlled microscopy enables remote project-based biology education in underserved Latinx communities". Heliyon. 8 (11) e11596. Bibcode:2022Heliy...811596B. doi:10.1016/j.heliyon.2022.e11596. PMC 9681640. PMID 36439758.
- Gonzalez-Ferrer, Jesus; Lehrer, Julian; o'Farrell, Ash; Paten, Benedict; Teodorescu, Mircea; Haussler, David; Jonsson, Vanessa D.; Mostajo-Radji, Mohammed A. (2024). "SIMS: A deep-learning label transfer tool for single-cell RNA sequencing analysis". Cell Genomics. 4 (6). bioRxiv 10.1101/2023.02.28.529615. doi:10.1016/j.xgen.2024.100581. PMC 11228957. PMID 38823397.
- Sano, Tyler; Sampad, Mohammad Julker Neyen; Gonzalez-Ferrer, Jesus; Hernandez, Sebastian; Vera-Choqqueccota, Samira; Vargas, Paola A.; Urcuyo, Roberto; Montellano Duran, Natalia; Teodorescu, Mircea; Haussler, David; Schmidt, Holger; Mostajo-Radji, Mohammed A. (2024). "Internet-enabled lab-on-a-chip technology for education". Scientific Reports. 14 (1): 14364. Bibcode:2024NatSR..1414364S. bioRxiv 10.1101/2023.04.28.538776. doi:10.1038/s41598-024-65346-0. PMC 11192768. PMID 38906940.

Science Diplomacy Publications

- Mostajo-Radji, Mohammed A. (2023). "A Latin American perspective on neurodiplomacy". Frontiers in Medical Technology. 4. doi:10.3389/fmedt.2022.1005043. PMC 9880232. PMID 36712171.
- Mostajo-Radji, Mohammed A. (2022). "The emergence of neurodiplomacy". iScience. 25 (6). Bibcode:2022iSci...25j4370M. doi:10.1016/j.isci.2022.104370. PMC 9120262. PMID 35601914.
- Awandare, Gordon; André, Emmanuel; Corrales-Aguilar, Eugenia; Chen, Chien-jen; Mostajo-Radji, Mohammed A.; Jancoriene, Ligita; Nemer, Mona (2020). "Science advisers around the world on 2020". Nature. 588 (7839): 586–588. Bibcode:2020Natur.588..586A. doi:10.1038/d41586-020-03557-x. PMID 33340028.
- Breevoort, Arnar; Carosso, Giovanni A.; Mostajo-Radji, Mohammed A. (2020). "High-altitude populations need special considerations for COVID-19". Nature Communications. 11 (1): 3280. Bibcode:2020NatCo..11.3280B. doi:10.1038/s41467-020-17131-6. PMC 7329858. PMID 32612128.
- Ferreira, Leonardo M. R.; Mostajo-Radji, Mohammed A. (2020). "Plasma-based COVID-19 treatments in low- and middle-income nations pose a high risk of an HIV epidemic". npj Vaccines. 5: 58. doi:10.1038/s41541-020-0209-2. PMC 7338534. PMID 32655899.
- Barber, Kevin; Mostajo-Radji, Mohammed A. (2020). "Youth Networks' Advances Toward the Sustainable Development Goals During the COVID-19 Pandemic". Frontiers in Sociology. 5. doi:10.3389/fsoc.2020.589539. PMC 8022559. PMID 33869518.
- Acosta, M; Szlamka, Z; Mostajo-Radji, MA (2020). "Transnational youth networks: an evolving form of public diplomacy to accelerate the Sustainable Development Goals". SocArXiv. doi:10.31235/osf.io/8247s. S2CID 219069565.
- Carosso, Giovanni A.; Ferreira, Leonardo M. R.; Mostajo-Radji, Mohammed A. (2019). "Developing Brains, Developing Nations: Can Scientists be Effective Non-state Diplomats?". Frontiers in Education. 4. doi:10.3389/feduc.2019.00095.
- Carosso, Giovanni A.; Ferreira, Leonardo M. R.; Mostajo-Radji, Mohammed A. (2019). "Scientists as non-state actors of public diplomacy". Nature Human Behaviour. 3 (11): 1129–1130. doi:10.1038/s41562-019-0716-1. PMID 31427786.
- Ferreira, Leonardo M. R.; Carosso, Giovanni A.; Montellano Duran, Natalia; Bohorquez-Massud, Soad V.; Vaca-Diez, Gustavo; Rivera-Betancourt, Laura Ines; Rodriguez, Yara; Ordonez, Dalila G.; Alatriste-Gonzalez, Diana K.; Vacaflores, Aldo; Gonzalez Auza, Lilian; Schuetz, Christian; Alvarado-Arnez, Lucia Elena; Alexander-Savino, Carolina V.; Gandarilla, Omar; Mostajo-Radji, Mohammed A. (2019). "Effective participatory science education in a diverse Latin American population". Palgrave Communications. 5. doi:10.1057/s41599-019-0275-0.
