= Clubes de Ciencia =

Non-profit organization

Science Clubs
- Clubes de Ciencia
- Abbreviation: CdeC
- Founded at: Boston, Massachusetts
- Type: Non-profit organization
- Volunteers: 50+
- Website: www.scienceclubsint.org

Clubes de Ciencia is a non-profit organization founded in 2014 that organizes hands-on week-long workshops in STEM to kids in developing countries at no cost. The instructors are PhD volunteers from top universities, such as Harvard, Princeton, MIT who organizes the workshops. By combining hands-on experimental learning, on-line exercises and mentorship, Clubes de Ciencia takes a unique approach to educating the millennials in developing countries. In two years, Clubes de Ciencia grew past its Mexico program, to also work in Colombia and Bolivia. Currently, it also operates in Brazil, Paraguay, Peru and Spain.

== 2014 ==
The first edition of Science Clubs was organized in Guanajuato, Mexico, in January 2014, with the support of Universidad de Guanajuato.

== 2017 ==
In 2017, Science Clubs expanded to three new countries: Paraguay, Peru and Brazil

The first edition of the Brazilian Chapter (Clubes de Ciência Brasil) was held at Universidade Federal de Minas Gerais, in Belo Horizonte, in July 2017. Four clubs in the areas of epidemiology, stem cells and gene editing, immunology and entrepreneurship were organized by researchers from top Universities from the US and Brazil, including Harvard, Northeastern and UFMG for 80 students from six different states of the country.

== Prizes and awards ==
On April 15, 2015, the Latin American Science Education Network (now Science Clubs International) was among the winners of the MIT "IDEAS" Global Challenge Awards.

Also in 2015, Mohammed Mostajo-Radji, as Executive Director of Clubes de Ciencia Bolivia was awarded the "Person of the Year" award by the Bolivian newspaper El Deber and the Franz Tamayo Medal by the Senate of Bolivia.

In 2016, Hugo Arellano-Santoyo and Clubes de Ciencia were awarded with the Dean's Community Service Award from the Harvard Medical School. The prize is awarded "to recognize individuals whose dedication and commitment to community service have made a positive impact on the local, national, or international community".

In 2016, Maier Avendano, Executive Director of Clubes de Ciencia Colombia was named among the "Latino 30 under 30" by the El Mundo Boston. Mohammed Mostajo-Radji and the team of Clubes de Ciencia Bolivia received this award in 2017. Since its first version in 2015, 722 volunteer scientists living abroad or in Colombia have collaborated to create 364 clubs with the participation of 9,295 students. We describe elements of the SCC program that lead to a scalable and reproducible outcome to engage science diasporas in STEAM education in this scientific paper published in Frontiers:

Additionally in 2016, Clubes de Ciencia Bolivia was awarded the Youth Peace Prize by the Government of Santa Cruz, Bolivia.

In 2018, Clubes de Ciencia Bolivia received the Melchor Pinto Parada award from the Government of Santa Cruz. This is the maximum award granted by this institution. Also in 2018, Omar Gandarilla, as Operations Director of Clubes de Ciencia Bolivia received the "Diversity in STEM" award from MiniPCR.

In 2019, under the leadership of Dr Bryann Avendaño-Uribe, Clubes de Ciencia Colombia was named "Solution Makers" by the United Nations Foundation at the United Nations Solution Summit in the General Assembly of the United Nations in New York, USA.

In 2023, HundrED selected Clubes de Ciencia International as one of the top 100 global education innovations, highlighting its impact on STEM education in Latin America.

== Partners ==
The David Rockefeller Center for Latin American Studies, the Department of Molecular and Cellular Biology at Harvard University, the Harvard Stem Cell Institute, COMEXUS and the Fundación México en Harvard University are among the key sponsors of the project.

== Endorsements ==
Clubes de Ciencia has been endorsed by a number of academics and celebrities, including 2004 Nobel Laureate Frank Wilczek; Margot Gill, Dean of International Affairs at Harvard University and Beakman.
