= Wirtgen Group =

German manufacturing company

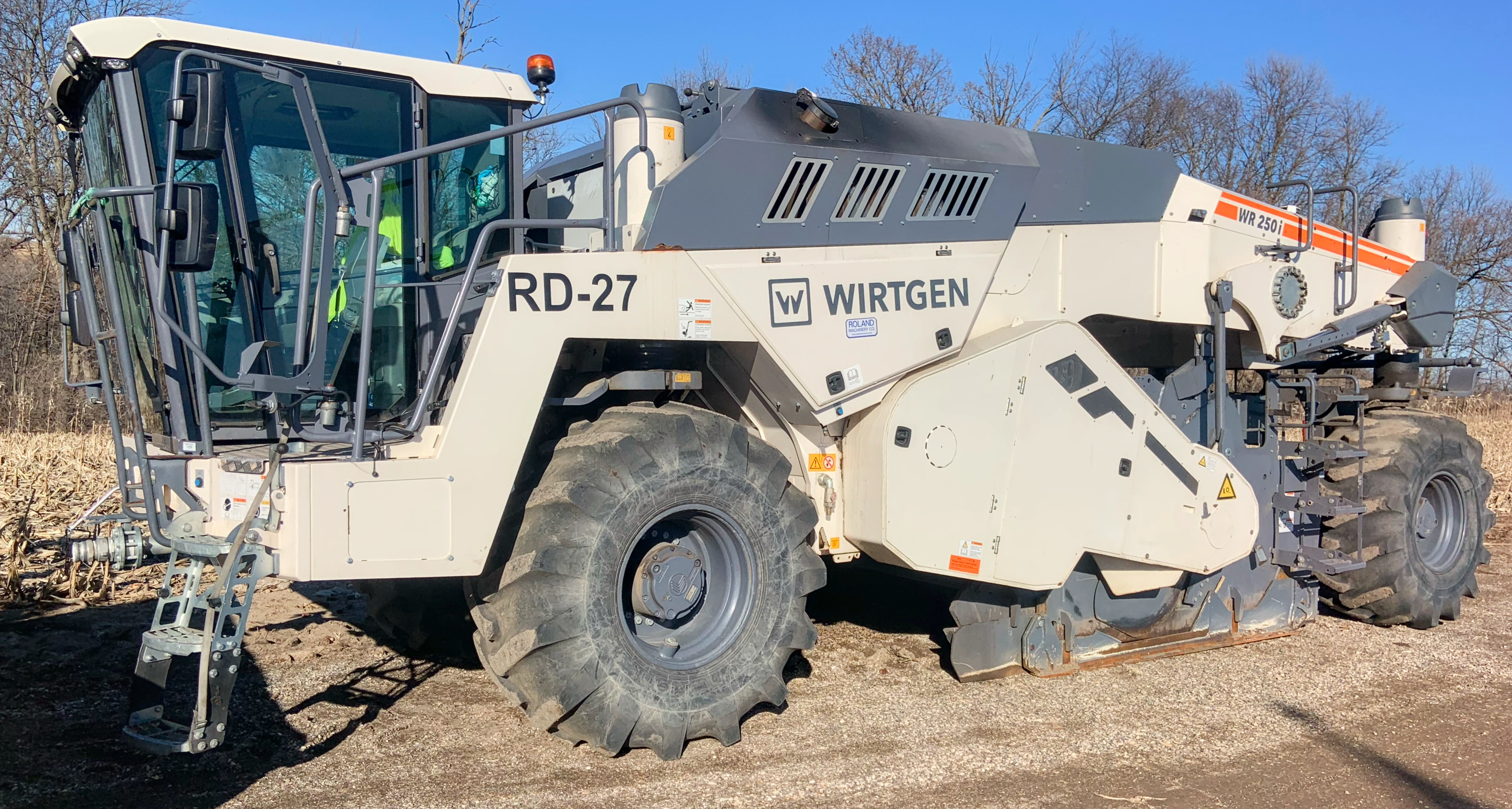
Wirtgen road recycler

Wirtgen Group is an internationally operating German company in the construction industry. The company's core business is the development and production of machinery for road construction and maintenance.

Wirtgen Group employs around 9,000 people around the world and its annual turnover is around €3 billion. It also has local manufacturing plants in Brazil, China, and India, 55 distribution and service offices and over 150 authorized dealers around the globe.

== History ==
In November 1961 Reinhard Wirtgen founded a small contracting business in Windhagen, Germany, starting with small haulage jobs and later specializing in road construction machinery with concrete breakers. Eventually Wirtgen expanded his fleet to 100 milling machines and 150 workers operating all over Germany. Reinhard Wirtgen progressed the product portfolio from hot milling to cold milling machines by the end of the 70s, which significantly increased the economic efficiency of the milling process. The international development of the company began when Reinhard Wirtgen set up the first subsidiaries outside Germany.

Reinhard Wirtgen systematically expanded his product portfolio at the production plant to four product divisions. In 1981, Wirtgen built the first surface miners for opencast mining and routing operations in hard rock. From 1987 onwards, Wirtgen introduced cold recycling as an economical method of road rehabilitation. Two years later, he incorporated the slipform paver division into his company to offer solutions for the construction of concrete roads and poured-in-place concrete profiles.

Jürgen and Stefan Wirtgen took over the management of the company in 1997. The expansion of the corporate group began with the integration of the road paver manufacturer Vögele. Hamm, a roller manufacturer, was integrated into Wirtgen Group in 1999. High investments in the three production plants resulted in the expansion of production capacities and efficiency, as well as a strong presence for the corporate group on a global scale.

In 2006 Wirtgen Group consolidated into two business lines: "Road Technologies" and "Mineral Technologies". The second line was established with the incorporation of Kleemann, a German manufacturer of mobile and stationary processing plants.

In 2014, the manufacturer of asphalt mixing plants Benninghoven was also integrated into the company.

In 2017, Wirtgen Group entered into a definitive agreement with John Deere to be purchased for $5.2 Billion.

== Product brands ==
=== Wirtgen GmbH ===
Wirtgen GmbH is located in Windhagen in Rheinland-Pfalz, and it is the youngest and largest subcompany of the corporation. Wirtgen GmbH produces road milling machines and cold recyclers, as well as Surface miners for open cast mining operations.

=== Joseph Vögele AG ===
Joseph Vögele AG is based in Ludwigshafen am Rhein in Rheinland-Pfalz. The company is the world market leader for asphalt pavers and belongs to Wirtgen Group since 1996.

=== Hamm AG ===
HAMM AG, founded in Tirschenreuth in Bayern, is specialized in compaction technology. It is part of Wirtgen Group since 2000 and it manufactures road and soil compactors.

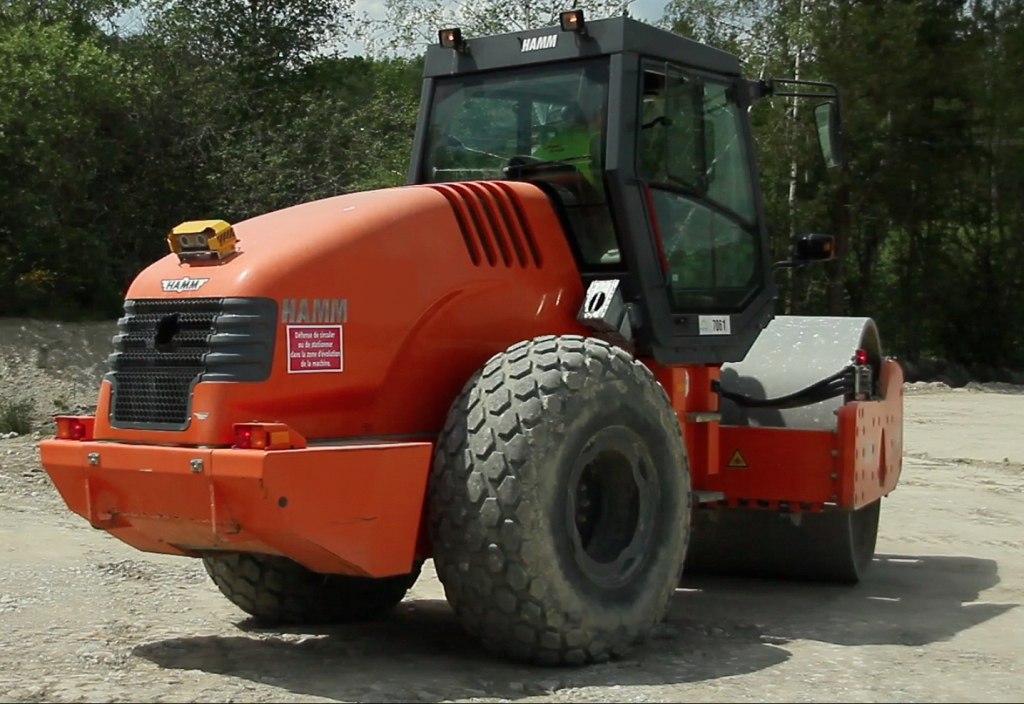
Hamm compactor

=== Kleemann GmbH ===
Located in Göppingen in Baden-Württemberg, KLEEMANN GmbH manufactures crushing and screening plants. It is part of Wirtgen Group since 2006.

=== Benninghoven GmbH & Co. KG ===
BENNINGHOVEN GmbH & Co. KG, located in Wittlich in Rheinland-Pfalz, is one of the largest recycling and asphalt mixing plant manufacturer in Germany. The company belongs to Wirtgen Group since 2014.

== Local production sites ==
=== Ciber ===
Ciber Equipamentos Rodoviários is Wirtgen Group's local production facility for Latin America and completes the comprehensive product range with its own brand. The brand headquarter is located in the southern state of Rio Grande do Sul in Brazil, in the city of Porto Alegre. Ciber manufactures hot mix asphalt plants and pavers on five production lines. It also produces a model from the Wirtgen cold milling machine line and a Hamm roller, each of which are adapted to the requirements of the local market.

=== Wirtgen China ===
The local production facility for China is established in Langfang, near Beijing. The production range includes selected models of WIRTGEN cold milling machines, VÖGELE road pavers and HAMM rollers. Around 380 employees work in an area of 200.000 m^{2}.

=== Wirtgen India ===
The new head office of Wirtgen India is located in the vicinity of Pune, an industrial center in the northwest of India. 672 employees work in the 129,100m² production area, producing two models of Hamm single-drum model 311 and multi-drum model HD99 compactors, Kleemanscreens and Vogele pavers

== Media gallery ==
Wirtgen Group at EXCON 2025, BIEC
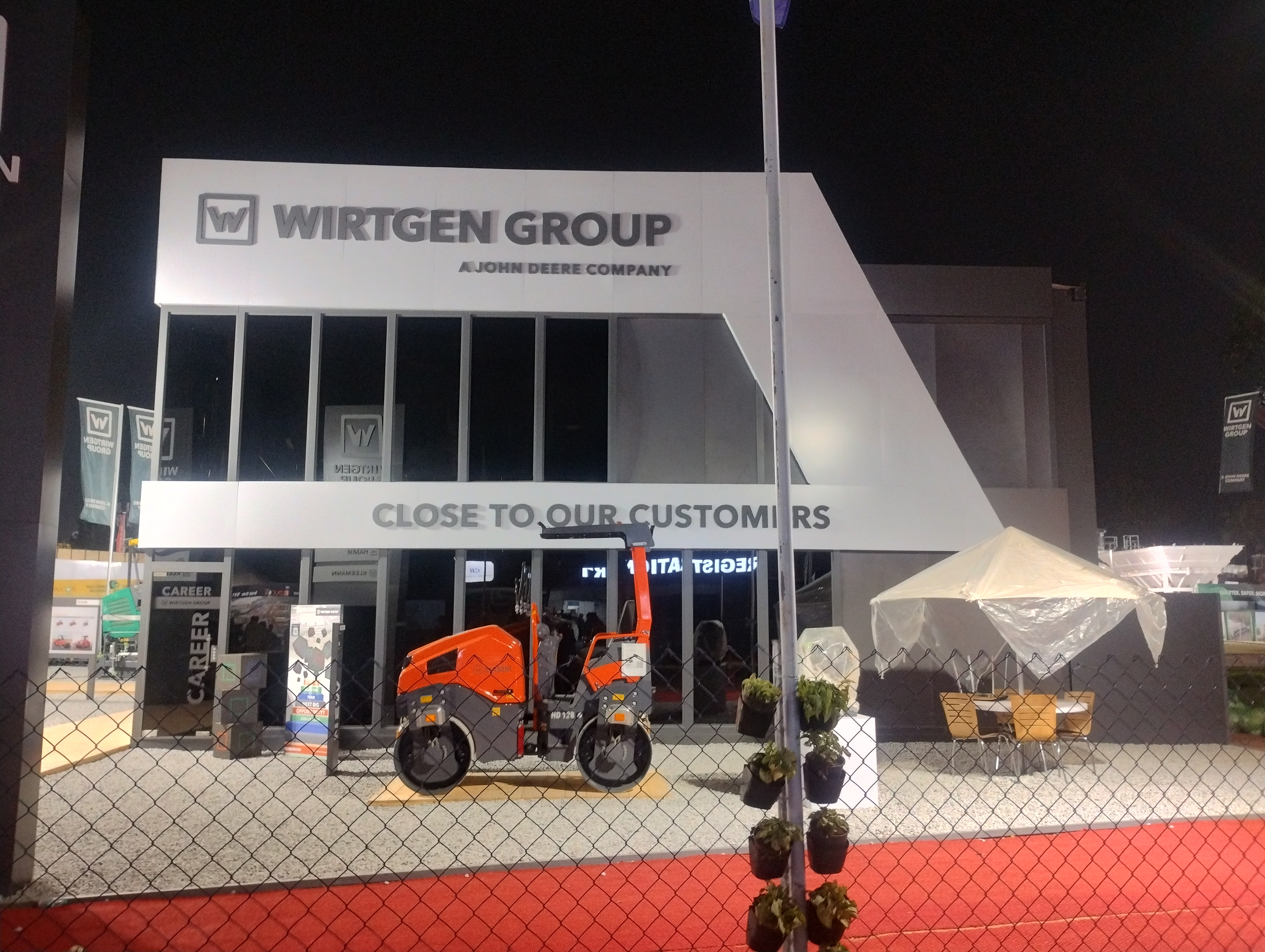

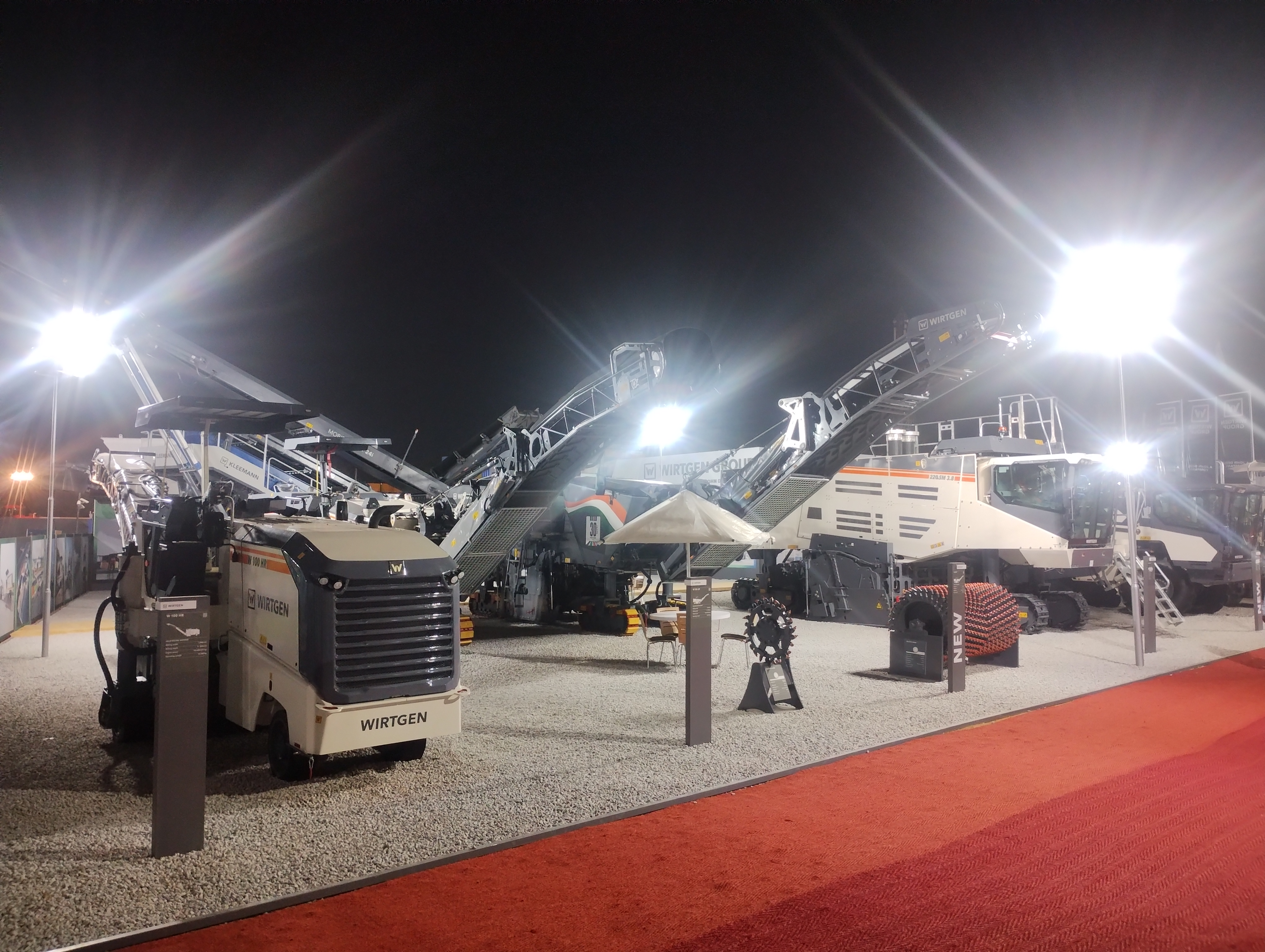

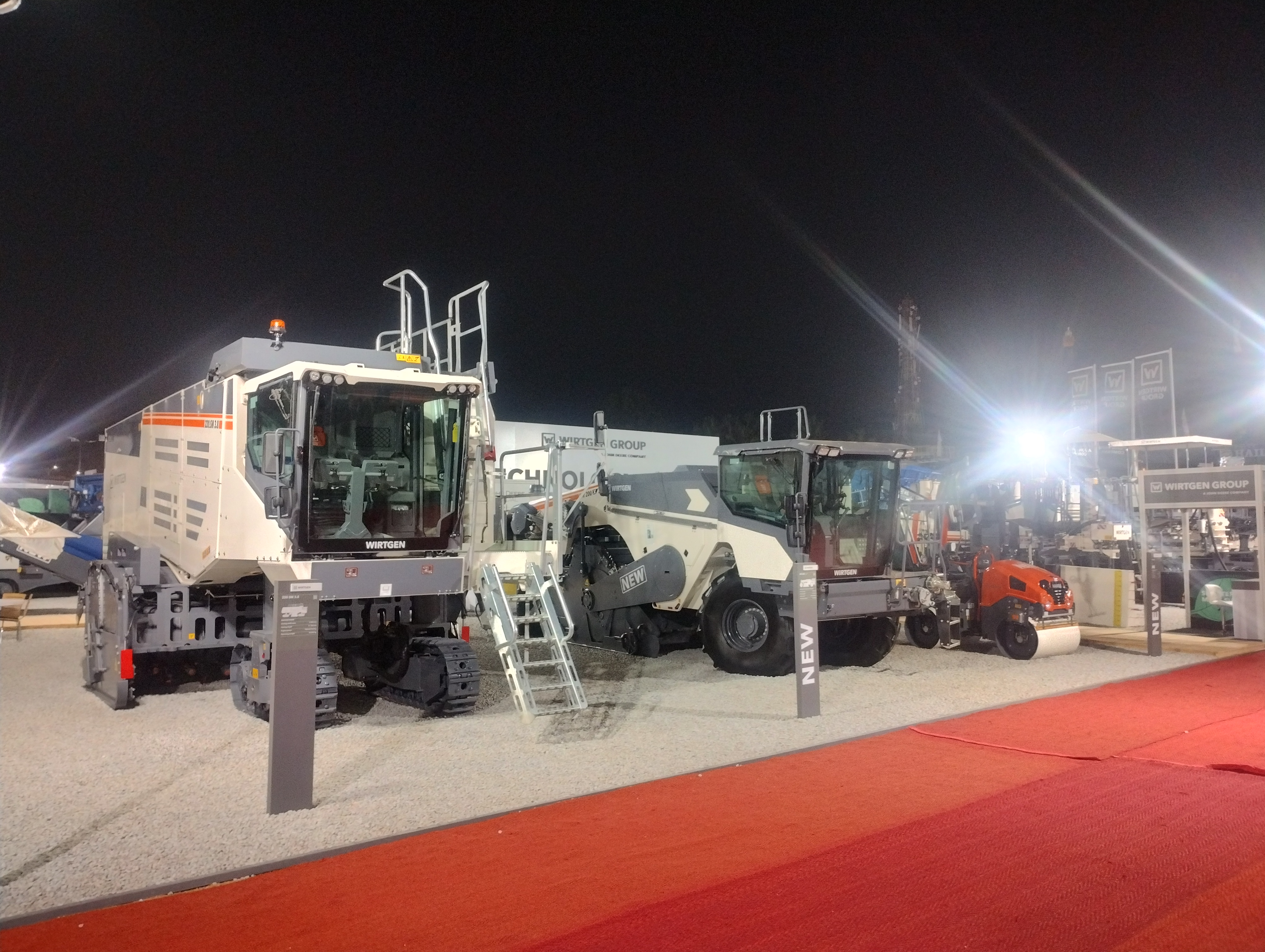
