= Soil stabilizer =

Soil stabilizer may refer to:

- Soil cement, a mix of pulverized natural soil with small amount of Portland cement and water
- Cellular confinement, a honeycomb-like plastic soil stabilizer
- Soil stabilization, a way of improving the weight bearing capabilities of sub-soils, sands, and other waste materials
- Soil stabilizer (vehicle), a machine used to make soil cement
