= Hamm AG =

German road roller manufacturer

HAMM AG
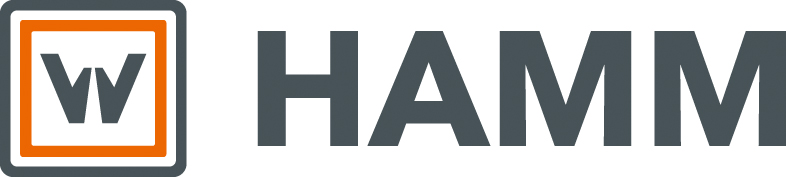

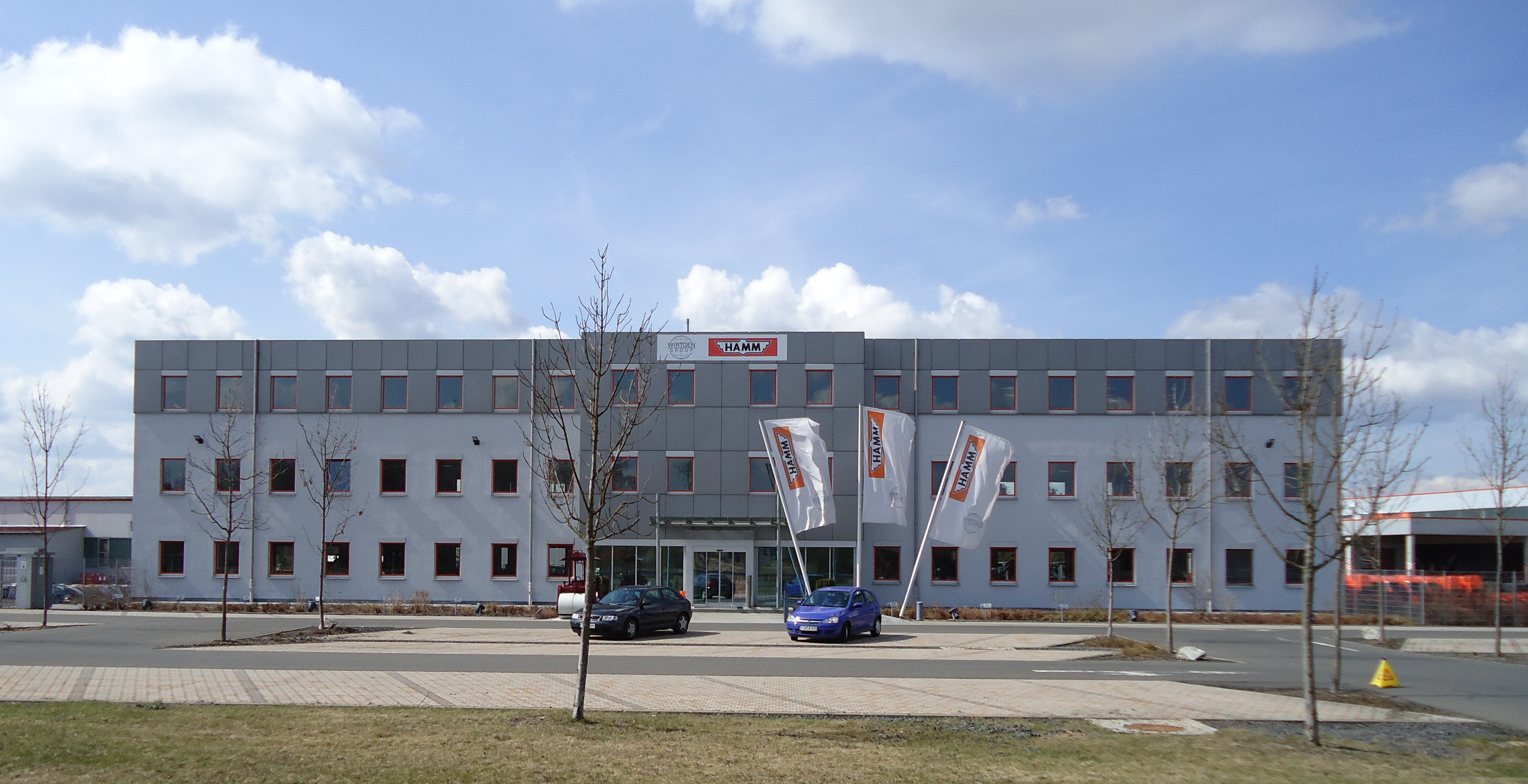
- Administration building of Hamm AG
- Type: Aktiengesellschaft
- Industry: Heavy equipment
- Founded: 1878
- Founder: Franz Hamm, Anton Hamm
- Headquarters: Tirschenreuth, Germany
- Area served: Worldwide
- Key people: Reinhold Baisch, Stefan Klumpp
- Products: road rollers
- Revenue: €343 million (2015)
- Number of employees: ca. 900 (Dec. 2015)
- Parent: Wirtgen Group

Hamm AG is a German worldwide manufacturer and marketer of road rollers based in Tirschenreuth, Germany. It is a subsidiary of Wirtgen Group.

== History ==
Brothers Anton and Franz Hamm, who were gunsmiths, founded the company in 1878 to build agricultural equipment. The company built their first diesel-powered road roller in 1911, from a design by a second-generation Hamm, Hans Hamm. This was at a time when most rollers where steam powered. In 1928, the company abandoned all other product lines to concentrate on road rollers. Hamm produces the first all-wheel drive-all-wheel steering double-drum. The company introduced an all-wheel steering and all-wheel drive rubber-wheeled roller in 1963, and then rolled out its oscillating vibratory roller in 1989.

In 1999, the Wirtgen Group GmbH announced that it would purchase Hamm AG; the transaction was completed in March 2000.

== Media gallery ==
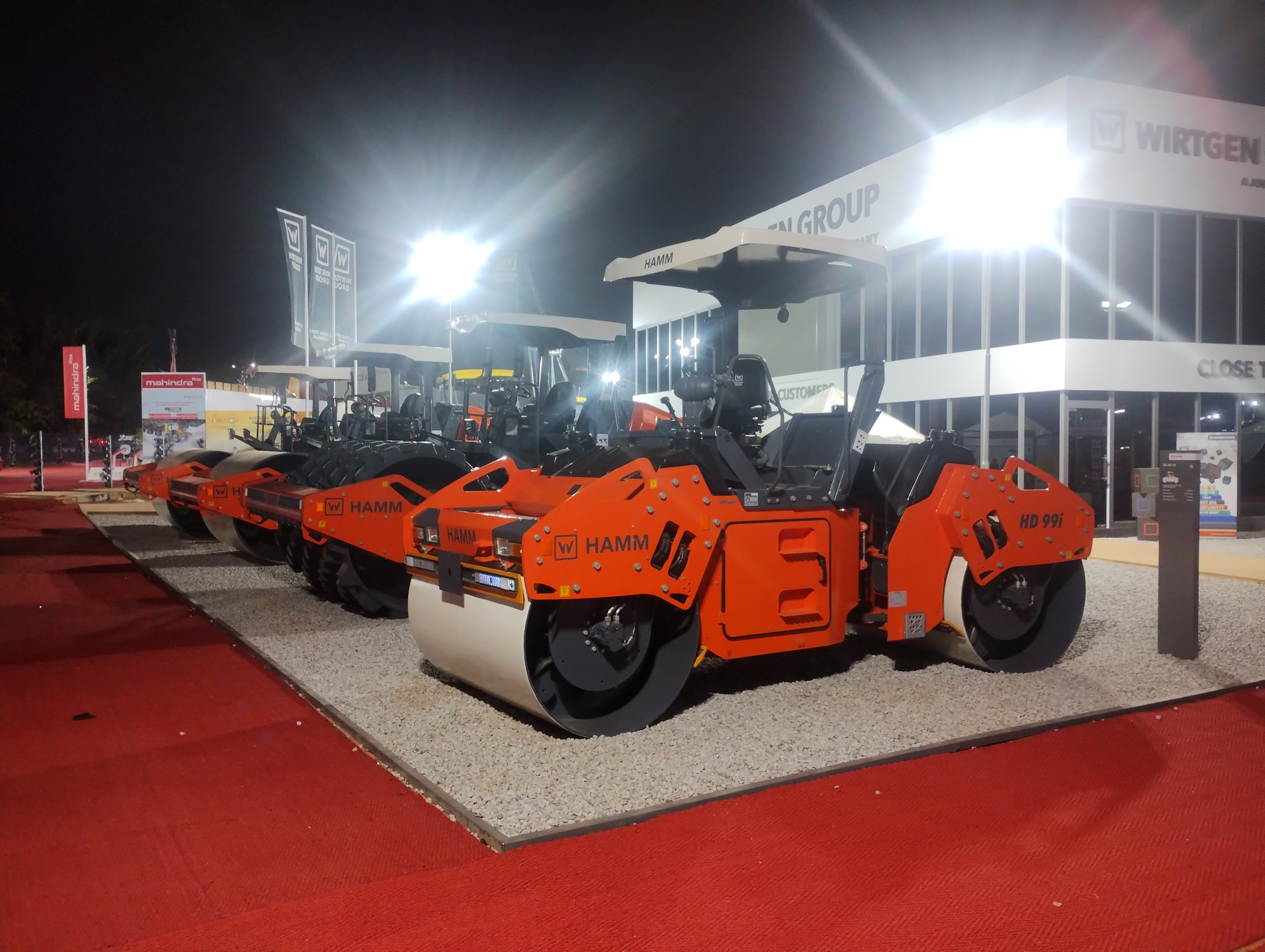
Hamm vehicles at EXCON 2025, BIEC

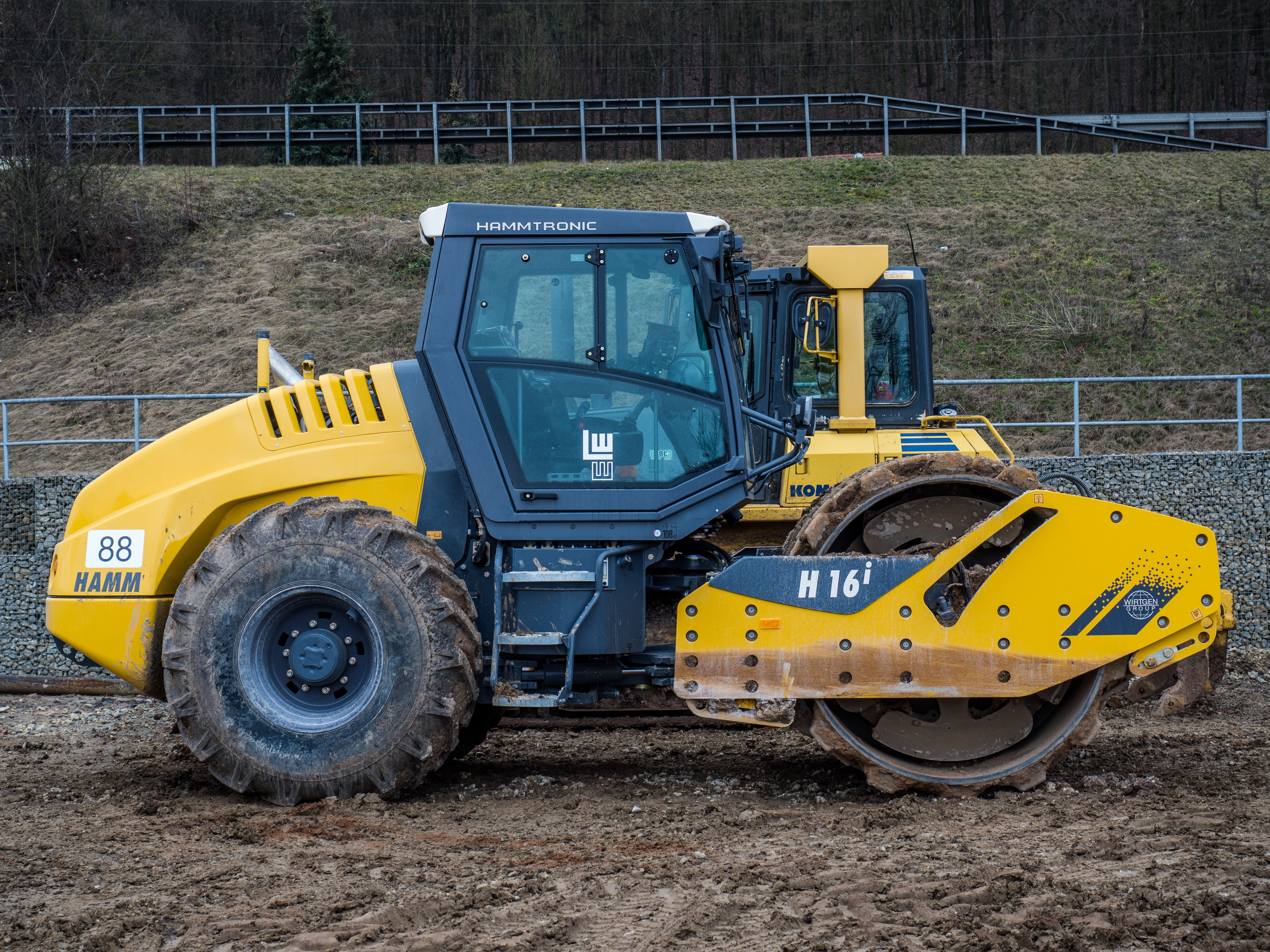
Hammtronic H16i

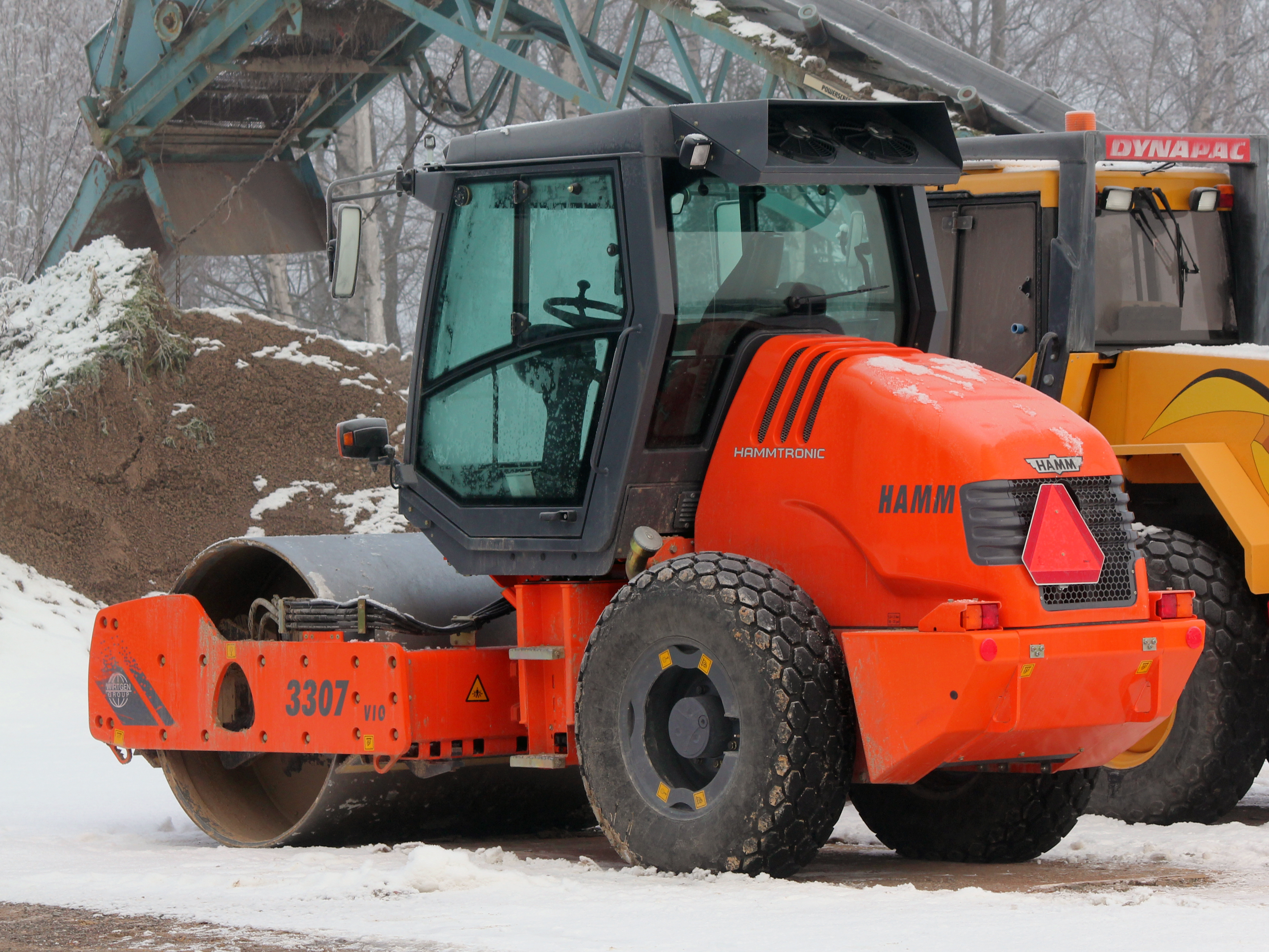
Hamm 3307
