= Benninghoven =

Benninghoven GmbH & Co. KG
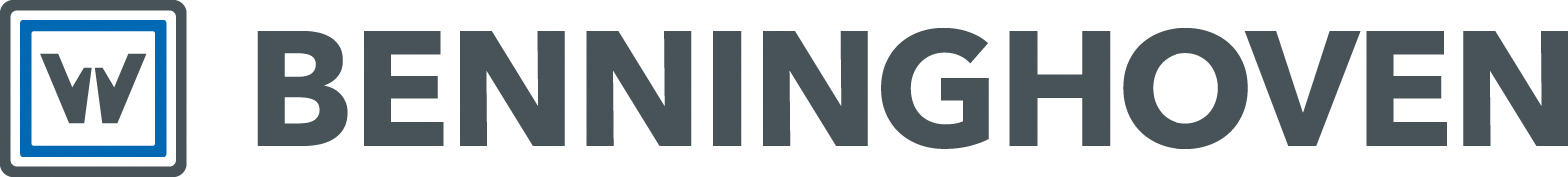
- Company type: GmbH & Co. KG
- Industry: Heavy equipment
- Founded: 1909
- Founder: Otto Benninghoven
- Headquarters: Mülheim an der Mosel, Germany
- Key people: Elmar Egli, Martin Kühn
- Products: Asphalt mixing plants, Bitumen technology, Granulating technology
- Revenue: €200 million
- Number of employees: approx. 650 (2021)
- Parent: Wirtgen Group
- Website: www.benninghoven.com

The Benninghoven GmbH & Co. KG is a German company based in Mülheim an der Mosel that manufactures and supplies asphalt mixing plants, machines and services to the construction industry.

The company was established in 1909 by Otto Benninghoven in Hilden. It started with the production of gear wheels and various machinery. At the beginning of the 1950s the company started to produce industrial burners. At the beginning of the 1960s it entered the asphalt mixing industry, the first products being burners, dryers and bitumen systems. In 2007 the company employed around 600 people.
