= Full depth recycling =

Method of recycling asphalt

Full depth recycling or full depth reclamation (FDR) is a process that rebuilds worn out asphalt pavements by recycling the existing roadway.

== Processes ==
Old asphalt and base materials are pulverized using a specialized machine called a reclaimer. On top of the pulverized material, water is added to reach the optimal moisture content for compaction and then a variety of materials, such as dry cement, lime, fly ash, or asphalt emulsion are incorporated for stabilization. A reclaimer is used again to mix all the materials. After shaping and grading, the new base is compacted to produce a strong, durable base for either an asphalt or concrete surface.

Since this method recycles the materials in situ, there is no need to haul in aggregate or haul out old material for disposal. The vehicle movements are reduced and there is no need for detours since it can be done under traffic, making this process more convenient for local residents.

FDR with cement saves money while preserving natural resources by using existing materials and conserving virgin aggregates. The road performance is improved through better stabilization, building a stronger, low-maintenance road that will last for many years.

With proper engineering and testing protocols the FDR process provides a design life-cycle of 30 years. FDR is a manufacturing process and not an installation. Other pavement materials, such as concrete, asphalt, or aggregate base go through a rigorous quality control program that meets a qualified standard prior to site delivery and contractor installation. The FDR process requires the same level of understanding and product controls during lab testing and field verification to meet long-term performance goals.

== See also ==
- Road recycler
