= Minerbio =

- Comune
- Comune di Minerbio
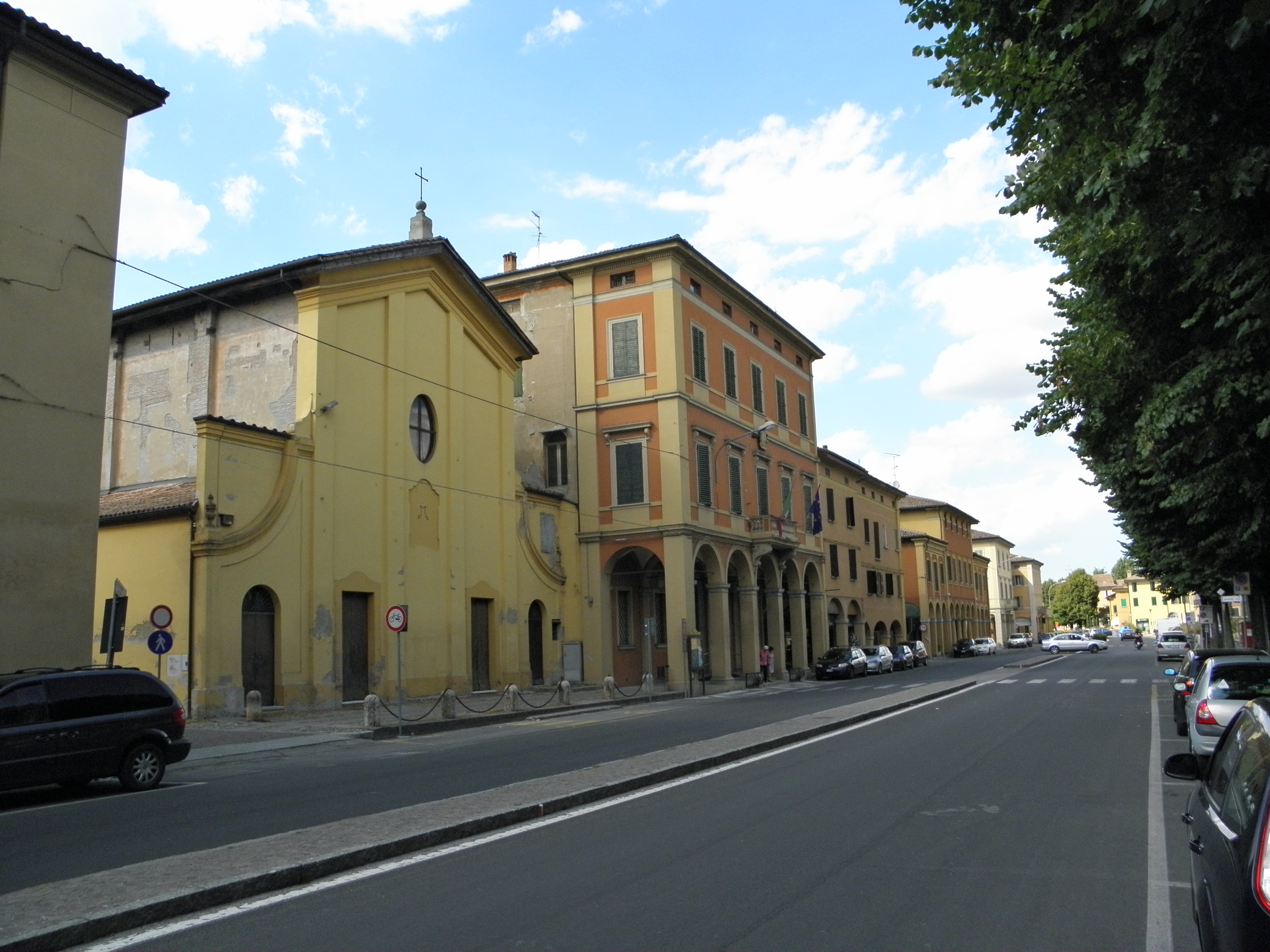
- Church of the Nativity and the municipal office

- Map of comune of Minerbio

- Location within Italy Location within Emilia-Romagna
- Coordinates: 44°37′N 11°29′E
- Country: Italy
- Region: Emilia-Romagna
- Metropolitan city: Bologna (BO)
- Frazioni: Ca' De' Fabbri, Capo d'Argine, San Martino in Soverzano (o dei Manzoli), San Giovanni in Triario, Spettoleria, Tintoria

Government
  - Mayor: Roberta Bonori

Area
  - Total: 43.07 km^{2} (16.63 sq mi)
- Elevation: 16 m (52 ft)

Population (31 December 2024)
  - Total: 8,990
  - Density: 209/km^{2} (541/sq mi)
- Demonym: Minerbiesi
- Time zone: UTC+1 (CET)
  - Summer (DST): UTC+2 (CEST)
- Postal code: 40061
- Dialing code: 051
- Website: Official website

Minerbio (Eastern Bolognese: Mnirbi or Mnérbi) is a comune (municipality) in the Metropolitan City of Bologna in the northern-central Italian region Emilia-Romagna, located about 15 kilometres (9 mi) northeast of Bologna.

Minerbio borders the following municipalities: Baricella, Bentivoglio, Budrio, Granarolo dell'Emilia and Malalbergo.

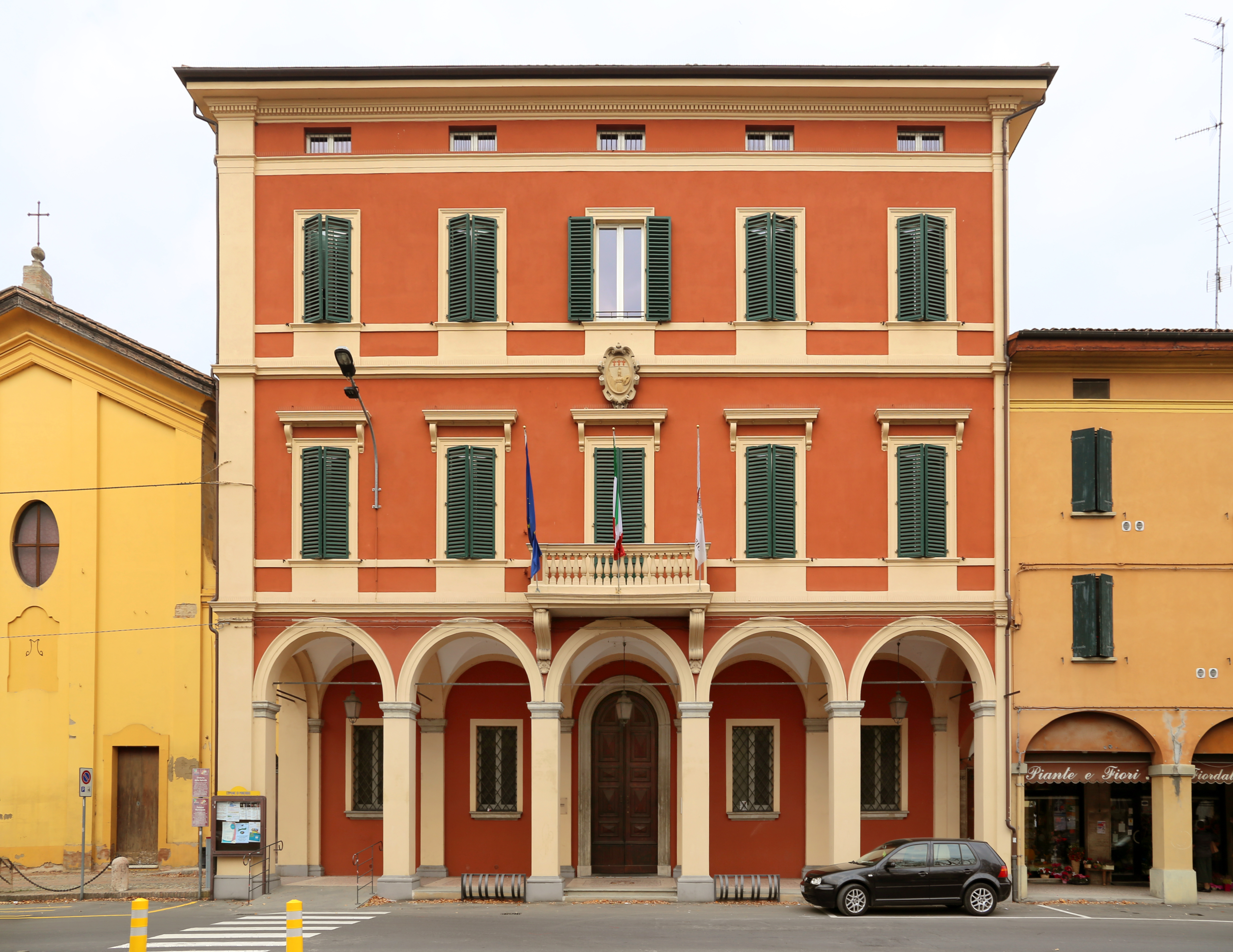

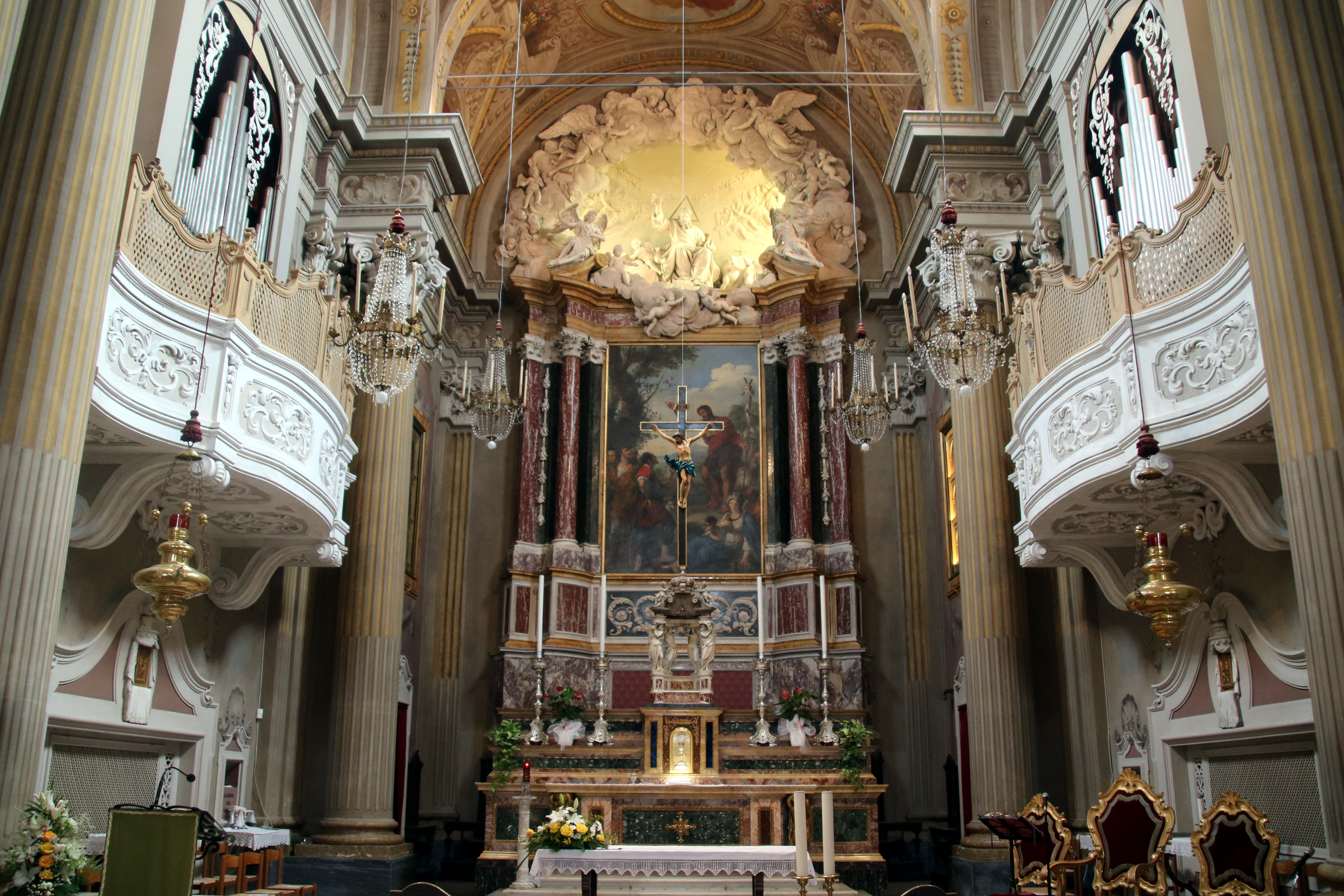
Church of San Giovanni Battista in Minerbio

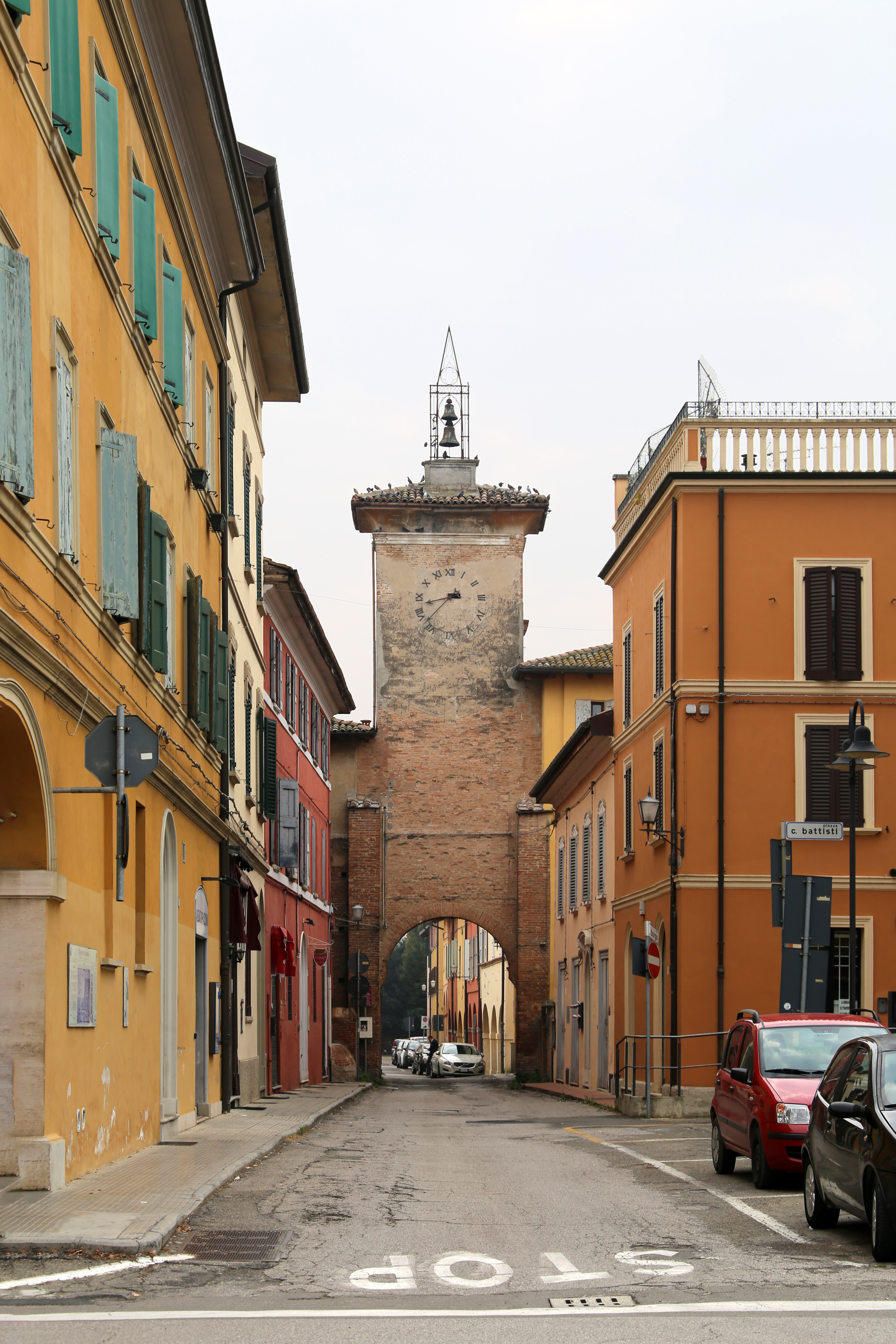
Tower of the Clock in Minerbio

== Monuments and places of interest ==
Some of the featuring places to visit in Minerbio are:

- Biotopes and environmental restoration of Budrio and Minerbio: nature
- Manzoli Castle in Soverzano: civil architecture
- Isolani Fortress: military architecture
- Church of St. John the Baptist: religious architecture

== Twin towns ==
Minerbio is twinned with:

- Camugnano, Italy
- Hirrlingen, Germany
- Hajós, Hungary

== See also ==
- Bitelli
- Minerbium, Latin name of Minervino Murge, town and former bishopric in Apulia
