= Bitelli =

Construction machinery manufacturer

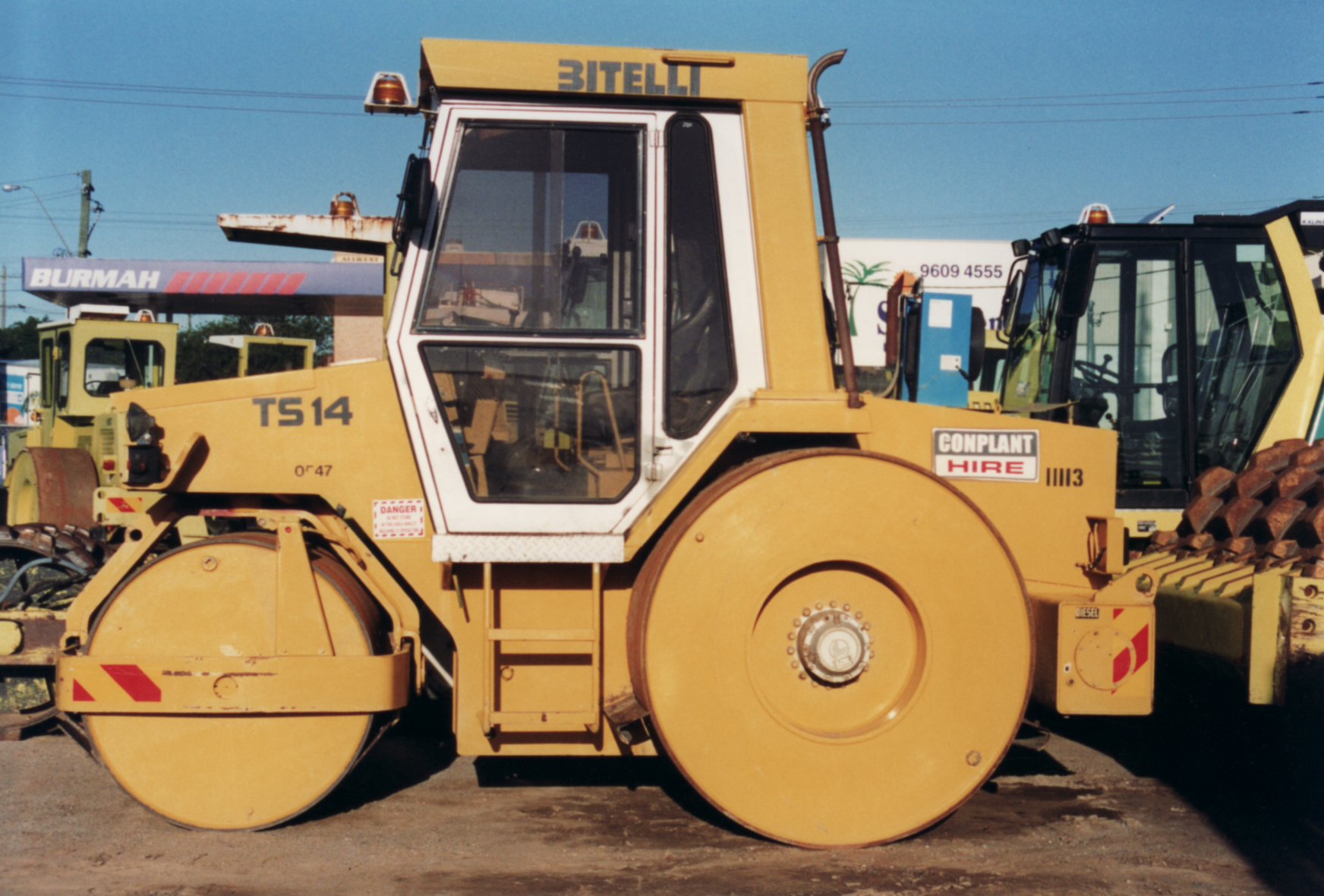
A Bitelli three point road roller

Bitelli was an engineering company located in Minerbio, Bologna, Italy - the largest and, perhaps best known, Italian construction machinery firm. Beppino Bitelli produced his first three wheel roller in 1933 although it was not until 1957 that the Bitelli Road Mechanics company was formed. Tandem rollers were soon added and in 1969 the first single drum rollers were manufactured. In 1978, Bitelli built its first paving machine and, during the 1980s, road profilers and soil stabilizers were added to the line of road machines.

== Shareholder company ==
In 1980, Bitelli became a shareholder company and the five brothers and sisters took over control of the business. These were Gino Bitelli, Romolo Bitelli, Alessandro Bitelli, Luisa Bitelli and Maria Giovanna Bitelli. In 1995, Bitelli was divided into four main product categories across 5 continents and 45 countries.

- Asphalt Pavers 41.8%
- Cold planers 20.7%
- Single drum rollers 20.9%
- Tandem rollers 16.6%

== Sale to Caterpillar ==
On 2 May 2000, Bitelli was sold to Caterpillar and the Bitelli name disappeared from construction machinery. Some models were continued in the Caterpillar line such as the 200LE Cold Planer. But most others were discontinued including the road rollers and most of the asphalt pavers.

== Models ==
=== Pavers ===
- BB30 BB50 BB52
- BB632 BB642
- BB660
- BB670
- BB621C BB651C BB671C BB681C BB781

=== Profilers ===
- SF100 SF140
- 200L 200LE 200R
- 202

=== Stabilizers ===
- ST200

=== Rollers ===
Single Drum

- C80 C100 C120 C170 C180

Three point rollers

- TS8 TS10 TS12 TS14

== Gallery ==
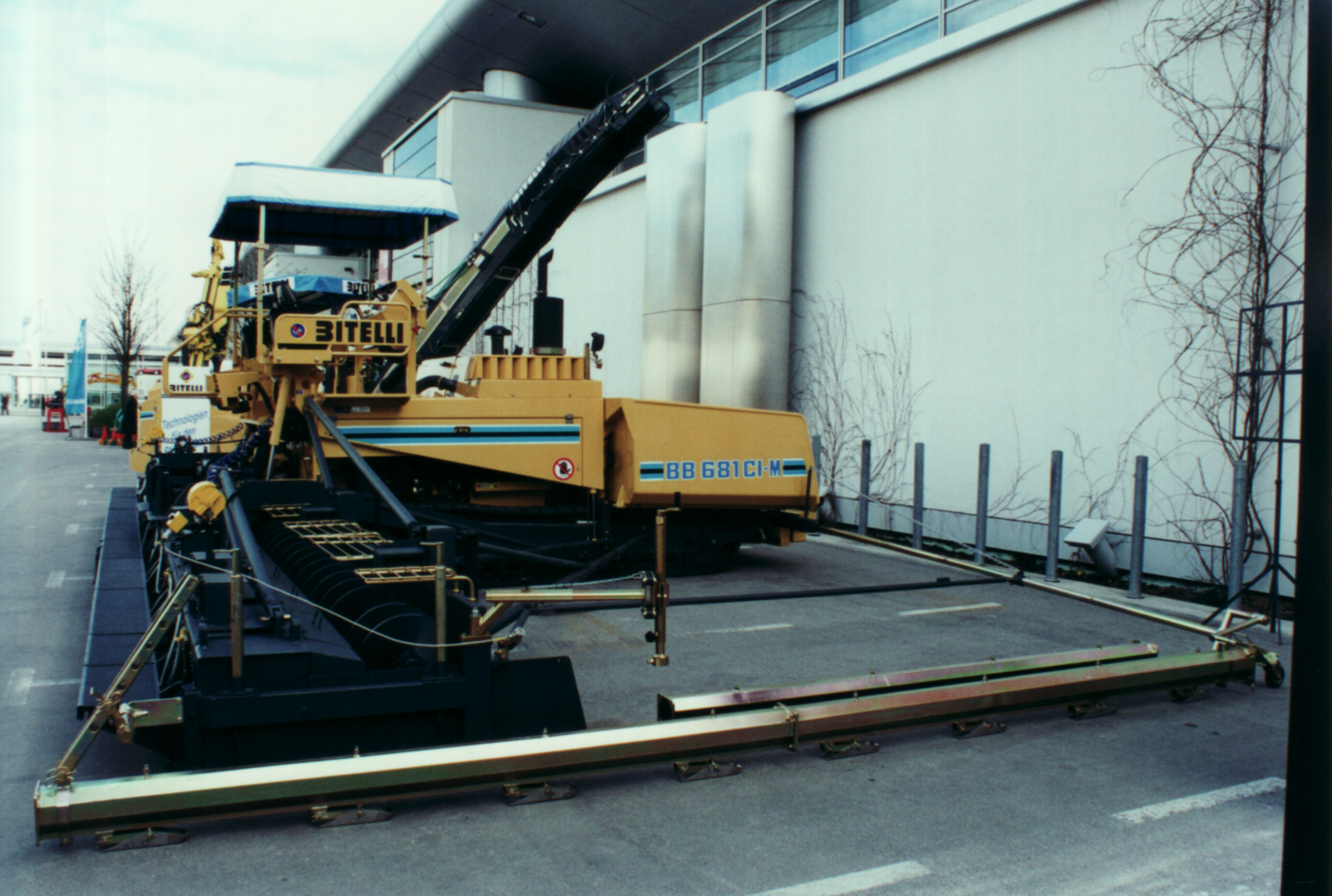
A Bitelli BB681D paver

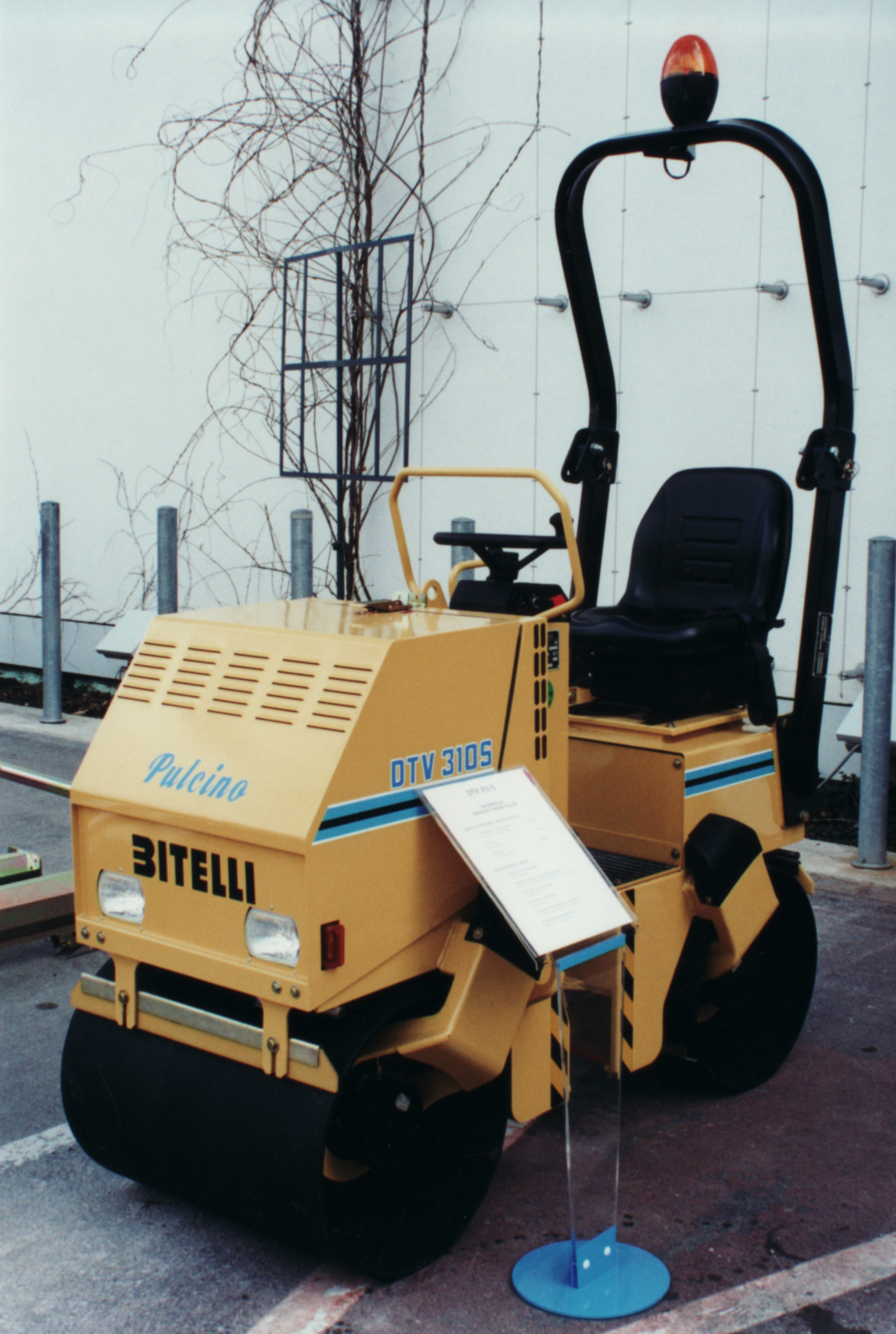
A Bitelli road roller

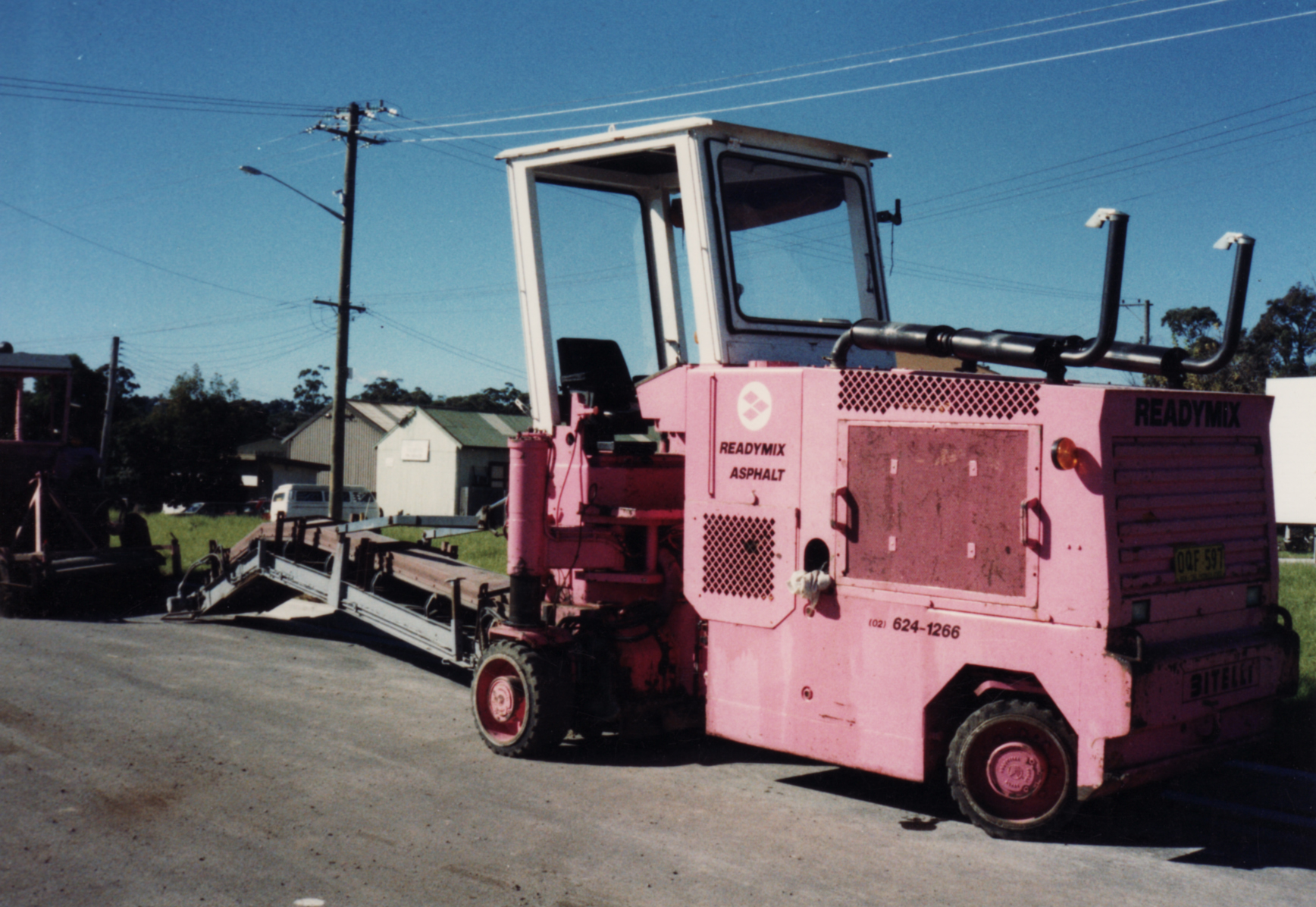
A Bitelli road profiler
