= Tirschenreuth =

- Town
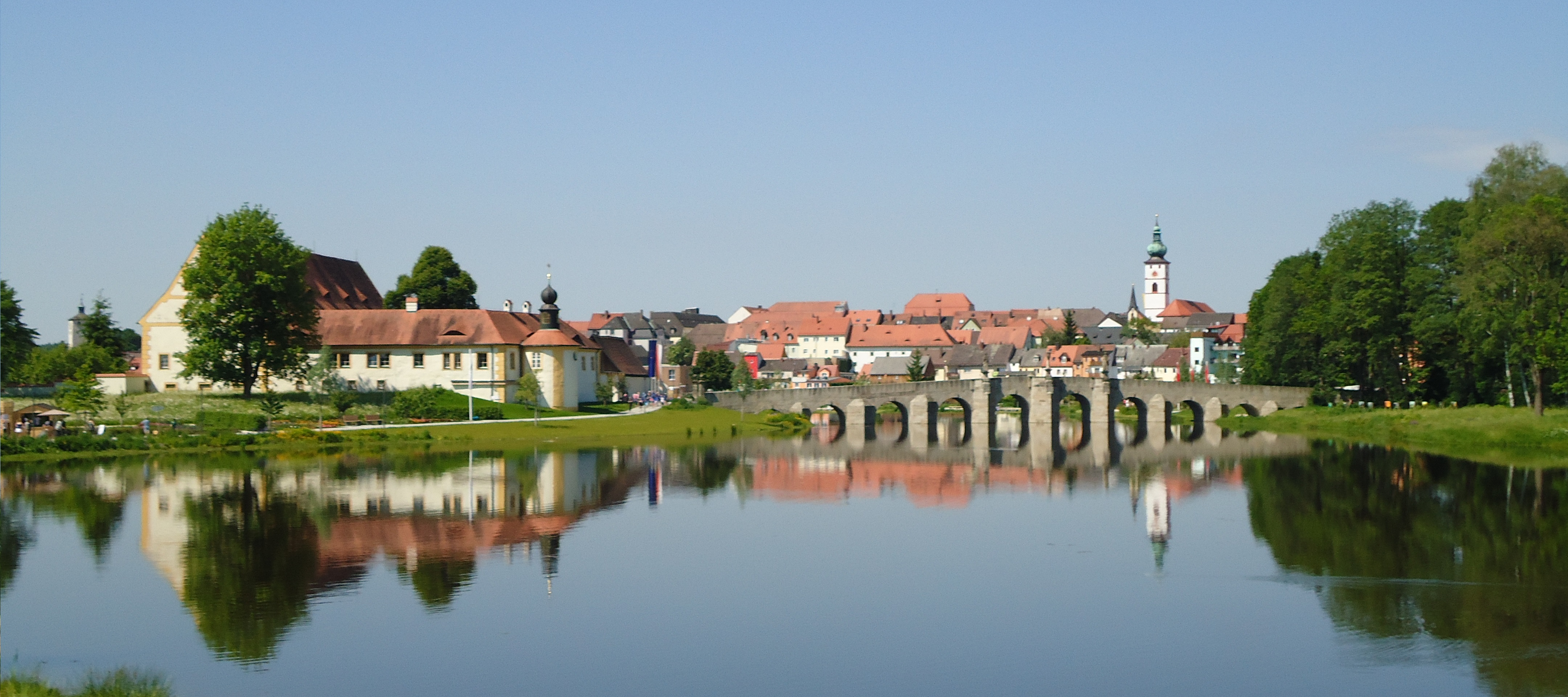
- Panorama of the Old Town of Tirschenreuth

- Flag Coat of arms

- Location of Tirschenreuth within Tirschenreuth district
- Interactive map of Tirschenreuth
- Location within Germany Location within Bavaria
- Coordinates: 49°53′N 12°20′E
- Country: Germany
- State: Bavaria
- Admin. region: Upper Palatinate
- District: Tirschenreuth

Government
  - Mayor (2020–26): Franz Stahl (CSU)

Area
  - Total: 103.95 km^{2} (40.14 sq mi)
- Elevation: 504 m (1,654 ft)

Population (2025-12-31)
  - Total: 8,467
  - Density: 81.45/km^{2} (211.0/sq mi)
- Time zone: UTC+01:00 (CET)
  - Summer (DST): UTC+02:00 (CEST)
- Postal codes: 95643
- Dialling codes: 09631
- Vehicle registration: TIR, KEM
- Website: www.stadt-tirschenreuth.de

Tirschenreuth (German pronunciation: [ˈtɪʁʃn̩ʁɔʏt]; Northern Bavarian: Dirschnrad, Diascharad) is the capital city of the district of Tirschenreuth. It is located in the northeast of Bavaria, very close to the Czech-Bavarian border.

== Geography ==
Tirschenreuth is located in the north of Upper Palatinate administrative region, around 75 miles north of Regensburg and 35 miles east of Bayreuth.

== Incorporations ==
The following villages were incorporated in Tirschenreuth

- Großklenau
- Kleinklenau
- Brunn
- Gründlbach
- Haid
- Höfen
- Hohenwald
- Kleinkonreuth
- Lengenfeld
- Lohnsitz
- Marchaney
- Matzersreuth
- Mooslohe
- Pilmersreuth a. d. Straße
- Pilmersreuth a. Wald
- Rosall
- Rothenbürg
- Sägmühle
- Wondreb
- Wondrebhammer
- Zeidlweid
- Ziegelhütte

== History ==
Until the German Mediatisation in 1803, Tirschenreuth was part of the possessions of the Cistercian Abbey Waldsassen. It received its town charter from Waldsassen's abbot Johann V. in 1364. Originally the Waldsassen Abbey and its possessions were direct fiefs of the Holy Roman Emperor. After this status ended during the 16th century, Tirschenreuth first became part of the Electorate of the Palatinate, then part of Bavaria. It became capital of the district of the same name. In 1972, when the segmenting of Bavarian districts was reformed, the district of Tirschenreuth was expanded with the former district of Kemnath.

== Economy ==
One well-known company that resides in Tirschenreuth is Hamm AG, a manufacturer of road rollers.

Tirschenreuth was famous for fine quality porcelain and vintage pieces are highly sought after by collectors, but its porcelain factory shut down years ago.

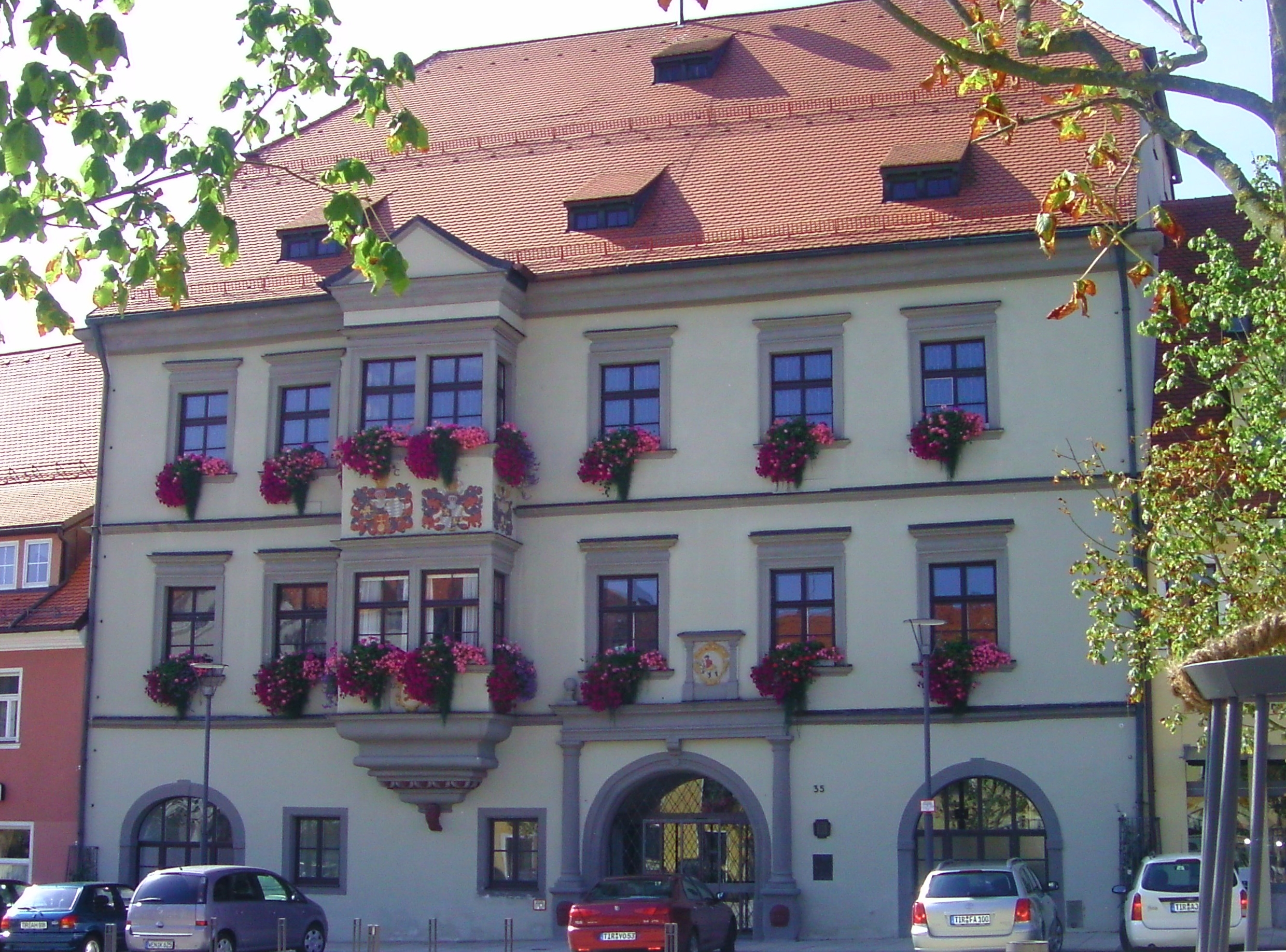
Town Hall

== Twin towns – sister cities ==
Tirschenreuth is twinned with:

- La Ville-du-Bois, France (2001)
- Planá, Czech Republic (2008)
- Lauf an der Pegnitz, Germany (2011)

Hirschau is also member of the so called "Kaolinstädtepartnerschaft". It connects cities, which are connected to the mineral Kaolin. The partnership was established in November 2004. Aside Hirschau the members of this partnership are the Bavarian cities Hirschau und Schnaittenbach, from Saxony Königswartha, Sornzig-Ablaß and the city Mügeln, Nová Role from the Czech Republic and Nowogrodziec from Poland.

== Notable residents ==
- Arnold Kriegstein, German-American neurologist and neuroscientist, was born there in 1949
- Johann Andreas Schmeller, groundbreaking Germanist, dialectologist, and philologist specializing in Bavarian dialect, was born there in 1785
