= Road recycler =

Transport engineering vehicle

Soil stabilizers and road recyclers are engineering vehicles that were once similar machines; however, they are now specialised pieces of road making machinery and have developed into different machines. Other terms that are sometimes used are: road profiler, road reclaimer, road miller, road planer and pavement profiler. They are used in the process of full depth recycling.

== Types of equipment ==
Different countries sometimes use different terminology and it becomes difficult to identify the difference between the machines and the processes involved.

=== Soil stabiliser ===
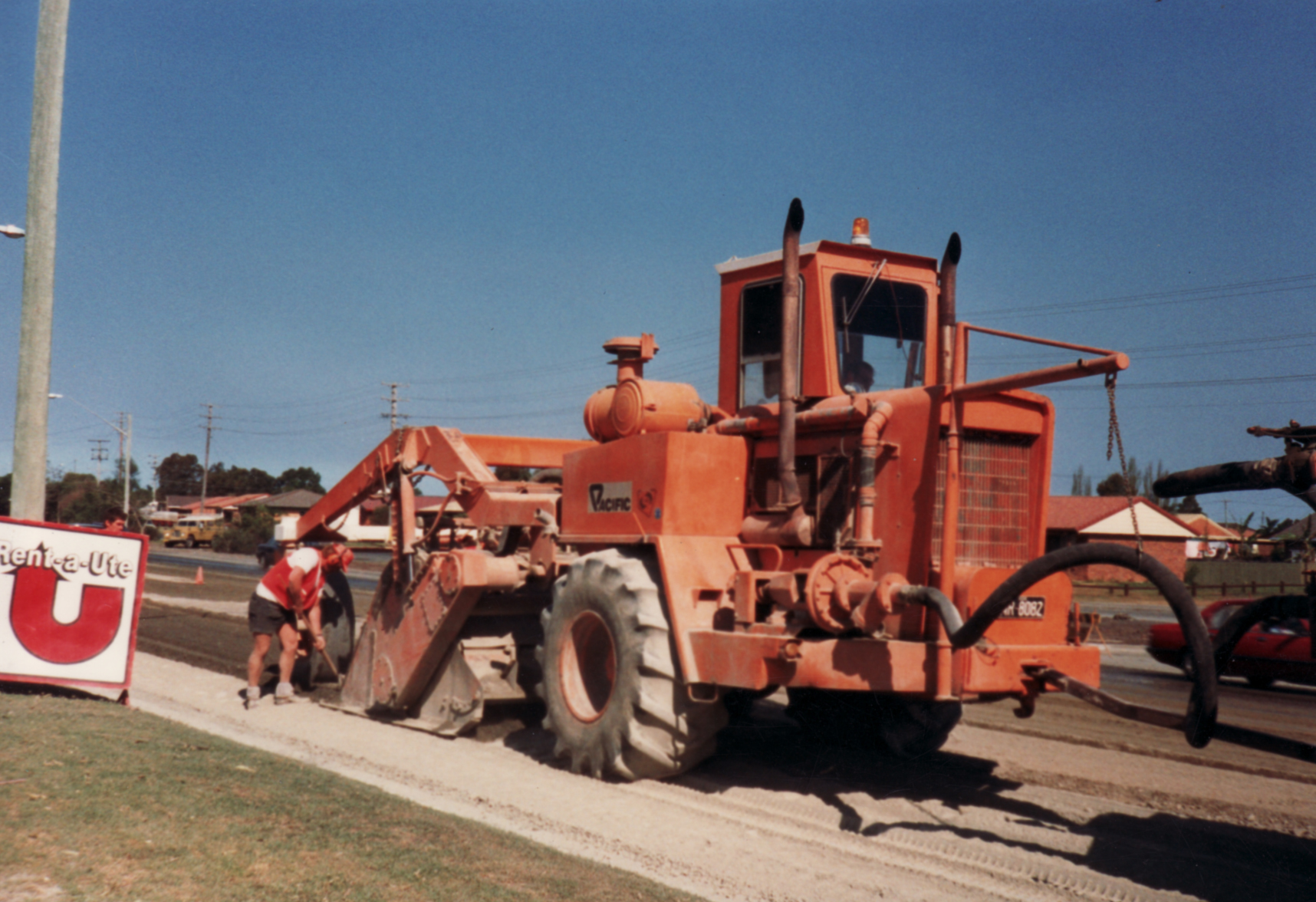
A soil stabilizer machine. The machine blends existing pavement with lime that has been spread on the surface. Water comes in via the big pipe at the front.

A soil stabiliser (also called a pulvimixer) is a construction vehicle with a powered metal drum that has rows of mixing blades or paddles. It makes soil cement by blending soil, a binder agent (usually Portland cement or lime) and water together with paddles in the mixing chamber instead of a concrete mixer and usually does not cut or mill hard or very thick asphalt or concrete. Modern soil stabilisers are more powerful and often use carbide tips instead of paddles. Some are called single pass soil stabilizers because they can make soil cement in one pass where some of these machines take up to four passes. In this way most soil stabilisers have become much more like road recyclers where they can also blend the old road surface in the mixture.

=== Road pavement mill ===
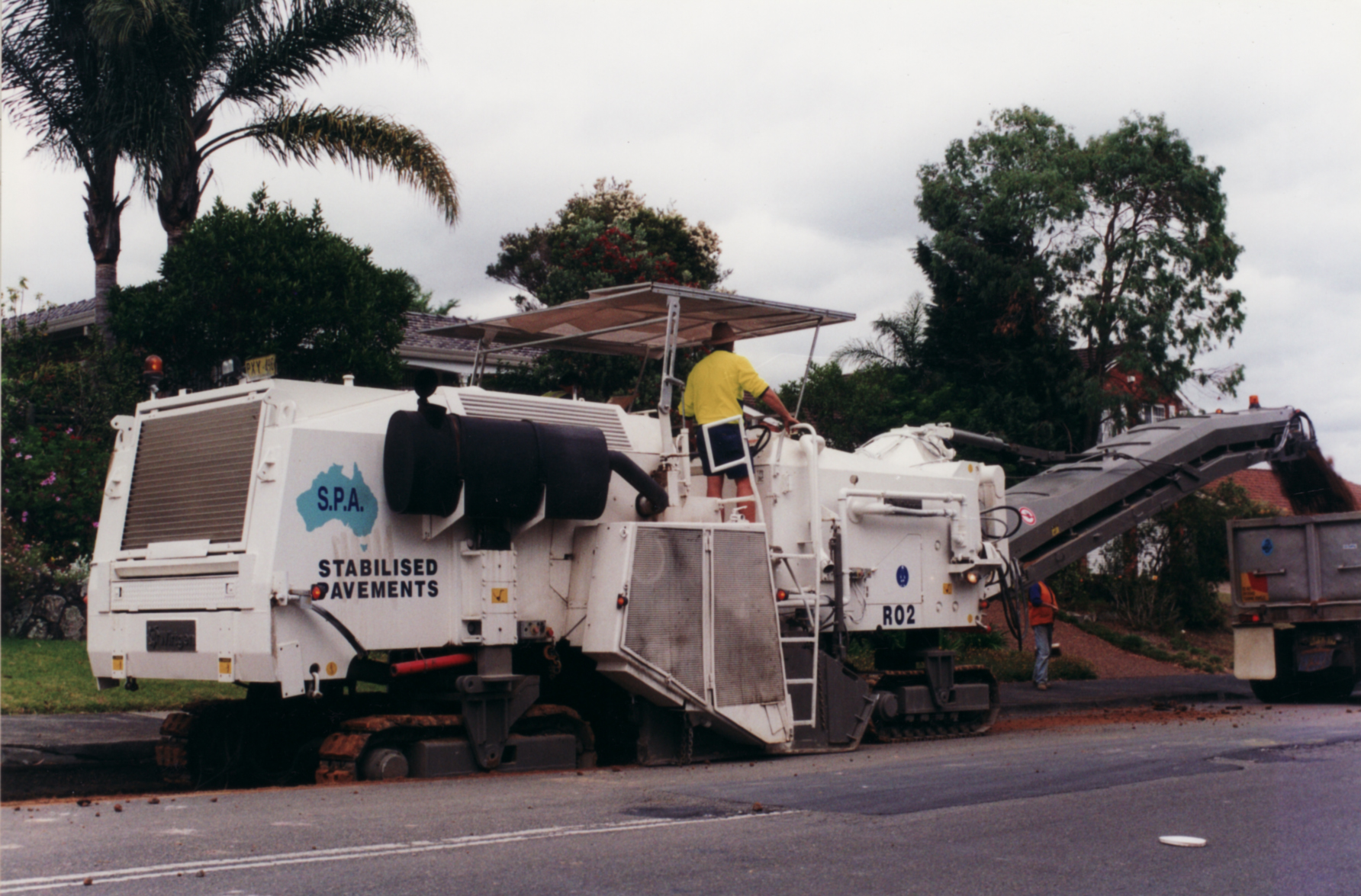
A Wirtgen road pavement profiler (mill) removes the top surface of the road so that a new one can be laid.

A road pavement mill is a construction vehicle with a powered metal drum that has rows of tungsten carbide tipped teeth that cut off the top surface of a paved concrete or asphalt road. Usually (since sustainability is now very important) extracts the material for recycling into new asphalt. In some applications the entire road pavement can be removed. The reasons for removal may be that the road surface has become damaged and needs replacing.

It is a very high-powered machine, with some using engines above 500 hp. It is usually mounted on four crawler tracks although sometimes on three crawler tracks or on wheels.

=== Road recycler ===
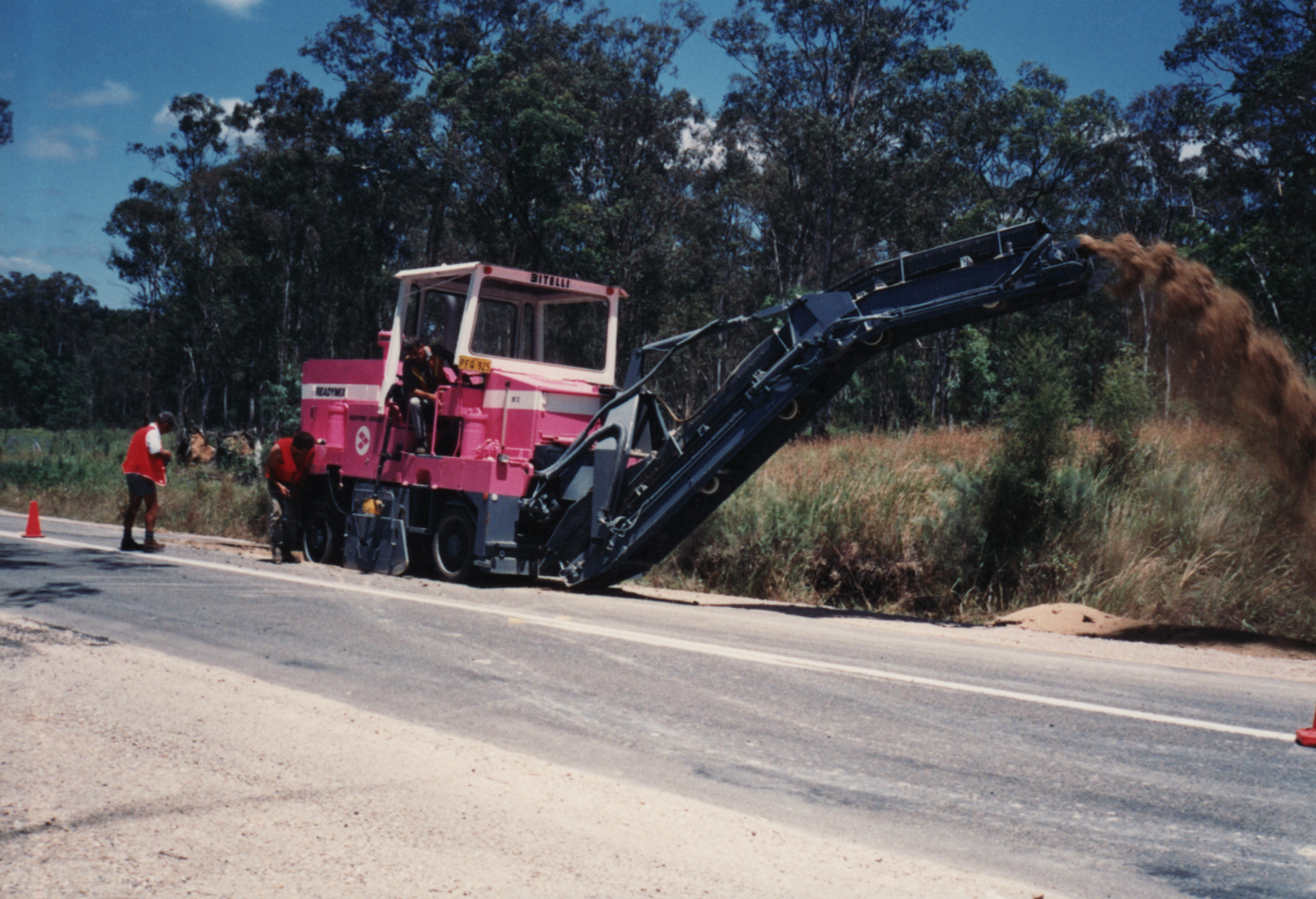
A Bitelli road pavement recycler on wheels. The material is not being recycled here but instead thrown to the side of the road.

A road recycler or road reclaimer is an asphalt pavement grinder or a combination grinder and soil stabilizer when it is equipped to blend cement, foamed asphalt and/or lime and water with the existing pavement (usually only very thin asphalt) to create a new, recycled road surface. It usually refers to the process of blending the asphalt road with a binder and base course in a single pass. In the photo below of the milling cutter drums, the front drum with many teeth would be from a pavement mill and would be used to remove very hard asphalt or concrete surfaces. The drums behind with less teeth would be from a road recycler, the teeth are placed in a chevron pattern to reduce the load on the motor. Only a few teeth are cutting at one time and this pattern of teeth placement also serves to auger the material to the centre where it can be picked up easily by a conveyor belt.

== Manufacturers ==
Key: SS = soil stabiliser; RM = road mill

- Amag (Germany) SS
- Bitelli (Italy) SS/RM – part of Caterpillar
- Bomag (Germany/USA) SS/RM
- Caterpillar Inc. (USA) SS/RM
- CMI Corporation (USA) SS/RM - part of Bomag America
- CMI Roadbuilding (USA) RM Resurrected from TEREX
- Dynapac (Sweden) SS/RM
- Ingersoll Rand (USA) RM – part of Volvo
- Marks (Germany) RM – disbanded
- Panien (France) SS
- Raygo (USA) SS/RM – part of Caterpillar
- Rex (USA) SS
- Roadtec (USA) SS/RM
- Wirtgen Group (Germany) SS/RM

== Gallery ==
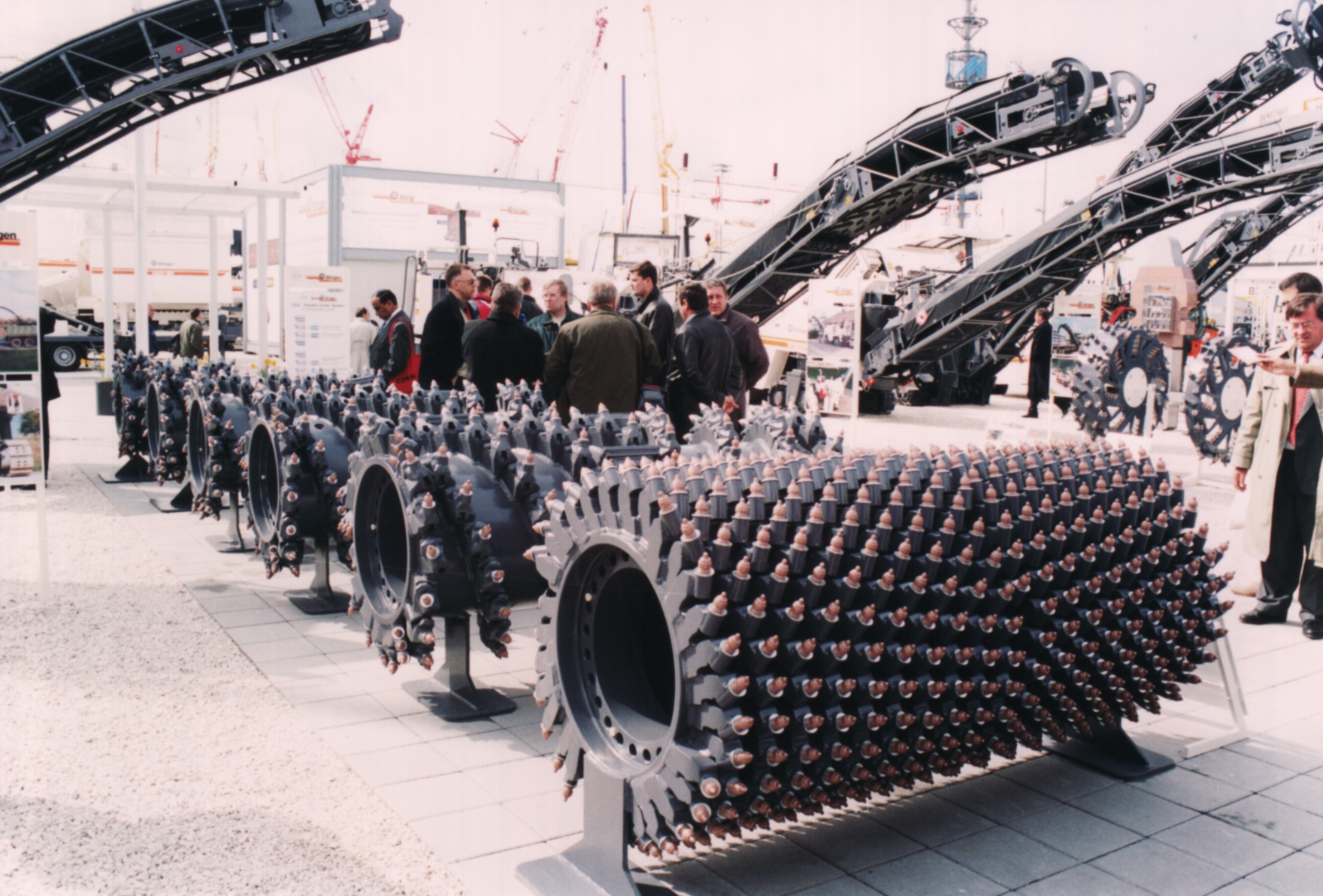
These tips are made of tungsten carbide and the drum rotates and mills away the road surface.

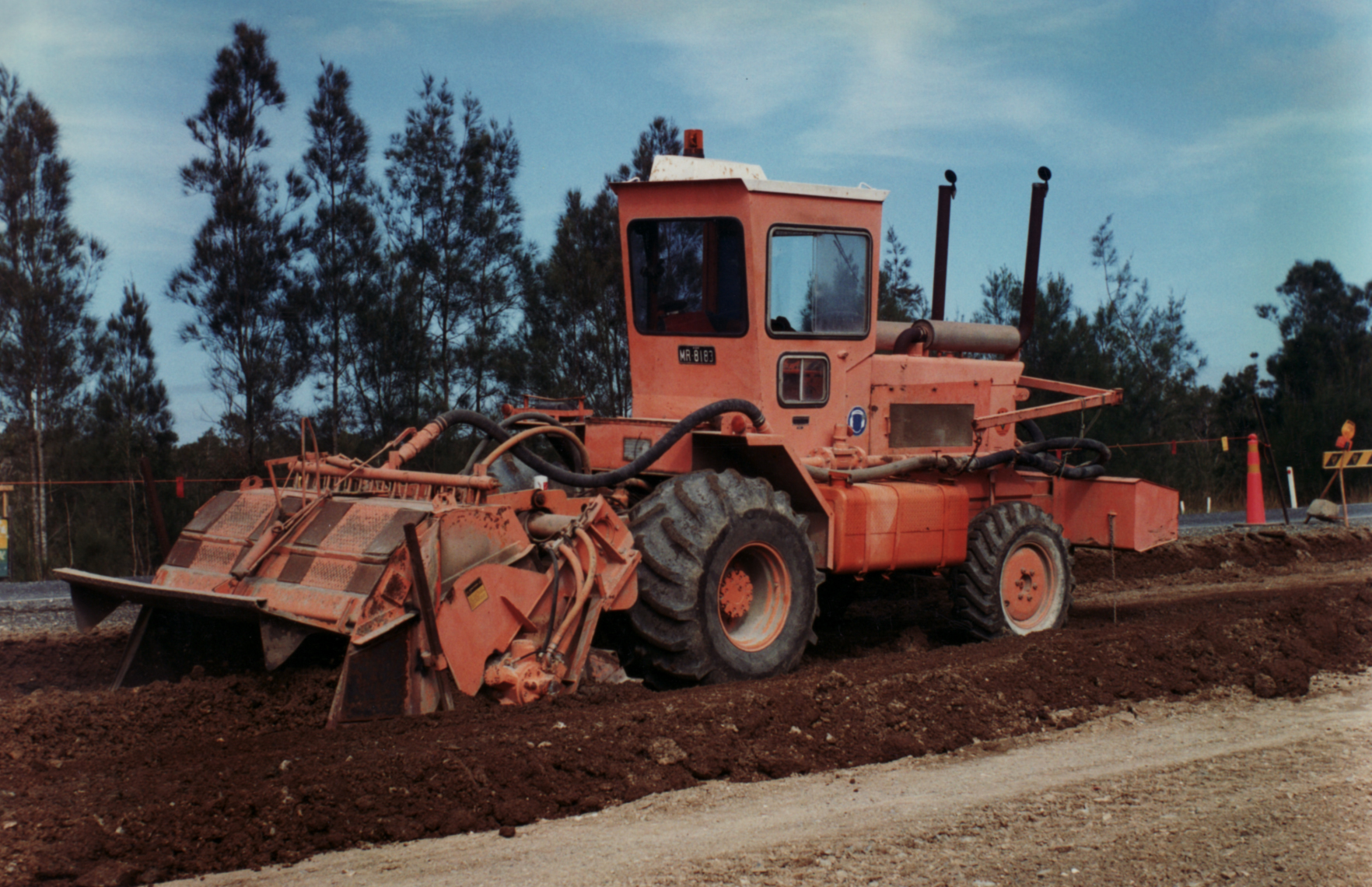
A Bomag MPH100 soil stabilizer aerating the soil ready for blending with lime

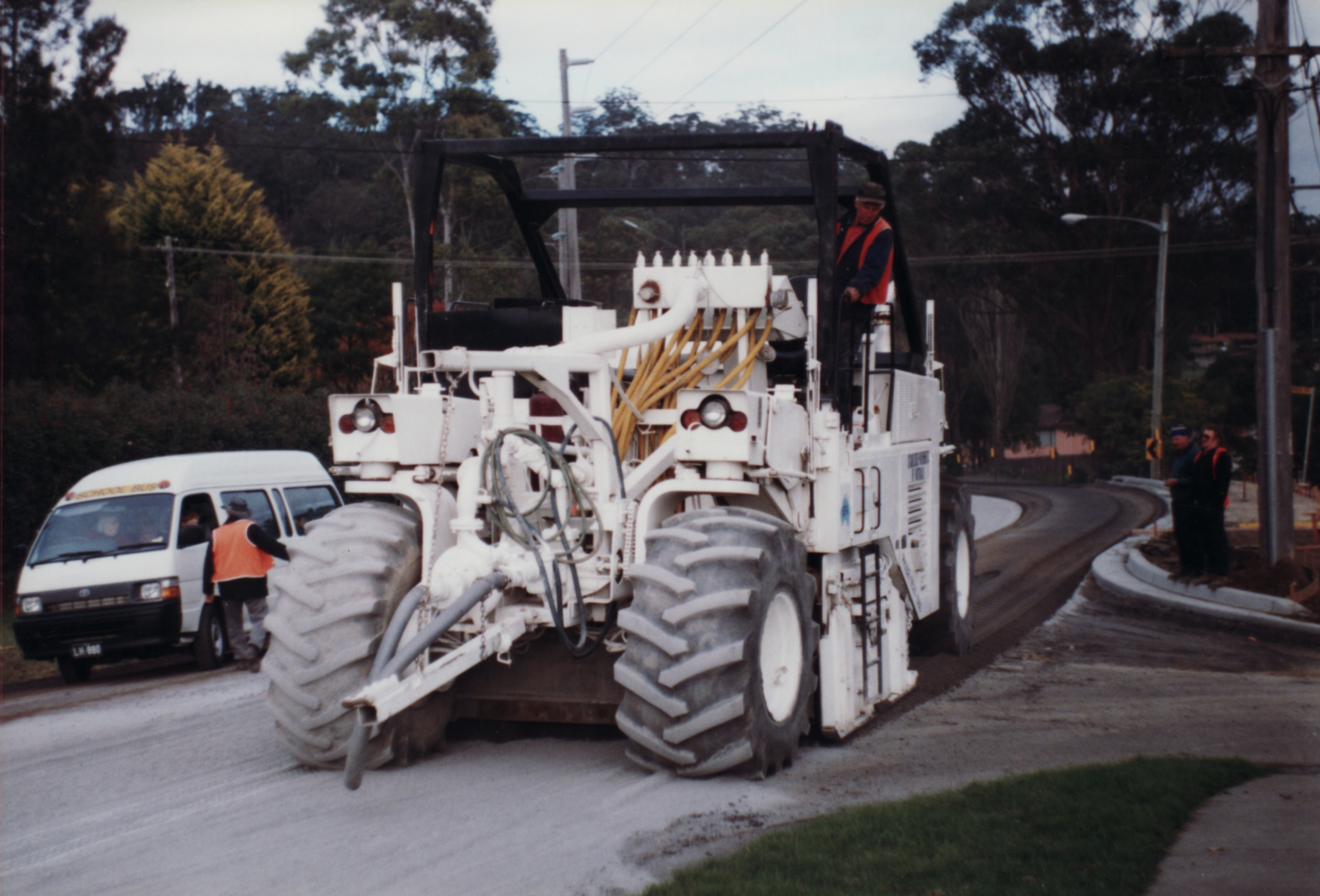
A CMI road recycler milling old road surface and blending lime in a single pass

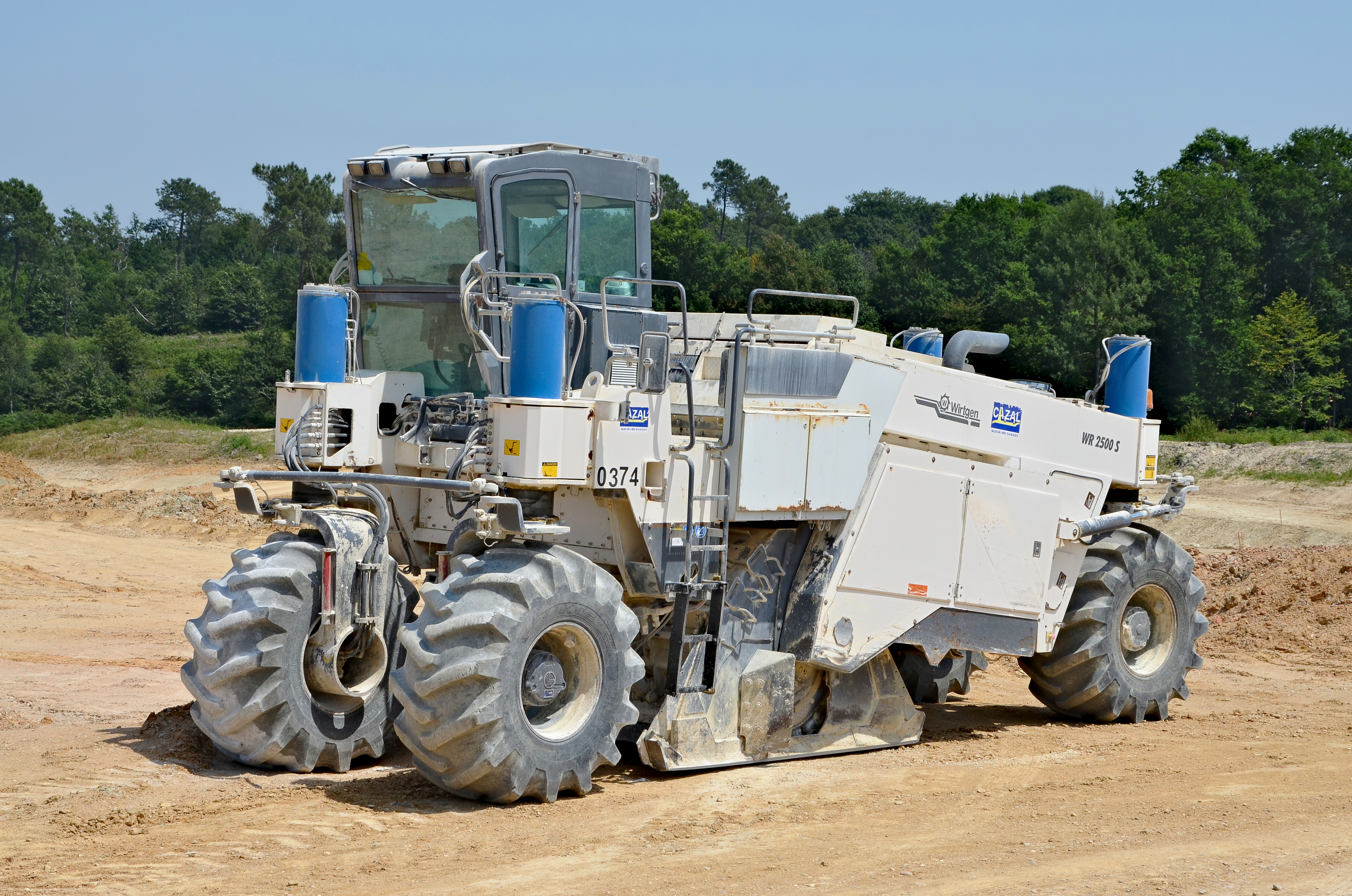
Soil stabilizer Wirtgen WR 2500 S

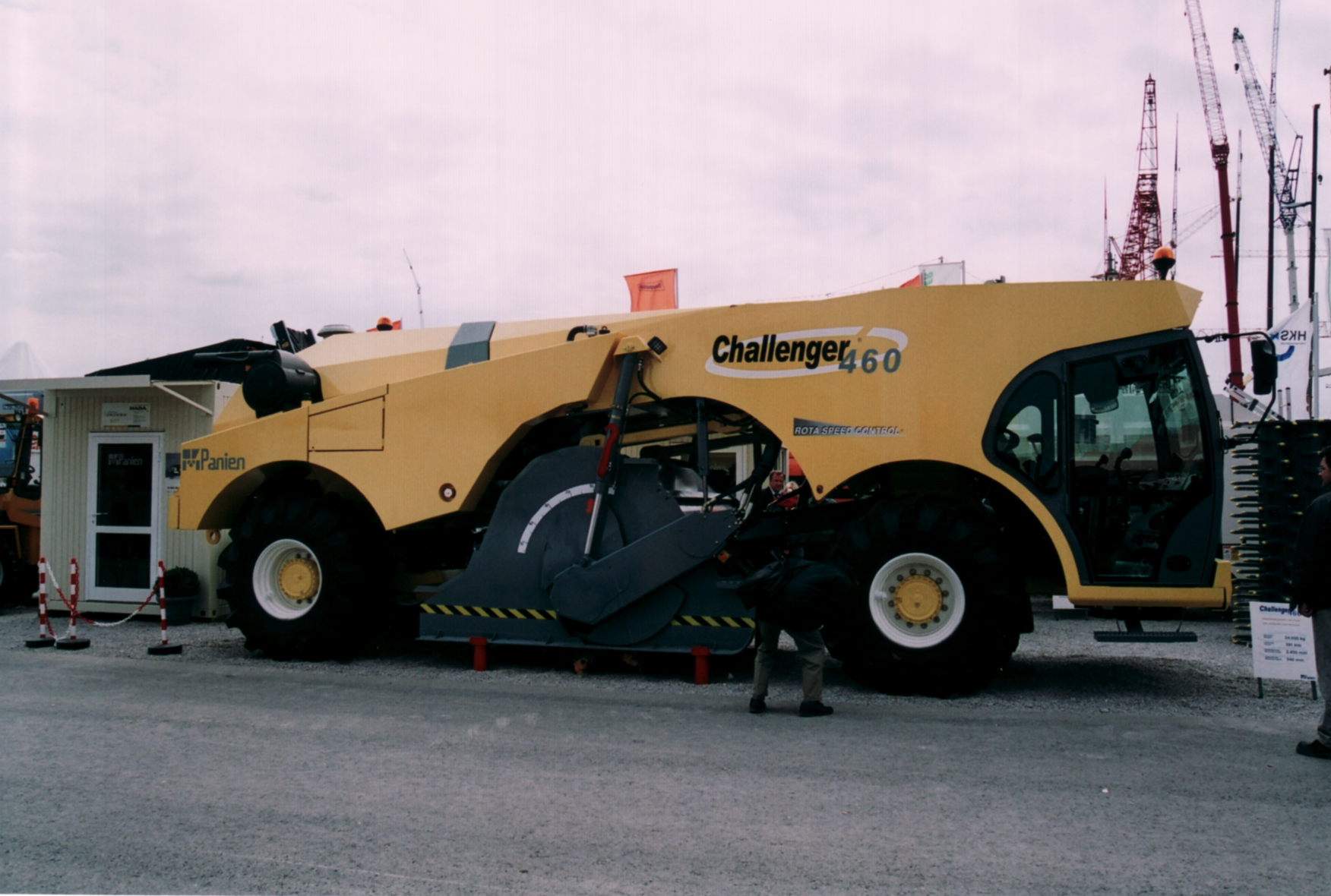
A modern looking soil stabilizer machine

== See also ==
- Cold milling machine
- Soil compaction
