= Arnold Kriegstein =

- Born: Tirschenreuth, Bavaria
- Education: Yale University (BA), New York University (MD, PhD)
- Occupations: Neurologist and Neuroscientist
- Employer(s): Director of the UCSF Eli and Edythe Broad Center of Regeneration Medicine and Stem Cell Research at University of California, San Francisco (2004–2021)

Arnold Richard Kriegstein is a neurologist and neuroscientist at the University of California, San Francisco, where he served as director of the UCSF Eli and Edythe Broad Center of Regeneration Medicine and Stem Cell Research from 2004 to 2021. His main research interests include neural stem cell and brain development. He is a member of the National Academy of Medicine.

== Early life and education ==
Kriegstein received his BA in biology and psychology from Yale University in 1971, and his MD and PhD degrees from New York University in 1977. He completed his doctoral work in physiology in the laboratory of Eric Kandel and residency training in neurology at the Brigham and Women’s Hospital, Children's Hospital, and Beth Israel Hospital in Boston. He is a board-certified neurologist.

== Career ==
Following residency, Kriegstein began his academic career at Stanford University where he worked for ten years, serving as a pediatric and adult neurologist as well as starting his research laboratory. He held appointments at Yale University from 1991 to 1993 before joining the Neurology Department at Columbia University in 1993 where he stayed until 2004. While at Columbia, Kriegstein was named the John and Elizabeth Harris Professor of Neurology and became the founding director of the Neural Stem Cell Program at Columbia University.

Kriegstein joined the University of California, San Francisco, in 2004, where he became the John Bowes Distinguished Professor in Stem Cell and Tissue Biology and founding director of the UCSF Eli and Edythe Broad Center of Regeneration Medicine and Stem Cell Research. In 2011, the $123 million Ray & Dagmar Dolby Regeneration Medicine Building was opened, which is home to the Eli and Edythe Broad Center of Regeneration Medicine at University of California, San Francisco. The building houses one of the largest stem cell programs in the United States with over 70 laboratories.

== Research ==
Kriegstein is known for research focusing on the way in which neural stem cells and progenitor cells produce neurons in the embryonic brain, and how this information can be used for cell-based therapies to treat diseases of the nervous system. His lab found that radial glial cells, long thought to simply guide nerve cells during migration, are neuronal stem cells in the developing brain. This concept, unexpected at the time, is now one of the tenets of developmental neuroscience. Kriegstein also described a class of intermediate precursor cells produced by radial glia, suggesting a new mechanism for the generation of cell diversity.

More recent research has focused on the developing human brain. Kriegstein discovered that the outer subventricular zone, a progenitor region in the developing human brain, contains a novel neural stem cell type he termed the outer radial glial (oRG). He found that oRG cells generate transit amplifying daughter cells, thus producing further complex neuronal lineages. Over the past several years, Kriegstein has applied strategies for massively parallel profiling molecular and physiological properties of primary human cortical cells using microfluidic technologies, cellular barcoding, and timelapse microscopy to identify additional progenitor cell types. His research has also addressed brain evolution and neurodevelopmental disorders such as autism.

== Honors ==
Solomon A. Berson Medical Alumni Achievement, 2011

Javits Neuroscience Investigator Award, 1999 and 2011

NINDS Outstanding Investigator Award, 2017
