= El Deber =

Bolivian newspaper

- Un diario para pueblos que no pueden vivir sin luz
- Type: Daily newspaper
- Format: Tabloid
- Owner(s): Empresa de Comunicacion Social El Deber S.A.
- Founder(s): Lucas Saucedo Sevilla
- Founded: 1953
- Language: Spanish
- Headquarters: Av. El Trompillo 1144, 2do. Anillo Santa Cruz de la Sierra, Bolivia
- Country: Bolivia
- Website: www.eldeber.com.bo

El Deber (Literally in English: "Duty") is a newspaper published in Santa Cruz de la Sierra, Bolivia.
