= Tegeta Holding =

Automotive company in Georgia

Tegeta Holding Georgian: თეგეტა ჰოლდინგი
- Tegeta Holding headquarters in Tbilisi, Georgia.
- Industry: Automotive services
- Founded: 1995; 31 years ago
- Headquarters: Tbilisi, Georgia
- Area served: Georgia, Azerbaijan, Uzbekistan, Armenia, United Arab Emirates
- Key people: Temur Kokhodze (Founder)
- Products: Cars, Construction Equipment, Truck & Bus, Construction Machinery, Academy, Rentals, Leasing
- Revenue: 659,446,000 ₾ (2022)
- Number of employees: Up to 2500
- Website: tegetamotors.ge

Tegeta Holding (Georgian: თეგეტა ჰოლდინგი) is one of the largest automotive companies in the Caucasus and Central Asia region. The Holding consists of approximately 40 subsidiaries and employs over 3000 individuals.

The company maintains representative offices in Azerbaijan, Uzbekistan, Armenia and the United Arab Emirates, as well as ensuring its services are accessible throughout Georgia. Branches of Tegeta are located in Tbilisi, Mtskheta, Telavi, Kutaisi, Gori, Kazbegi, Batumi, Khelvachauri, Poti, Rukhi, Akhaltsikhe and Marneuli.

Tegeta has collaborated with over 300 international brands. In Georgia, the company represents automotive brands such as Bridgestone, Michelin, Pirelli, Continental, Varta, Exide, FIamm, Optima, Shell, Motul, Mobil, Petronas, Fuchs, Hengst, ZF, Sachs, Lemforder, Bosch, Ate, TRW, Bosch, Toptul, and others.

== History ==
Tegeta was founded by Temur Kokhodze, a Georgian businessman. In 1995, he established Ikarus LLC, which became the first official importer of bus spare parts in Georgia. The company rebranded as Avtoexport in 1996, and has been operating as Tegeta Motors since 2001, having become the largest holding company in the market.

In 1998, Tegeta entered into an agreement with Bridgestone, one of the world's tire manufacturers, becoming their official dealer in Georgia. This partnership has since expanded, with Tegeta now representing Bridgestone region-wide.

Since 2006, Tegeta Holding has been the official importer for MAN TRUCK & BUS, the largest German truck and bus brand, in Georgia. In 2006, the first MAN service center was established in the country.

Tegeta became a member of Groupauto International in 2012, and, in 2022, it was awarded the Groupauto Global Award for its achievements. The award was presented to its central branch, the Truck Division. In addition, in 2019, the company received awards from the European Union and World Bank for “Best Annual Report” and “Transparency.”

Tegeta Holding is a member of several associations, among them: UN Global Compact Network in Georgia; BAG - NNLE Business Association of Georgia; AMCHAM - NNLE American Chamber of Commerce in Georgia; EBA - European Business Association.

== Segments of the business ==
Tegeta Motors offers automotive services for light vehicles, trucks, buses, minibuses and special-purpose equipment. The company has a network of 28 branches throughout the country.

Tegeta Cars – A subsidiary of Tegeta Holding, Tegeta Cars represents such brands as Porsche, Mazda, Toyota, Volvo, Europcar, Auto Gallery, and Indian. In 2023, it expanded its portfolio to include the Chinese automotive giants Geely and Zeekr. In 2024, Tegeta Cars became the official representative in Georgia for two luxury car brands: Bentley and Lamborghini.

Tegeta Construction Equipment – a subsidiary of Tegeta Holding, has been operating in the market since 2007, being an official importer for JCB, the leading British brand of construction equipment, for Georgia and the Transcaucasia region.

Tegeta Truck & Bus – a subsidiary of Tegeta Holding, has been operating in the Georgian market since 2006. The company is the official importer of the German brand MAN TRUCK & BUS, for Georgia and the Transcaucasia region.

Construction Machinery Georgia – a subsidiary of Tegeta Holding, represents brands in the field of road construction. The company provides the public and private sectors in the region with equipment for infrastructure and mining projects, including German Liebherr and French brands belonging to the Fayat Group, such as BOMAG and MARINI.

Tegeta Academy – owned by Tegeta Holding, is a college that engages in educational and consulting activities in technical and business fields.

Tegeta Rentals – a subsidiary of Tegeta Holding, was established in 2019. The company offers construction and special-purpose equipment for rent.

Tegeta Leasing – a subsidiary of Tegeta Holding, was established in 2023. The company provides special terms and conditions for Tegeta customers, aiming to streamline processes and enhance experiences.
