= Road roller =

Compactor type engineering vehicle

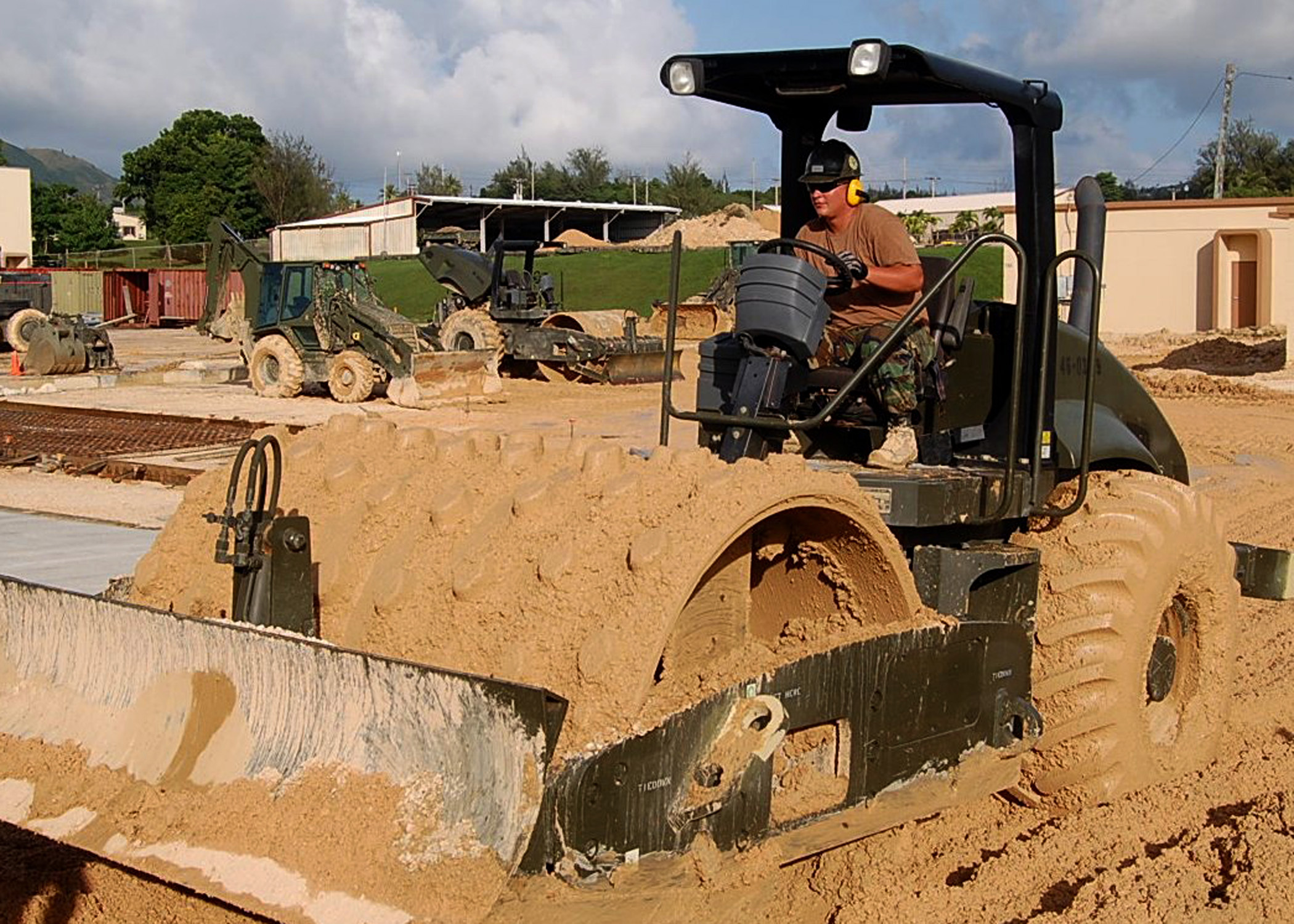
Caterpillar soil compactor equipped with padfoot drum, being used to compact the ground before placing concrete

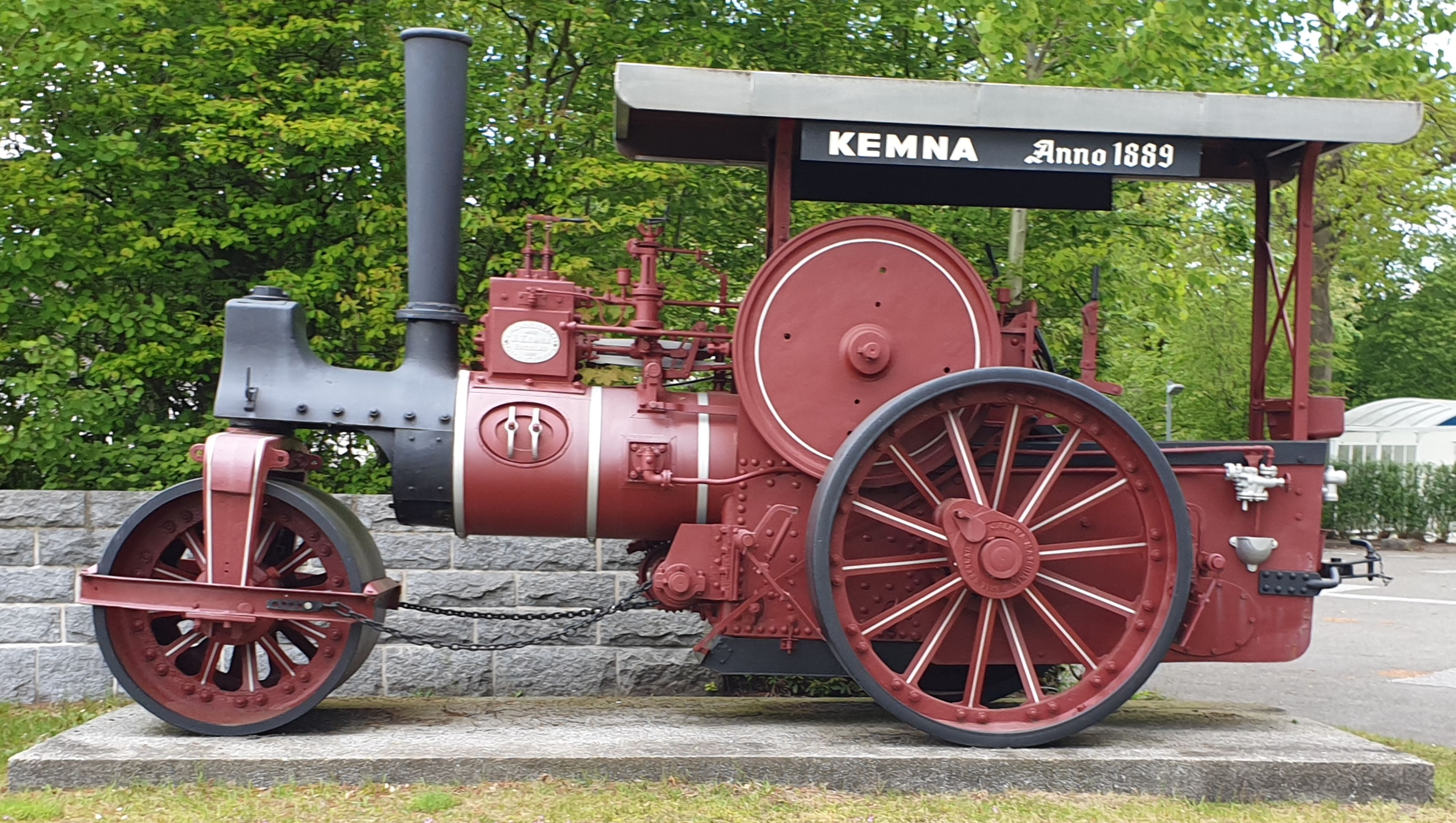
Antique "Kemna" steamroller

A road roller (sometimes called a roller-compactor, or just roller) is a compactor-type engineering vehicle used to compact soil, gravel, concrete, or asphalt in the construction of roads and foundations. Similar rollers are used also at landfills or in agriculture.

Road rollers are frequently referred to as steamrollers, regardless of their method of propulsion.

== History ==
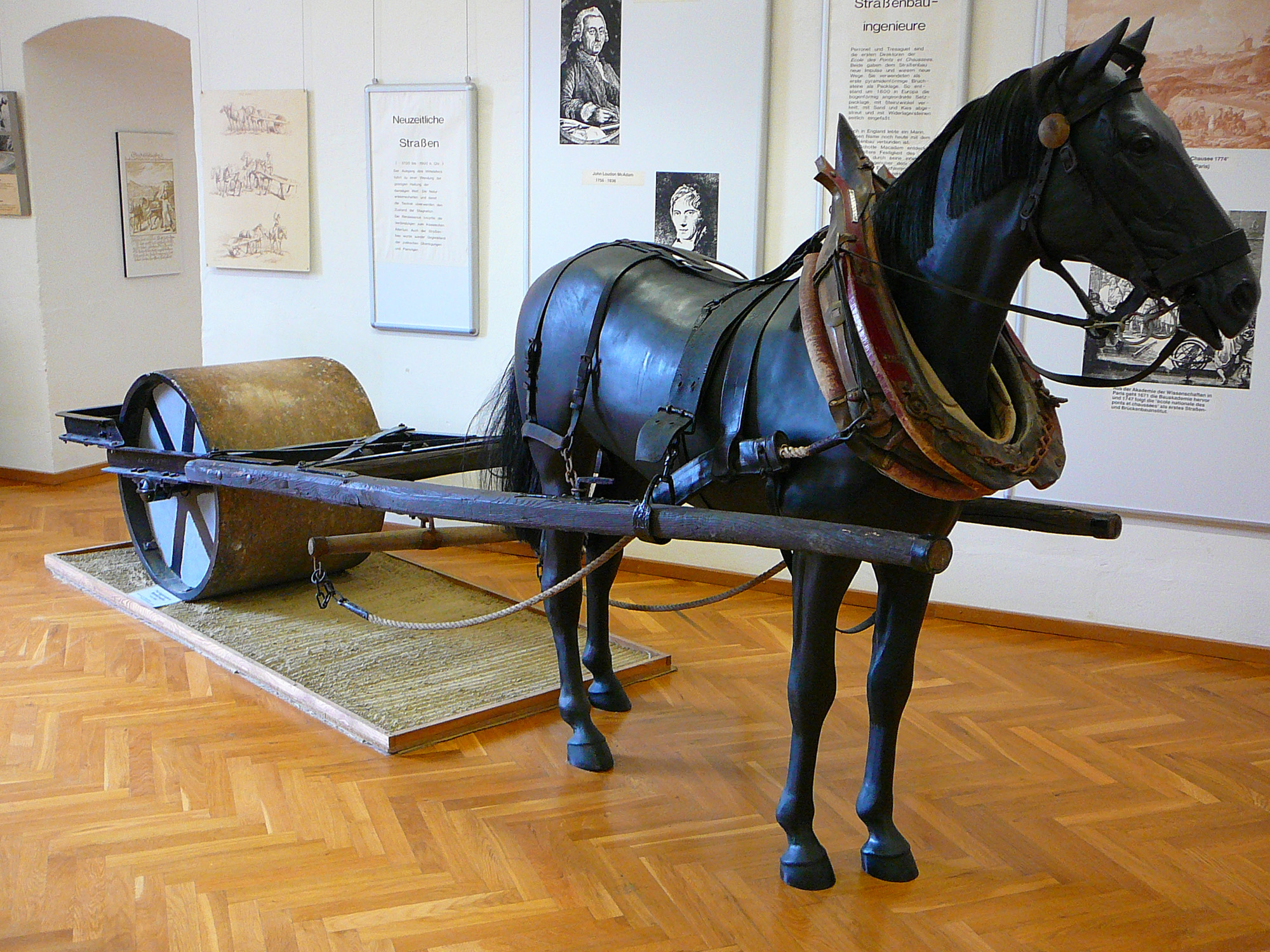
Horse-drawn road roller from 1800

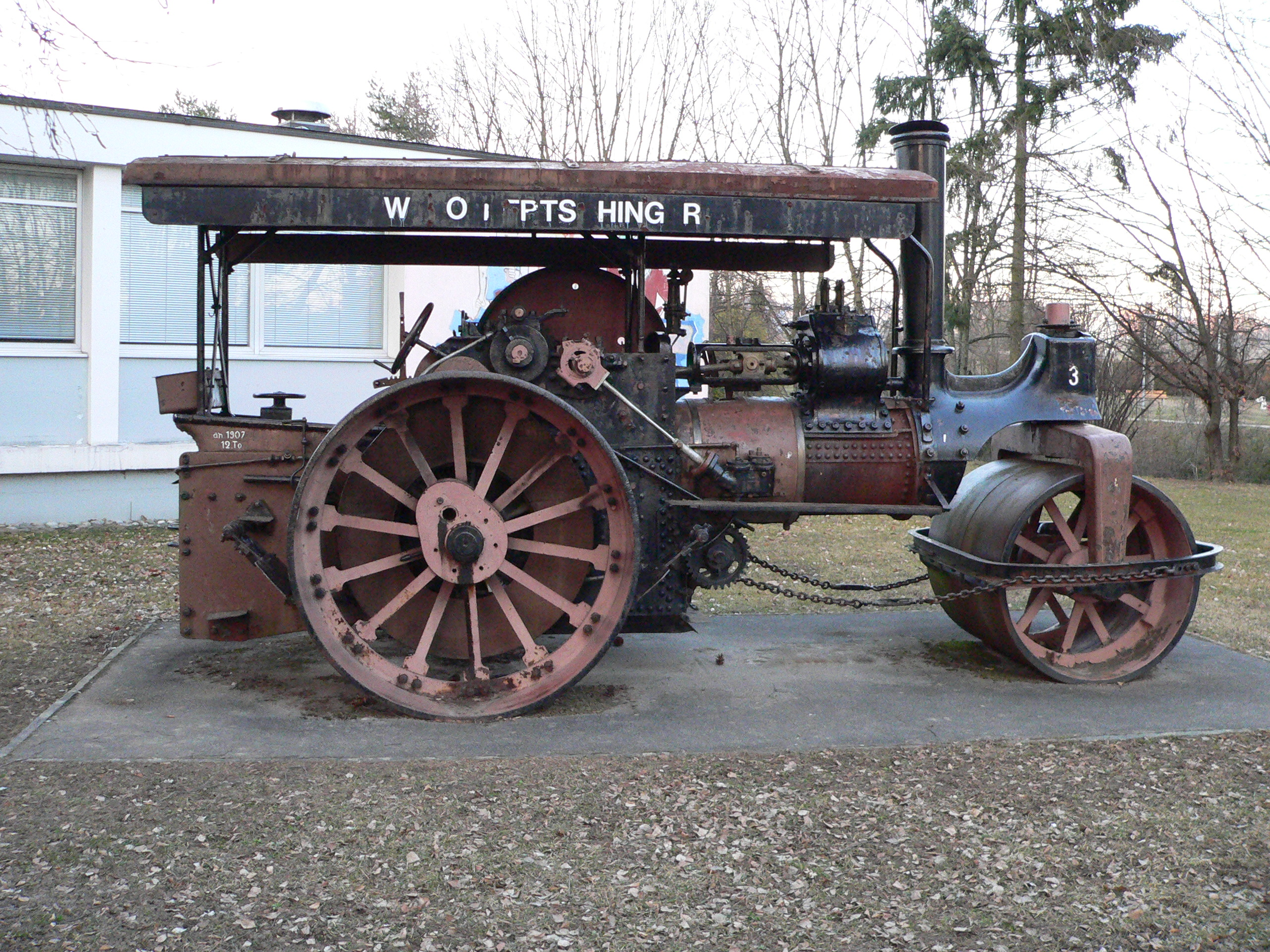
Steam-powered roller

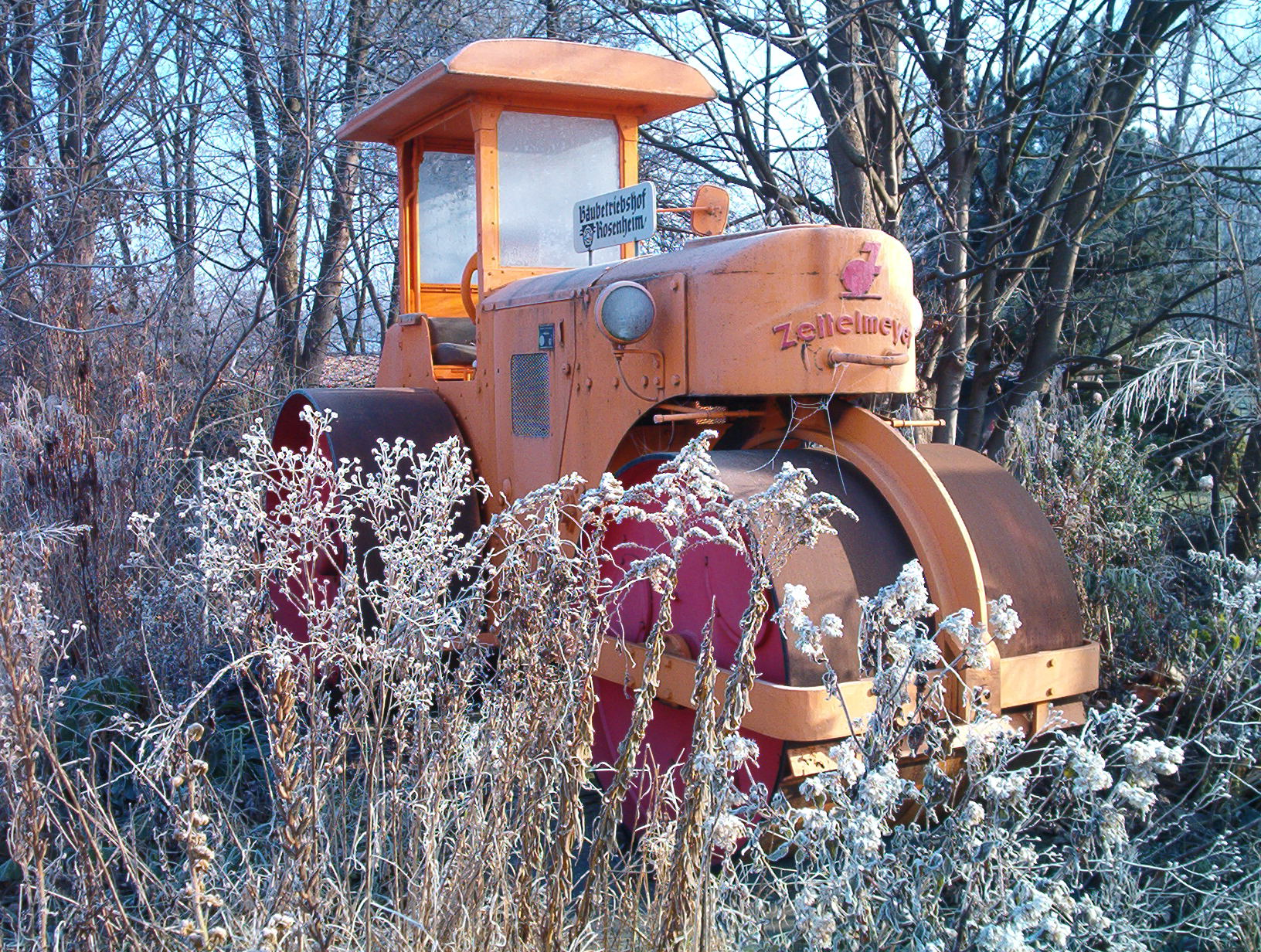
Zettelmeyer diesel-powered road roller

The first road rollers were horse-drawn, and were probably borrowed farm implements (see Roller).

Since the effectiveness of a roller depends to a large extent on its weight, self-powered vehicles replaced horse-drawn rollers from the mid-19th century. The first such vehicles were steamrollers. Single-cylinder steamrollers were generally used for base compaction and run with high engine revs with low gearing to promote bounce and vibration from the crankshaft through to the rolls in much the same way as a vibrating roller. The double-cylinder or compound steam rollers became popular from around 1910 onwards and were used mainly for the rolling of hot-laid surfaces due to their smoother-running engines, but both cylinder types are capable of rolling the finished surface. Steamrollers were often dedicated to a task by their gearing as the slower engines were for base compaction whereas the higher-geared models were often referred to as "chip chasers" which followed the hot tar- and chip-laying machines. Some road companies in the US used steamrollers through the 1950s. In the UK some remained in service until the early 1970s.

As internal combustion engines improved during the 20th century, kerosene-, gasoline- (petrol), and diesel-powered rollers gradually replaced their steam-powered counterparts. The first internal-combustion-powered road rollers were similar to the steam rollers they replaced. They used similar mechanisms to transmit power from the engine to the wheels, typically large, exposed spur gears. Some users disliked them in their infancy, as the engines of the era were typically difficult to start, particularly the kerosene-powered ones.

Virtually all road rollers in use today use diesel power.

== Uses on a road ==
Road rollers use the weight of the vehicle to compress the surface being rolled (static) or use mechanical advantage (vibrating). Initial compaction of the substrate on a road project is done using a padfoot or "sheep's foot" drum roller, which achieves higher compaction density due to the pads having less surface area. On large freeways, a four-wheel compactor with padfoot drum and a blade, such as a Caterpillar 815/825 series machine, would be used due to its high weight, speed, and the powerful pushing force to spread bulk material. On regional roads, a smaller single padfoot drum machine may be used.

The next machine is usually a single smooth drum compactor that compacts the high spots down until the soil is smooth. This is usually done in combination with a motor grader to obtain a level surface. Sometimes at this stage a pneumatic tyre roller is used. These rollers feature two rows (front and back) of pneumatic tyres that overlap, and the flexibility of the tyres provides a kneading action that seals the surface and with some vertical movement of the wheels, enables the roller to operate effectively on uneven ground. Once the soil base is flat the pad drum compactor is no longer used on the road surface.

The next course (road base) is compacted using a smooth single drum, smooth tandem roller, or pneumatic tyre roller in combination with a grader and a water truck to achieve the desired flat surface with the correct moisture content for optimum compaction. Once the road base is compacted, the smooth single drum compactor is no longer used on the road surface (there is an exception if the single drum has special flat-wide-base tyres on the machine).

The final wear course of asphalt concrete (known as asphalt or blacktop in North America, or tarmac in the United Kingdom) is laid using a paver and compacted using a tandem smooth drum roller, a three-point roller or a pneumatic tyre roller. Three-point rollers on asphalt were once common and are still used, but tandem vibrating rollers are the usual choice now. The pneumatic tyre roller's kneading action is the final roller to seal the surface.

Rollers are also used in landfill compaction. Such compactors typically have padfoot drums, and do not achieve a smooth surface. The pads aid in compression, due to the smaller area contacting the ground.

== Configurations ==
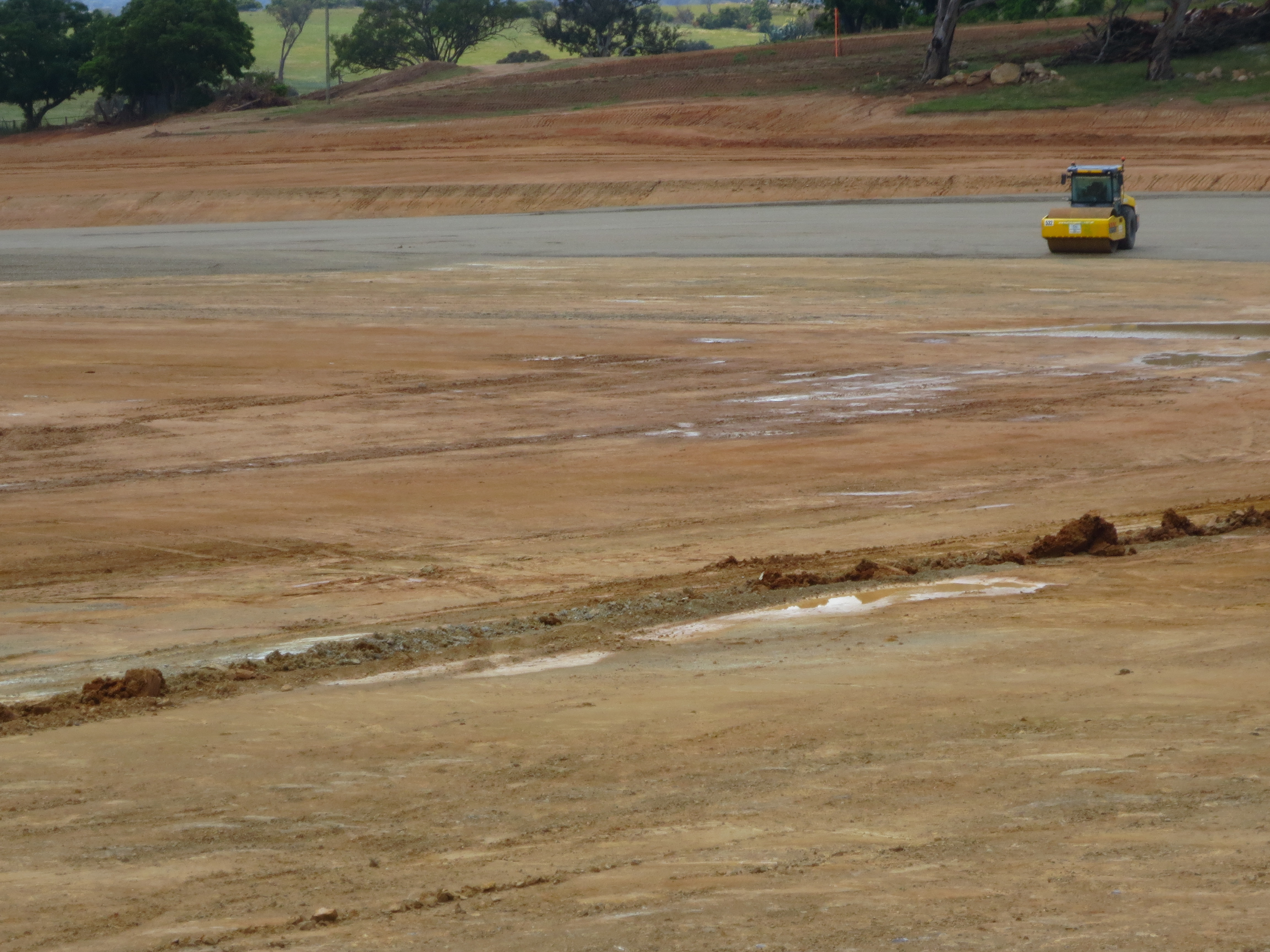
Flattened and leveled construction site with road roller in the background

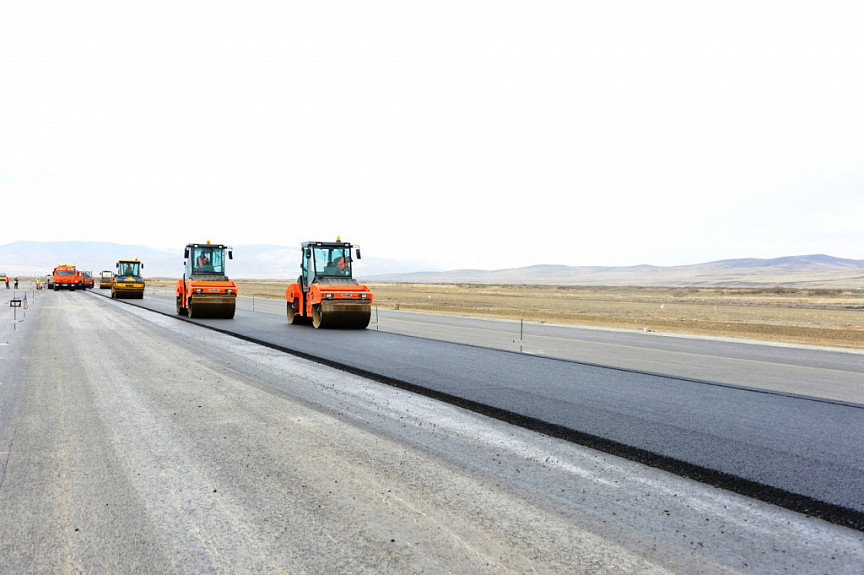
Rollers compact the asphalt layer. Buryatia, Russia

The roller can be a simple drum with a handle that is operated by one person and weighs 45 kilograms (100 lb) or as large as a ride-on road roller weighing 20 tonnes (20 long tons; 22 short tons) and costing more than US$150,000. A landfill unit may weigh 54 tonnes (53 long tons; 60 short tons).

=== Roller types ===
==== Pedestrian-operated ====
- Rammer (bounce up and down)
- Walk-behind plate compactor/light
- Trench roller (manual unit or radio-frequency remote control)
- Walk-behind roller/light (single drum)
- Walk-behind roller/heavy (double drum)

==== Ride-on smooth finish ====
- Tandem drum (static)
- Tandem drum (vibrating)
- Single drum roller (smooth)
- Pneumatic-tyred Roller, called rubber tyre or multi-wheel
- Combination roller (single row of tyres and a steel drum)
- Three point roller (steam rollers are usually three-point)

==== Ride-on soil/landfill compactor with pads/feet/spikes ====
- Single drum roller (soil)
- 4-wheel (soil/landfill)
- 3-point (soil/landfill)
- Tandem drum (soil/landfill)

==== Other ====
- Tractor-mounted and tractor-powered (conversion – see gallery picture below)
- Drawn rollers or towed rollers (once common, now rare)
- Impact compactor (uses a square or polygon drum to strike the ground hard for proof rolling or deep lift compacting)
- Drum roller with rubber coated drum for asphalt compaction
- Log skidder converted to compactor for landfill
- Wheel loader converted to compactor for landfill

=== Drum types ===
Drums are available in widths ranging from 610 to 2,130 millimetres (24 to 84 in).

=== Tyre roller types ===
Tyre rollers are available in widths ranging up to 2.7 metres (8.9 ft), with between 7 and 11 wheels (e.g. 3 wheels at front, 4 at back): 7 and 8 wheel types are normally used in Europe and Africa; 9 and 11 in America; and any type in Asia. Very heavy tyre rollers are used to compact soil.

=== Variations and features ===
- On some machines, the drums may be filled with water on site to achieve the desired weight. When empty, the lighter machine is easier and cheaper to transport between work sites. On pneumatic tyre rollers the body may be ballasted with water or sand, or for extra compaction wet sand is used. Modern tyre rollers may be filled with steel ballast, which gives a more even balance for better compaction.
- Additional compaction may be achieved by vibrating the roller drums, allowing a small, light machine to perform as well as a much heavier one. Vibration is typically produced by a free-spinning hydrostatic motor inside the drum to whose shaft an eccentric weight has been attached. Some rollers have a second weight that can be rotated relative to the main weight, to adjust the vibration amplitude and thus the compacting force.
- Water lubrication may be provided to the drum surface from on-board "sprinkler tanks" to prevent hot asphalt sticking to the drum.
- Hydraulic transmissions permit greater design flexibility. While early examples used direct mechanical drives, hydraulics reduce the number of moving parts exposed to contamination and allows the drum to be driven, providing extra traction on inclines.
- Human-propelled rollers may only have a single roller drum.
- Self-propelled rollers may have two drums, mounted one in front of the other (format known as "duplex"), or three rolls, or just one, with the back rollers replaced with treaded pneumatic tyres for increased traction.

== Gallery ==
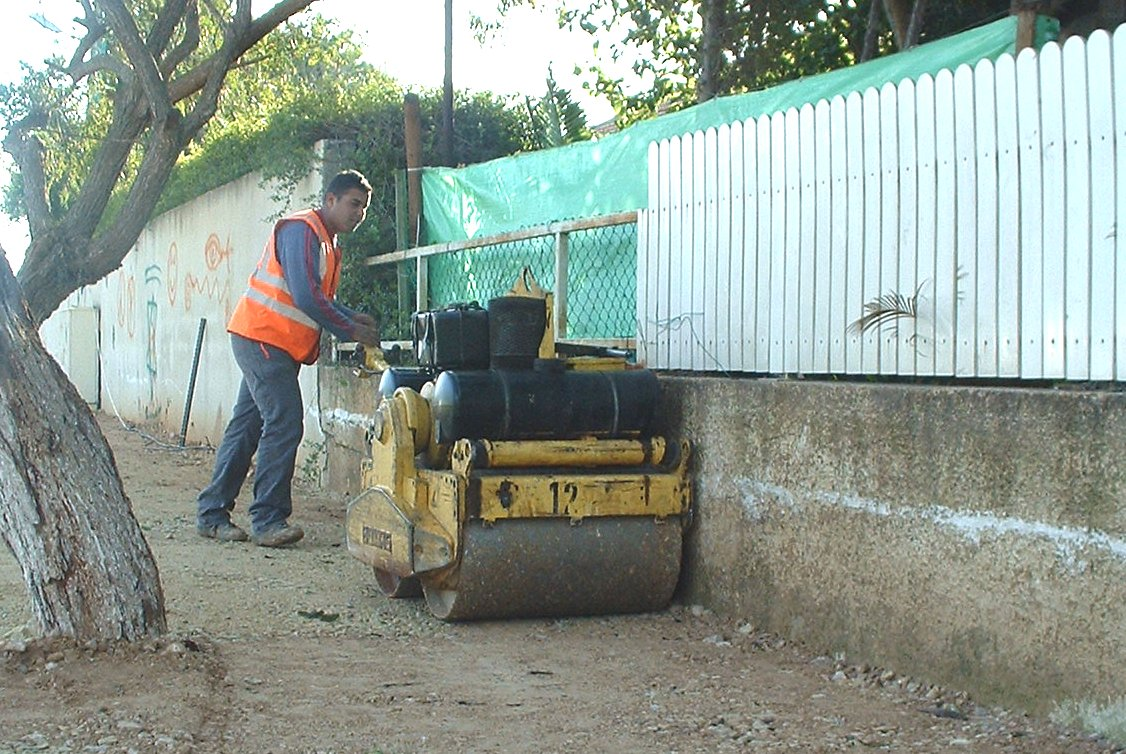
Powered, vibrating walk-behind

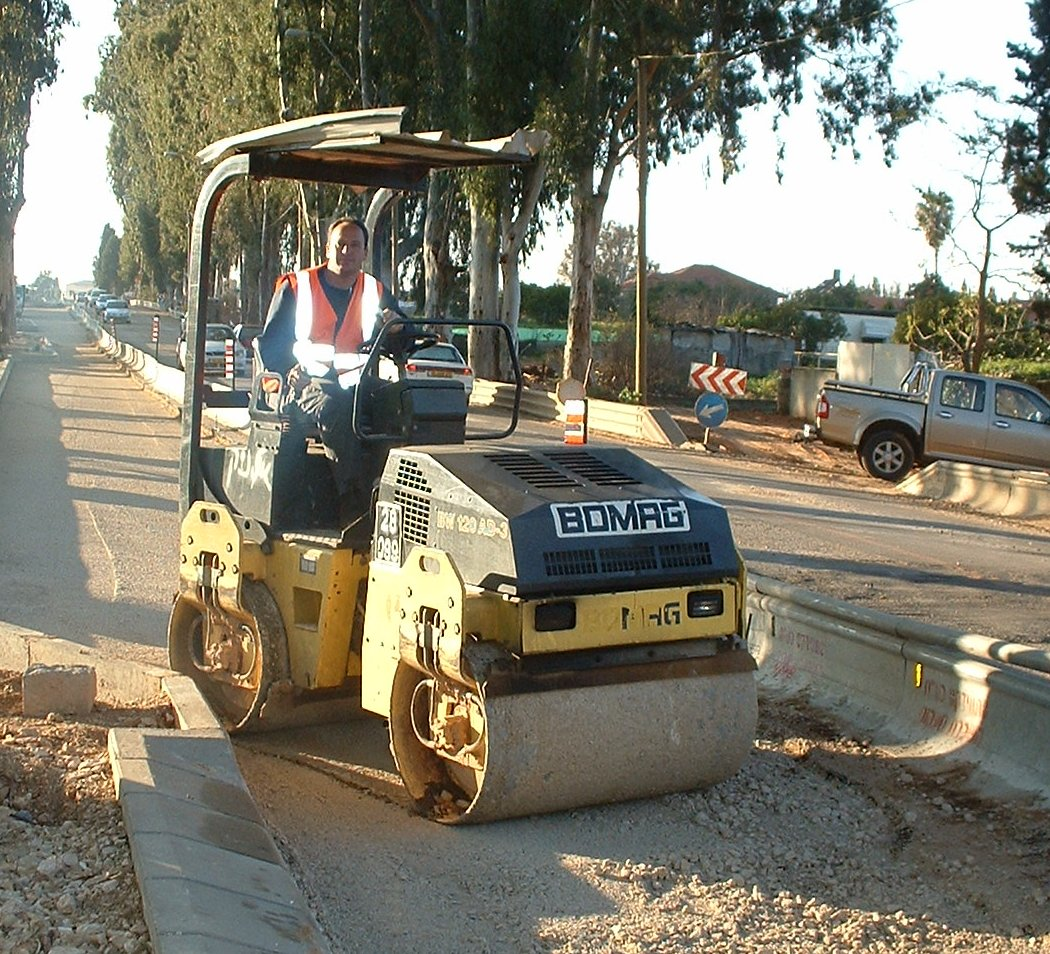
Ride-on with articulating-swivel (small machine)

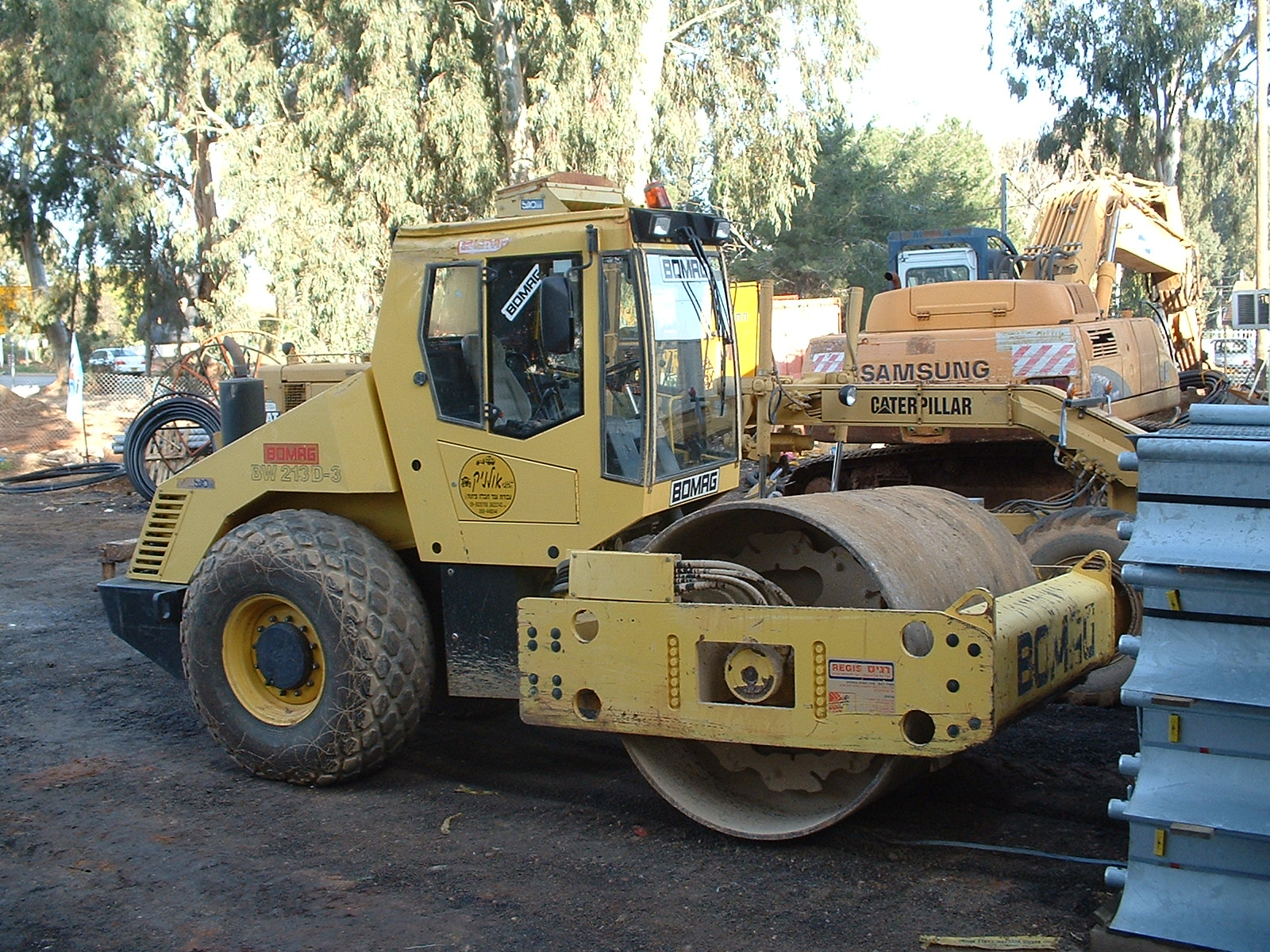
Ride-on with articulating-swivel (large machine)

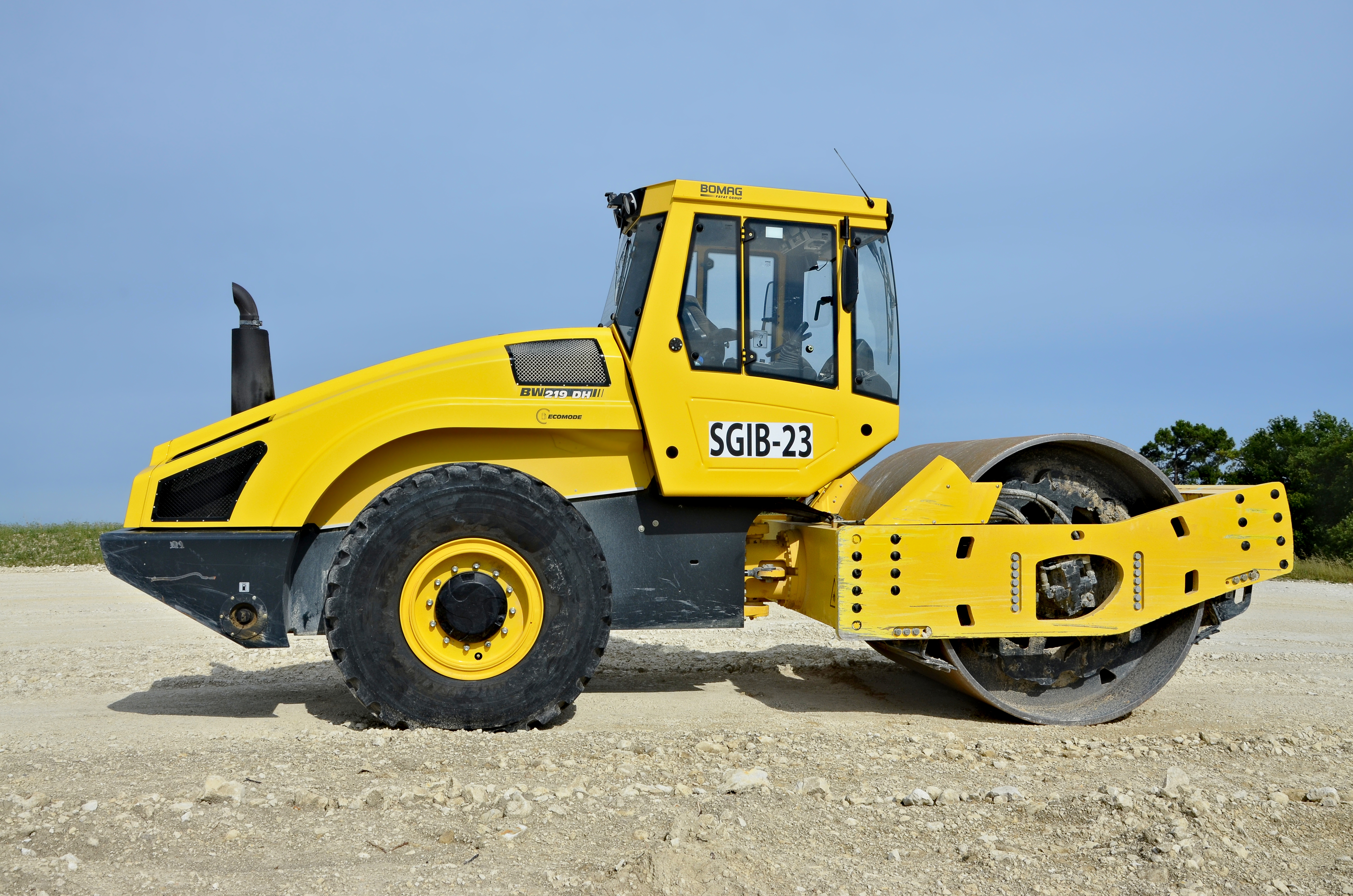
Ride-on with articulating-swivel, Bomag BW 219 DH WR 2500

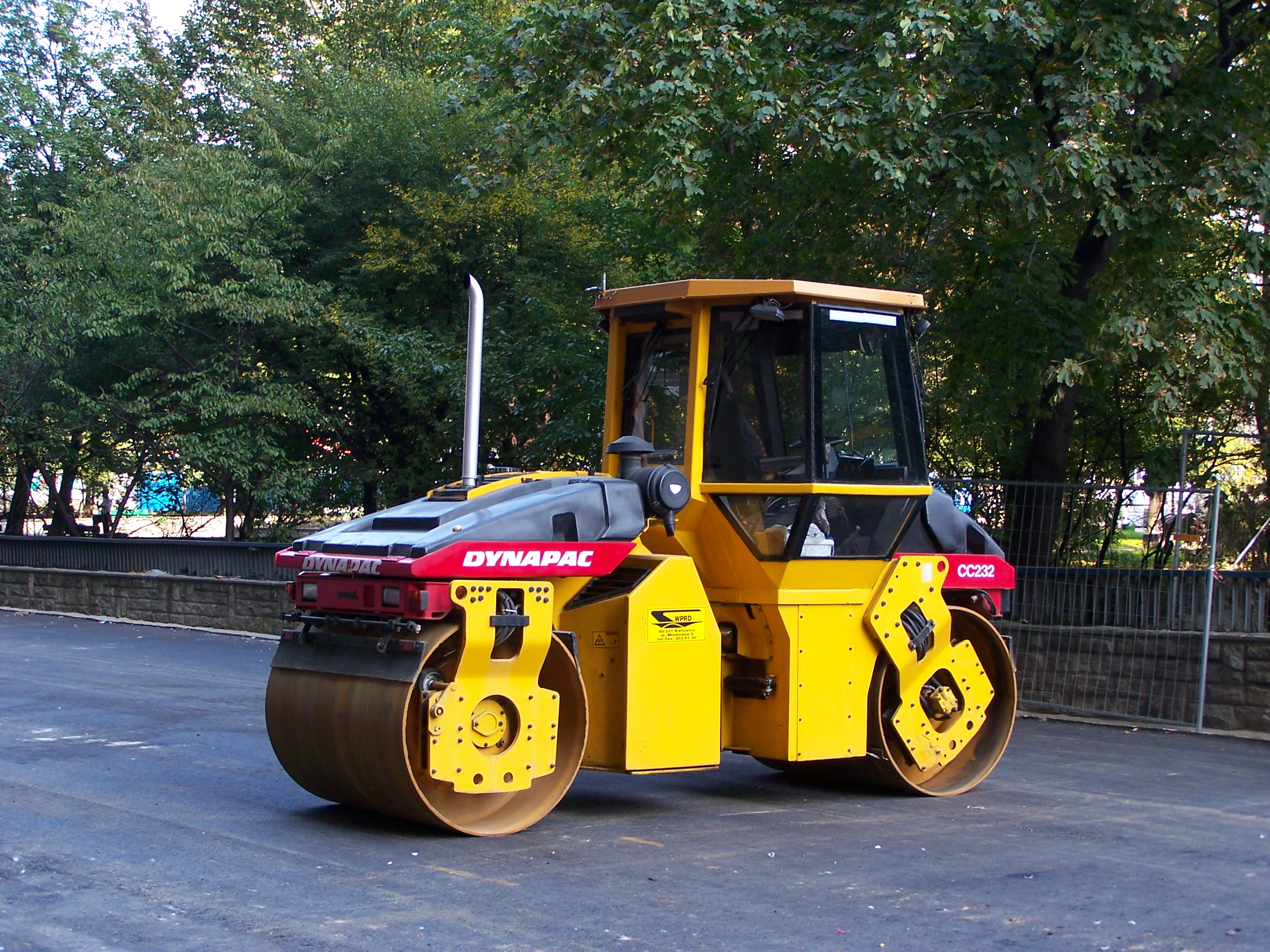
Vibrating Dynapac CC232

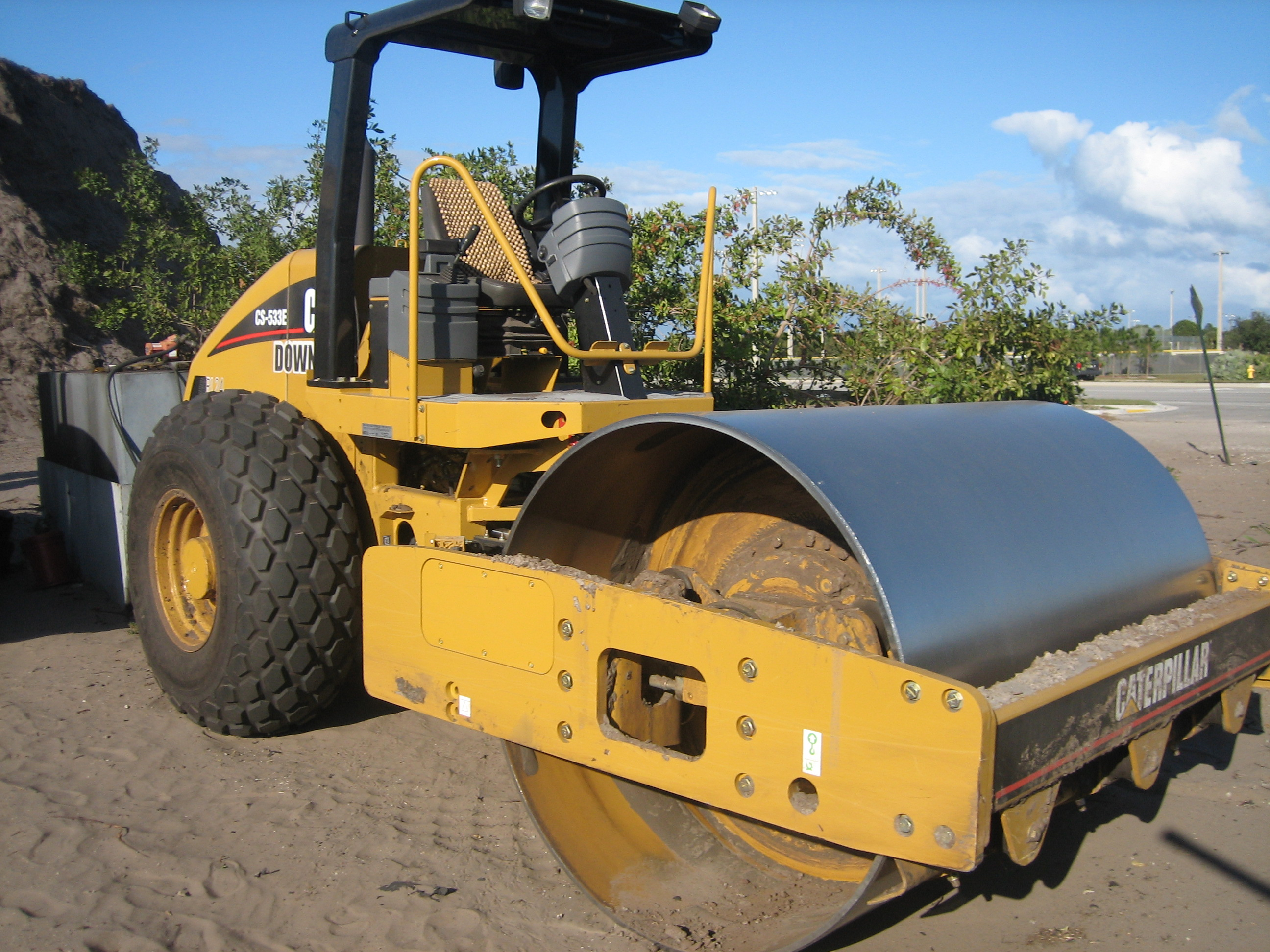
A Caterpillar CS-533E vibratory roller.

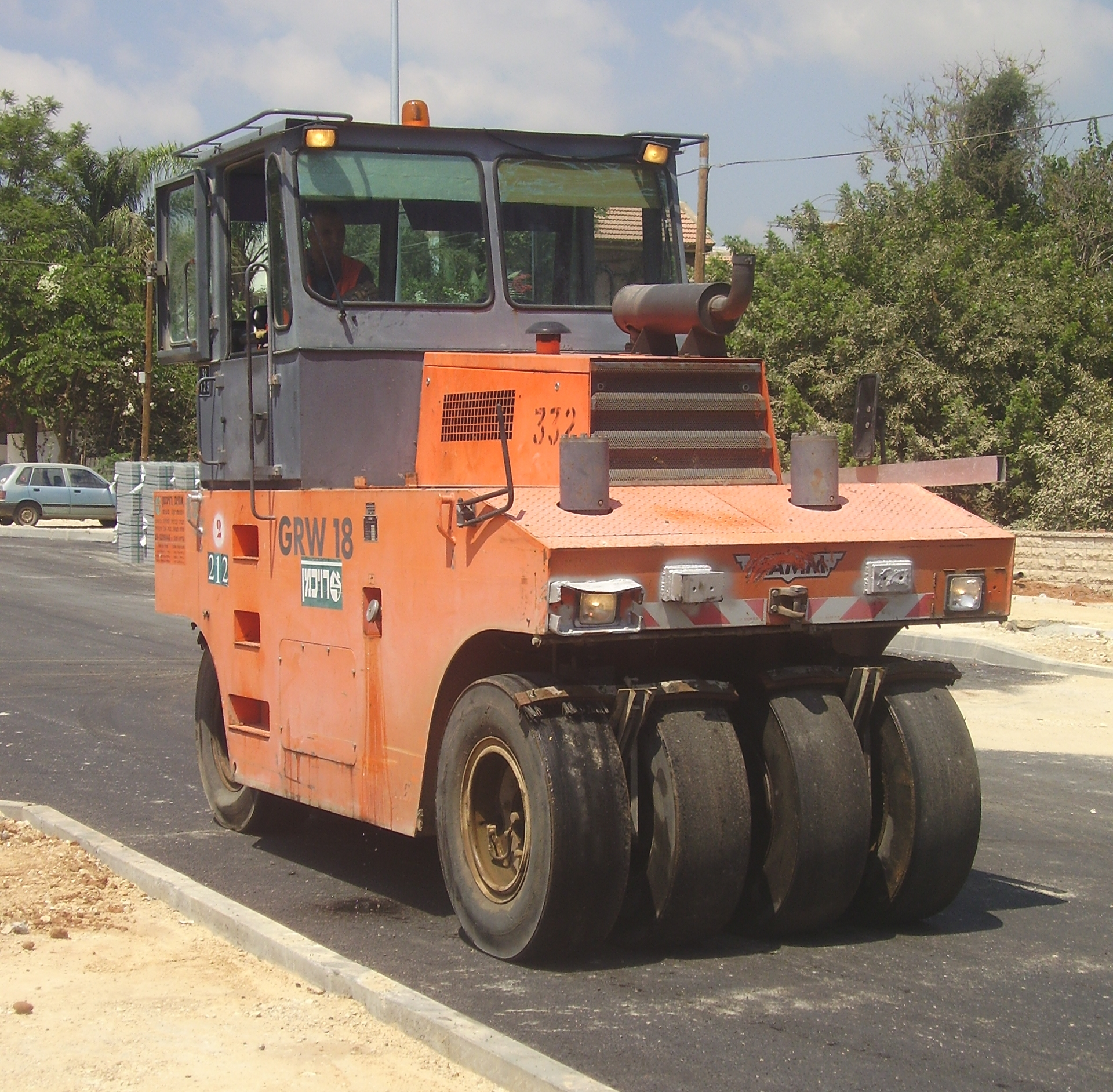
Pneumatic roller

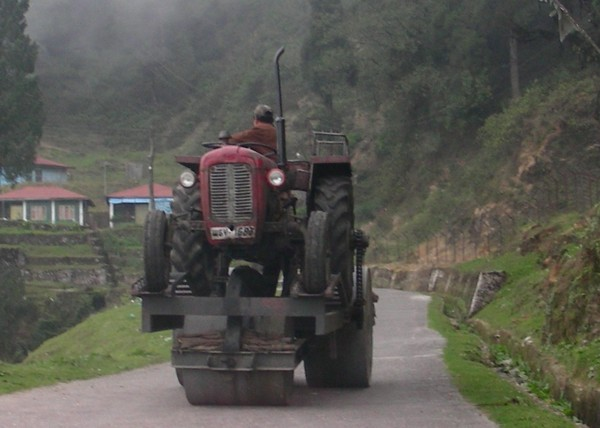
A road-roller powered by a tractor mounted on it

== Manufacturers ==
- ABG (Germany) – SD/TD (purchased by Ingersoll Rand and now part of Volvo)
- Albaret (France) – PT/TD (now part of Caterpillar)
- Ammann Group (Switzerland)
- Aveling-Barford (England) – TD/PT/3P
- BOMAG (Germany) – SD/TD/PT (BOMAG/HYPAC in the US market)
- Case (US) – SD (brands the Ammann/Sta machines as Case in the US)
- Caterpillar (US) – SD/TD/PT (has the former lines of RAYGO, BROS and Bitelli)
- Dynapac (Sweden) – SD/TD/PT/3P
- Galion (US)
- Hamm (Germany) – SD/TD/PT/3P (now part of the Wirtgen Group)
- HEPCO (Iran) – SD/TD/PT/3P
- Hitachi (Japan) – SD/TD/PT/3P
- Huber (US)
- Hyster (US) – SD/TD/PT (part of HYPAC and Bomag USA)
- Ingersoll Rand (US) – SD/TD/PT (now owned by Volvo)
- KEC (India) – tractor-mounted (now part of the RPG Group; production ended c. 1970–1980)
- LiuGong (China)
- Marshall (England) – TD
- Sakai (Japan) – SD/TD/PT/3P
- Sany (China) – SD/TD/PT
- World Equipment (China) – SD/TD/PT
- Tampo (US) – SD/TD
- Vibromax (Germany) – SD/TD/PT (purchased by JCB, now branded JCB)
- Wacker Neuson (Germany)

Key:

- SD = Single drum
- TD = Tandem drum
- PT = Pneumatic tyre – rubber tyre or multi-tyre are also common
- 3P = 3-point rollers – these are very similar to the old steam roller design

== See also ==
- Tractor
- Roller (agricultural tool) – for farm rollers
- Roller (disambiguation) – for other types of roller
- Landfill compaction vehicle
- Mine roller – a demining device
