= Ammann Group =

Swiss mechanical engineering company

Ammann Group Holding AG
- Type: Public
- Industry: construction equipment (engineering vehicles, concrete mixers)
- Founded: 1869
- Founder: Jakob Ammann
- Headquarters: Langenthal, Switzerland
- Key people: Hans-Christian Schneider (CEO); Christoph Lindenmeyer (chairman of the board)
- Revenue: 960 million CHF (2012)
- Number of employees: 3'400 (2012)

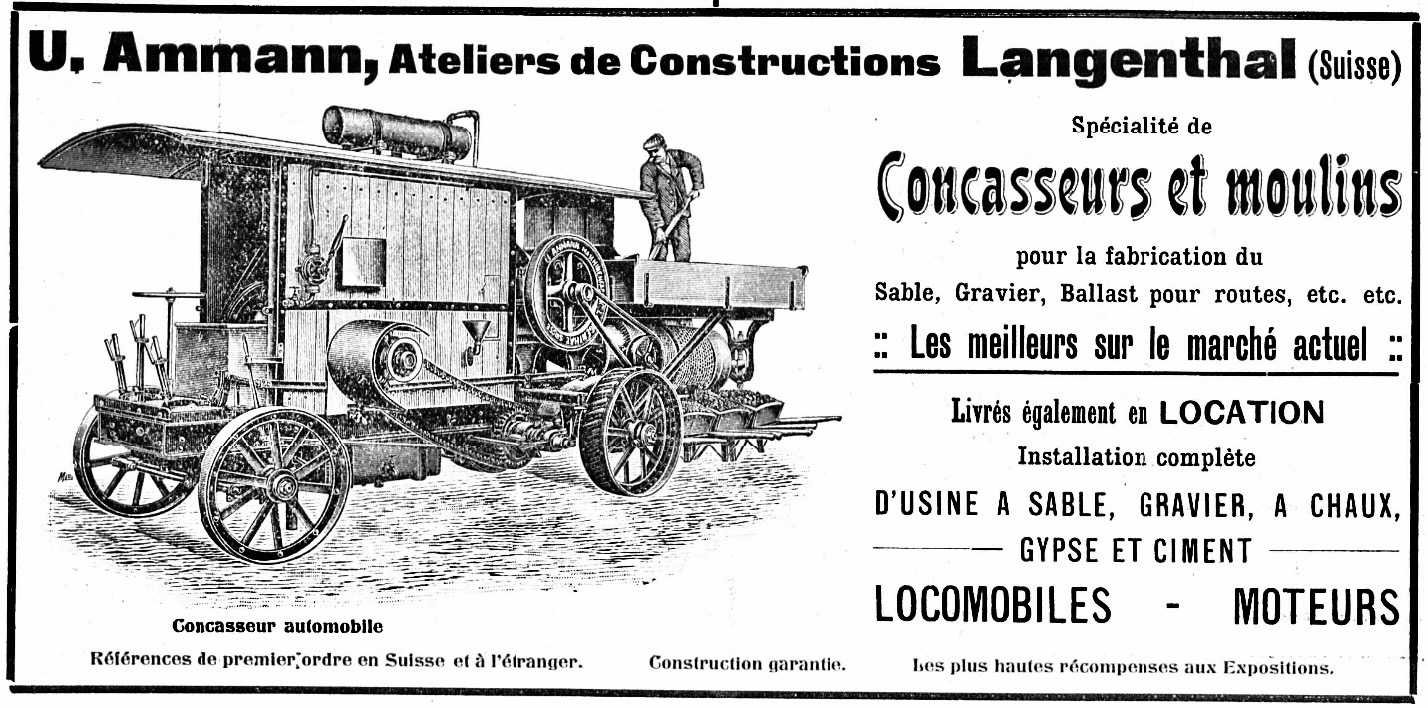
Ammann crusher vehicle (1915)

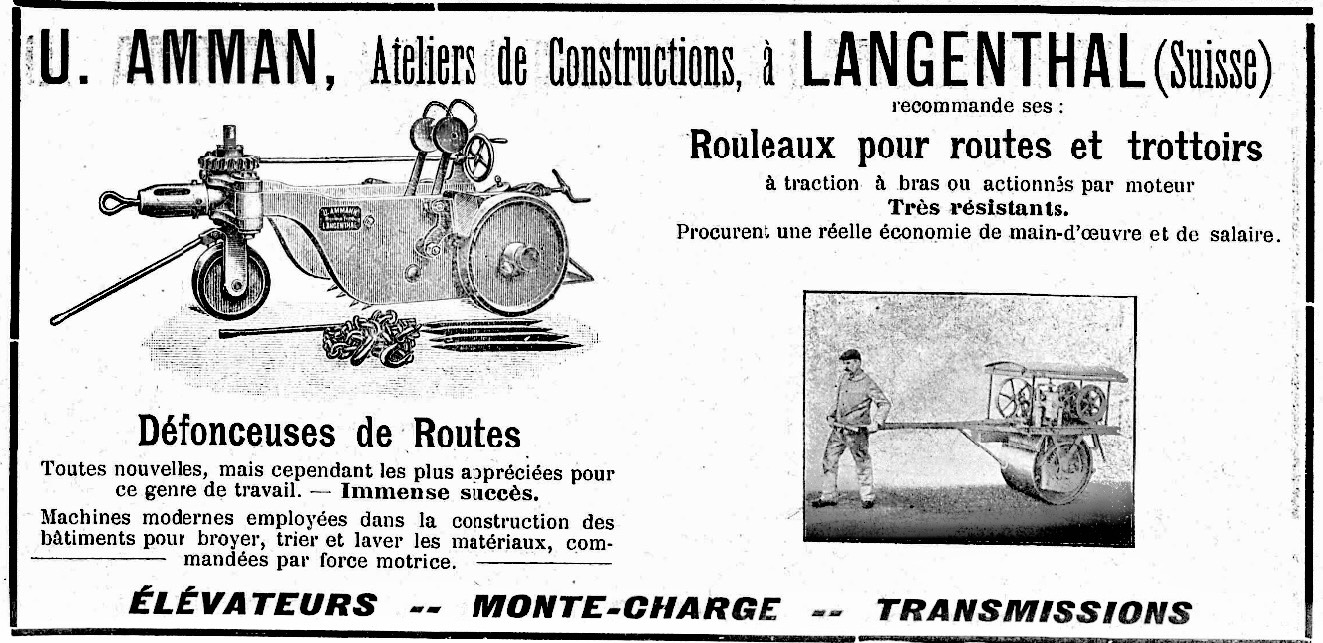
Ammann Road roller (1915)

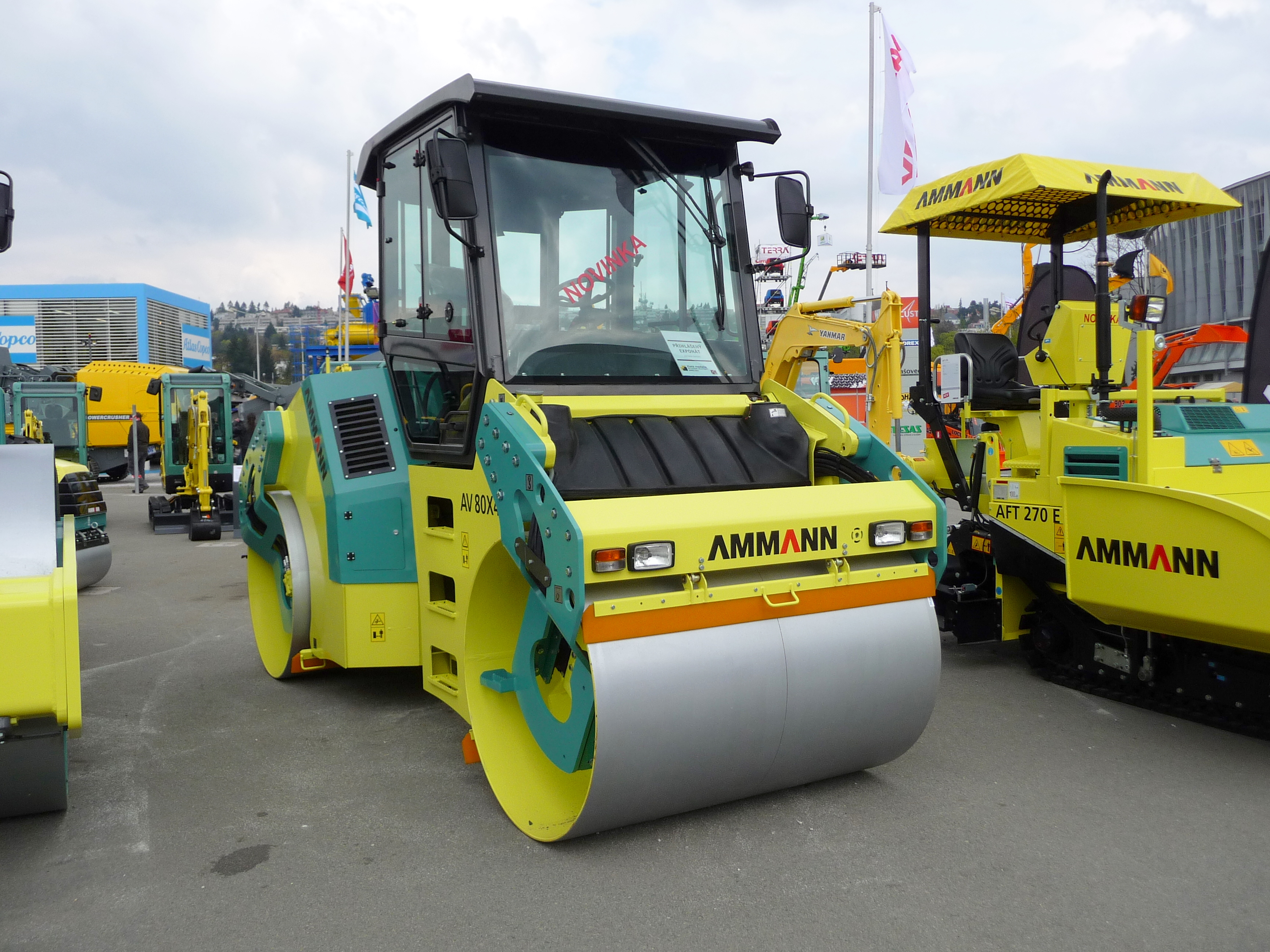
Ammann AV 80X4 double drum roller, on exhibit at the Brno International Building Fair of 2011

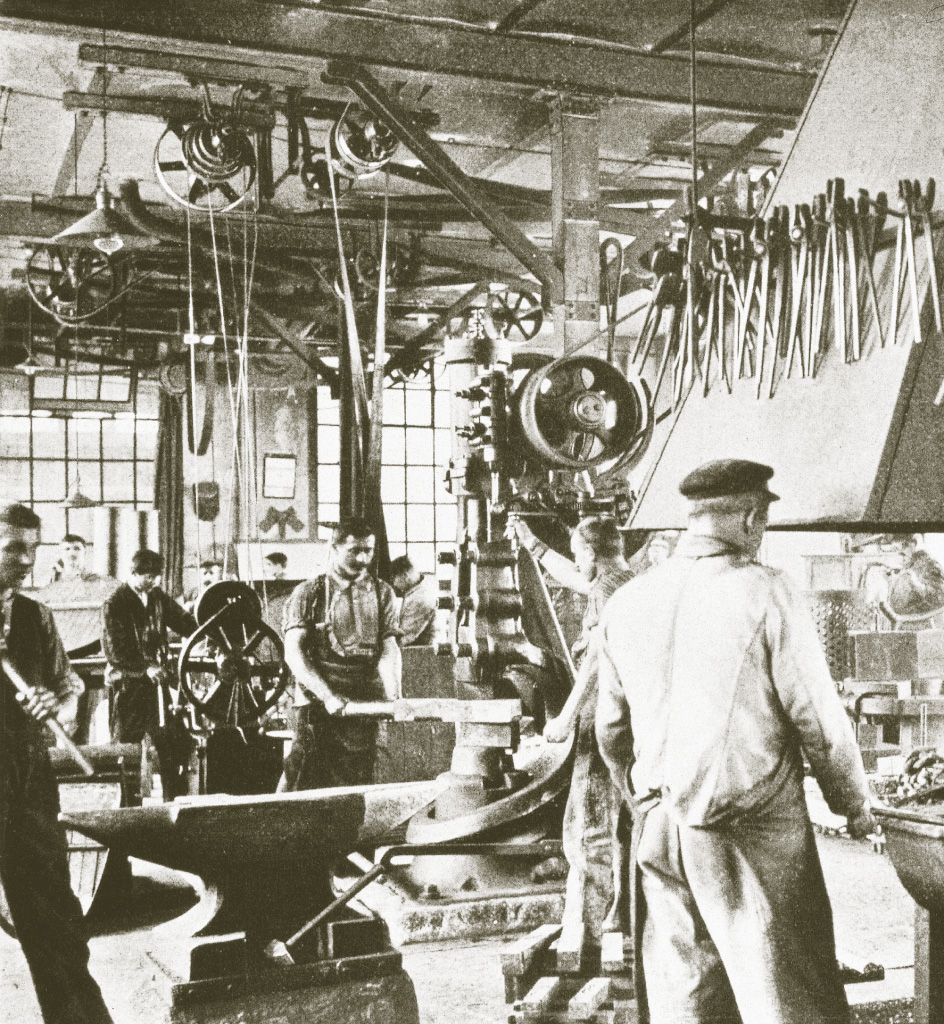
First production facility in Madiswil.

Ammann Group Holding AG (stylized as ΛMMΛNN) is a Swiss mechanical engineering company specialised on machines for the building industry and road construction. The group of companies employs around 3,000 people and generated sales of CHF 900 million in 2020.

As of 2012, the company employs a workforce of about 3,400. It is incorporated in Bern, but its offices are located in Langenthal (canton of Bern).

The company is a family business founded in 1869 by Jakob Ammann. Ammann developed an internal-combustion powered Road roller in 1911. From 1931, the company also acted as representative of Caterpillar Inc. in Switzerland. In the 1980s, Ammann Group expanded to Germany and France (joint-venture with Yanmar 1989), and currently has production facilities in eight locations, Langenthal in Switzerland, Alfeld (Leine) and Hennef in Germany, Verona in Italy, Nové Město nad Metují in the Czech Republic, Shanghai in China, Gravatai in Brazil and Ahmedabad in India.

From 1990 until his election to the Swiss Federal Council in 2010, the company chairman was Johann Schneider-Ammann.

Since the appointment as CEO of Hans-Christian Schneider, the son of Johann Schneider-Ammann, the company has been administered in the owner family's sixth generation.

In April 2013, Ammann announced a joint venture with India based Apollo for the local manufacture of road construction equipment. On 19 June 2020 the group took full control of Ammann India Pvt..

In February 2014 Ammann acquired the German concrete mixing plant manufacturer Elba-Werk Maschinen-Gesellschaft mbH.

In December 2023, Volvo Construction Equipment announced an agreement to divest its ABG paver business to Ammann. The transaction was finalised in June 2024 and included the Hameln facility and paving businesses in Bangalore and Linyi.
