= JCB Vibromax =

JCB Vibromax, formerly known as Vibromax was a manufacturer of road rollers in West Germany. The former Vibromax was acquired by JCB in 2005 and rebranded as JCB Vibromax. In 2012, the Vibromax part of the brand was dropped, and in 2014 the Gatersleben factory was closed with production dispersed to other JCB facilities, marking the end of Vibromax as a distinct business unit.

== History ==
The company originated around mid-1930 in the Losenhausen works, founded by Franz Josef Losenhausen in 1880 and located in Düsseldorf in Germany. The rollers were branded Vibromax for many years until Case Corporation took over Losenhausen in 1972. Case subsequently rebranded the products as CASE Vibromax for the home market and the world market. In 1992 Case sold the product range to Hermann Franz / Frankfurt, the range was again renamed in Vibromax 2000. In 1995 Klaus Antony, Hermann auf der Springe, and Koos Krijger purchased Vibromax 2000, at that time production was moved to the city of Gatersleben, Sachsen Anhalt. Vibromax GmbH, now with the factory in Sachsen Anhalt renamed the compaction range again with the original and historical brand name VIBROMAX. The Vibromax name was then expanded to include a subsidiary Vibromax America Inc. targeting the North America market headquartered in Racine, Wisconsin

The single-drum compactors 602, 1102, 1402 and 1802 were unique in that they had a full-width cab where the operator could sit on either side of the machine to get a good view when working close to obstacles. Most other brands only had a single seat mounted in the centre of the vehicle which limited vision.

In 2005 the Vibromax GmbH Management decided to sell the Vibromax range to JCB. After the completion of sale and merger of all locations and subsidiaries (early 2007). The name of the product range now was changed to JCB Vibromax.

With the introduction of JCB's new logo in 2012, the JCB Vibromax brand was phased out in favour of the sole JCB brand. In March 2014 JCB announced that the Gaterslaben factory would be closed, with production of pedestrian compaction products moving to JCB Attachments in Uttoxeter, England by June 2014. Production of larger compaction equipment moved to JCB's Pune factories in India.

The old Vibromax machines were painted a burnt orange and brown colour while the machines of Vibromax GmbH Gatersleben were painted yellow and later the JCB models yellow and black.

== List of models ==
Single Drum Compactors Smooth/Padfoot

Old product range, production in Düsselorf

- 1101, 1601, 1801
- 602, 1102, 1402, 1802

New Product range, developed by Vibromax GmbH Gatersleben

- VM46, VM66, VM106, VM116, VM146, VM166, VM186 - These machines were the last Vibromax models and were branded JCB Vibromax after the takeover

Tandem Drum Compactors

- W102, W152, W554, W752, W854
- W255, W265, W355, W365, W455, W465, W862, W864

Pedestrian operated Vibrating Plates

ATS 6002, AT15, AT25, AT35, AT45

Pedestrian operated roller

W62, W70, W100

Towed Vibrating Compactors

- W501, W651

== Gallery ==
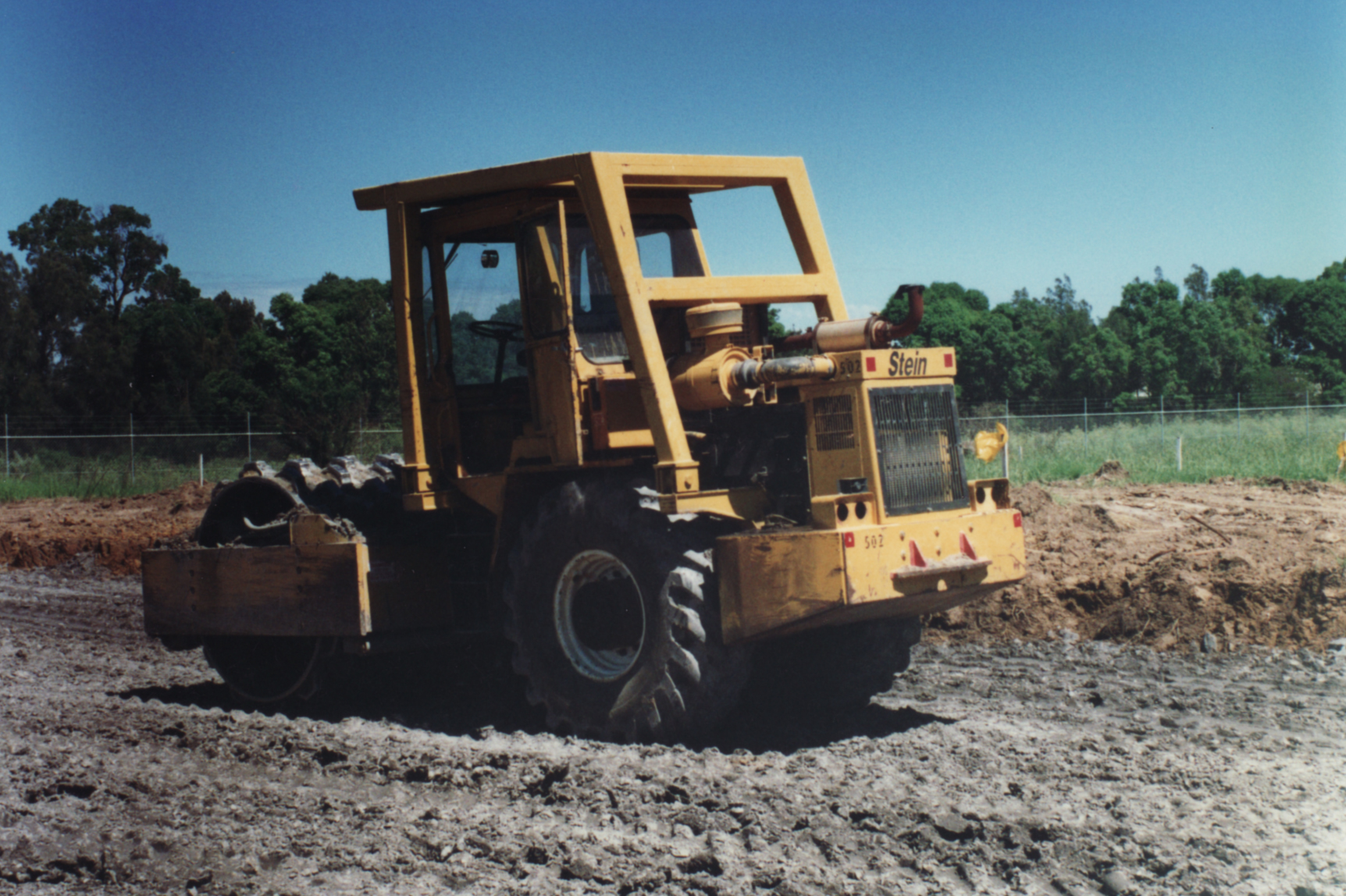
A series 1 Vibromax 1801 Single Drum Vibrating roller

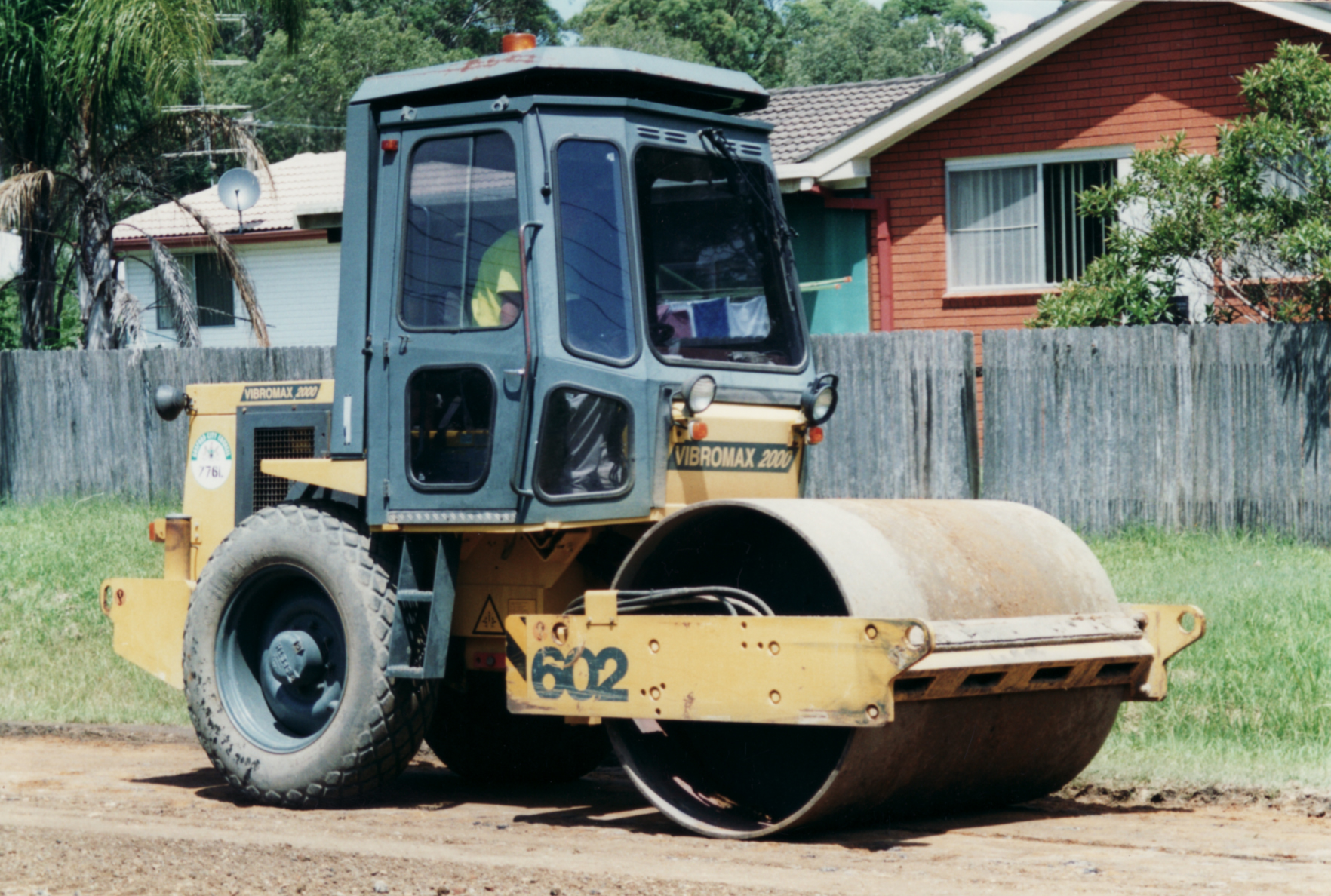
A series 2 Vibromax 602 Single drum Vibrating roller with two person cab

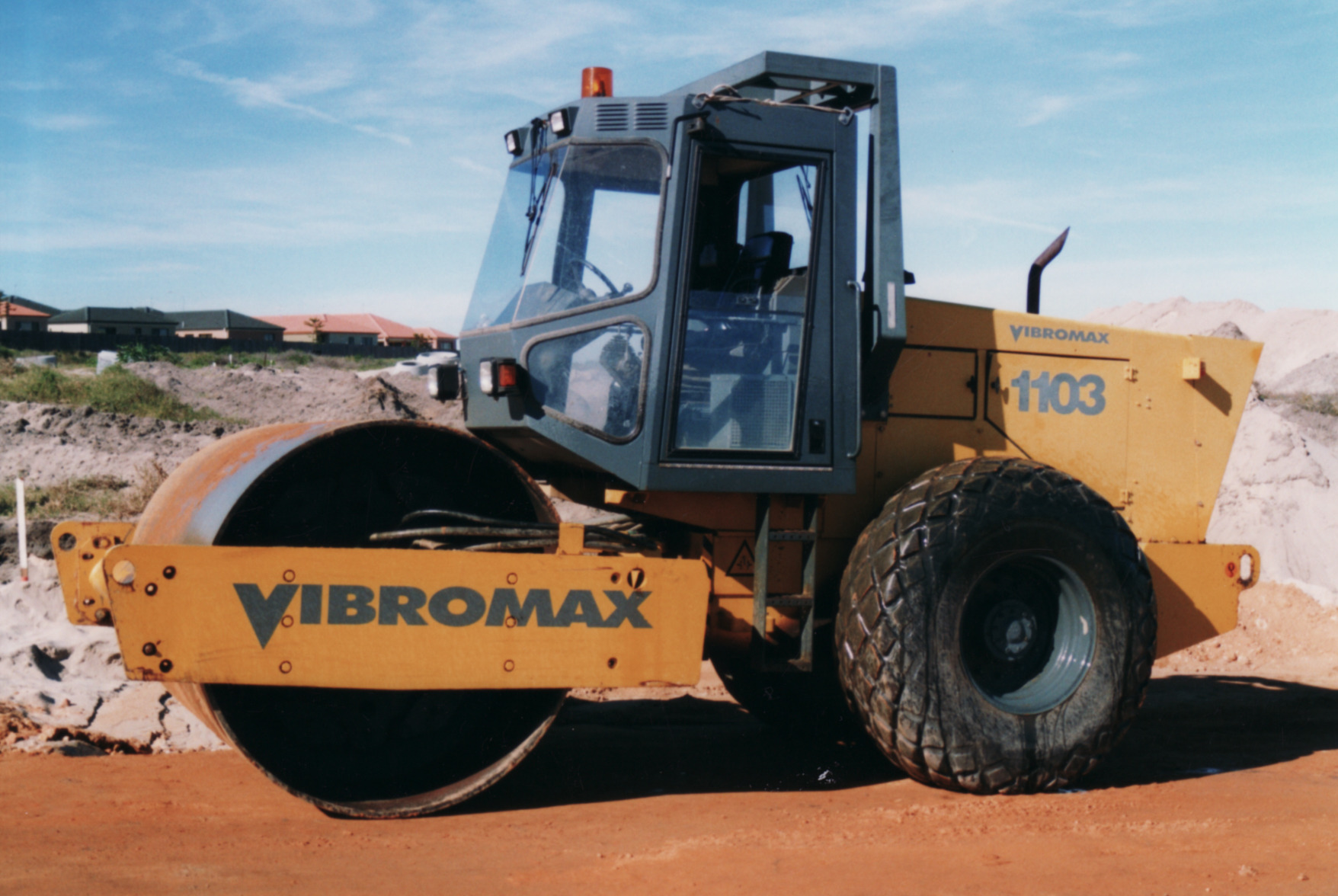
A series 3 Vibromax 1103 Single drum Vibrating roller

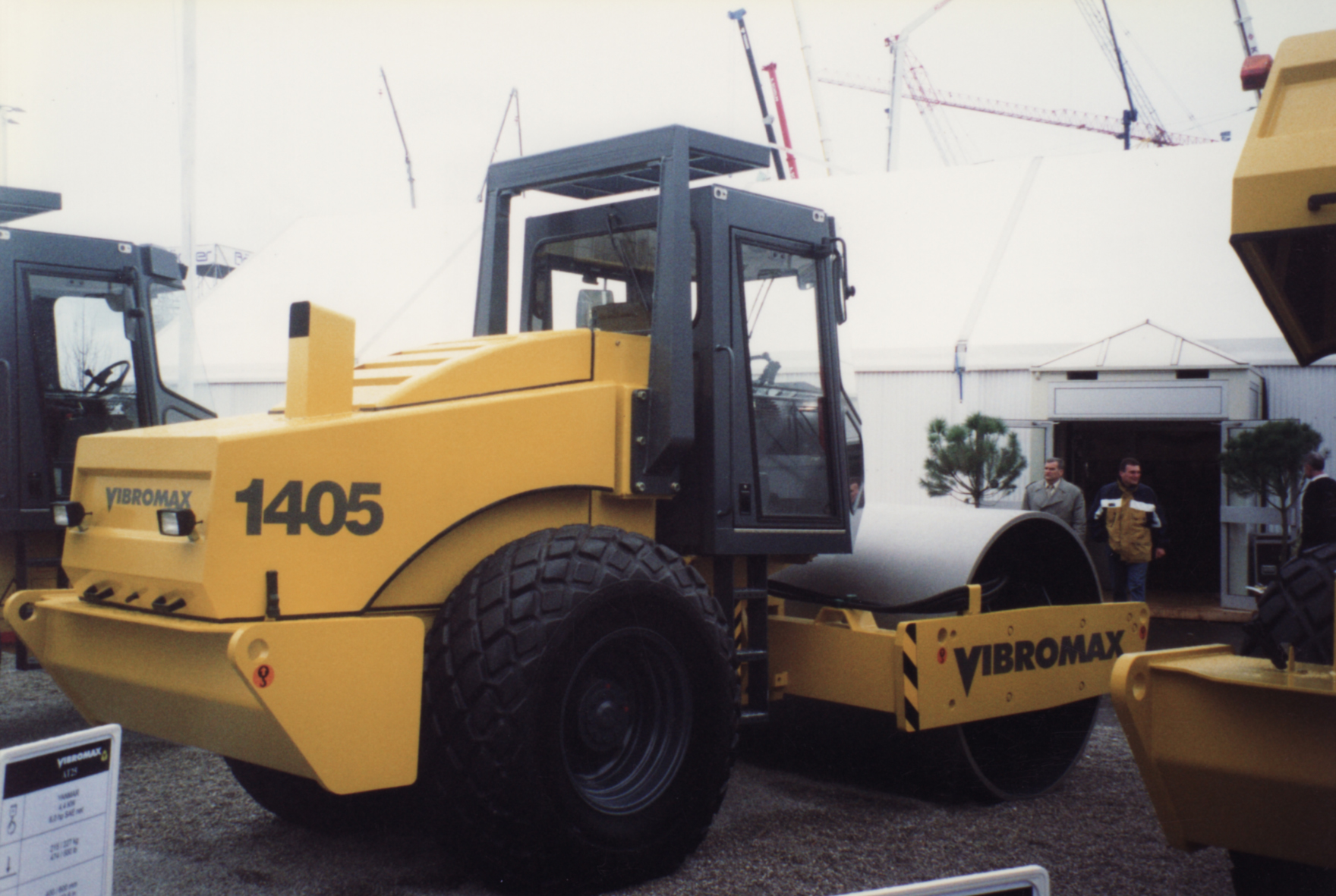
A series 5 Vibromax 1405 Single drum vibrating roller

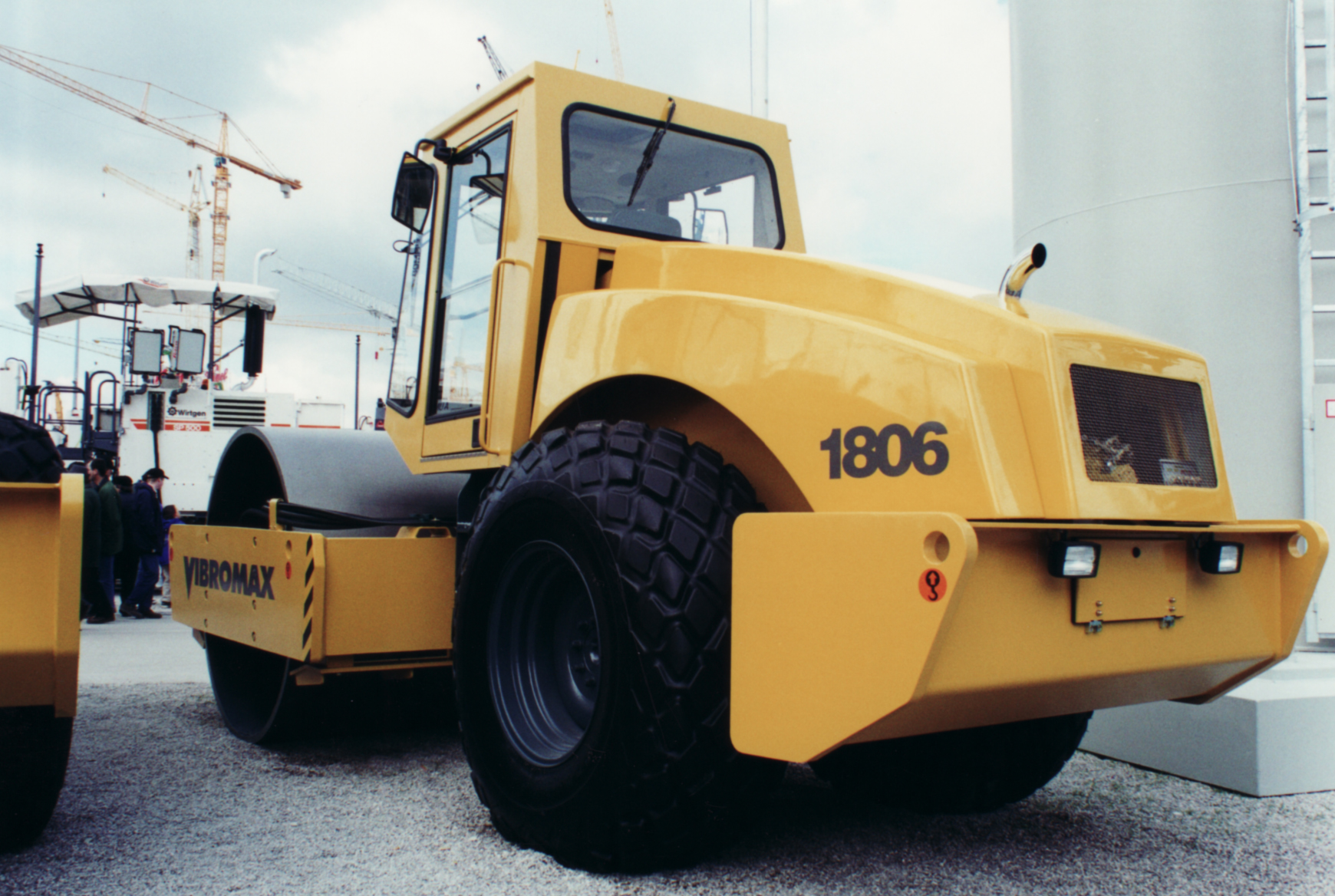
A series 6 Vibromax 1806 Single drum vibrating roller

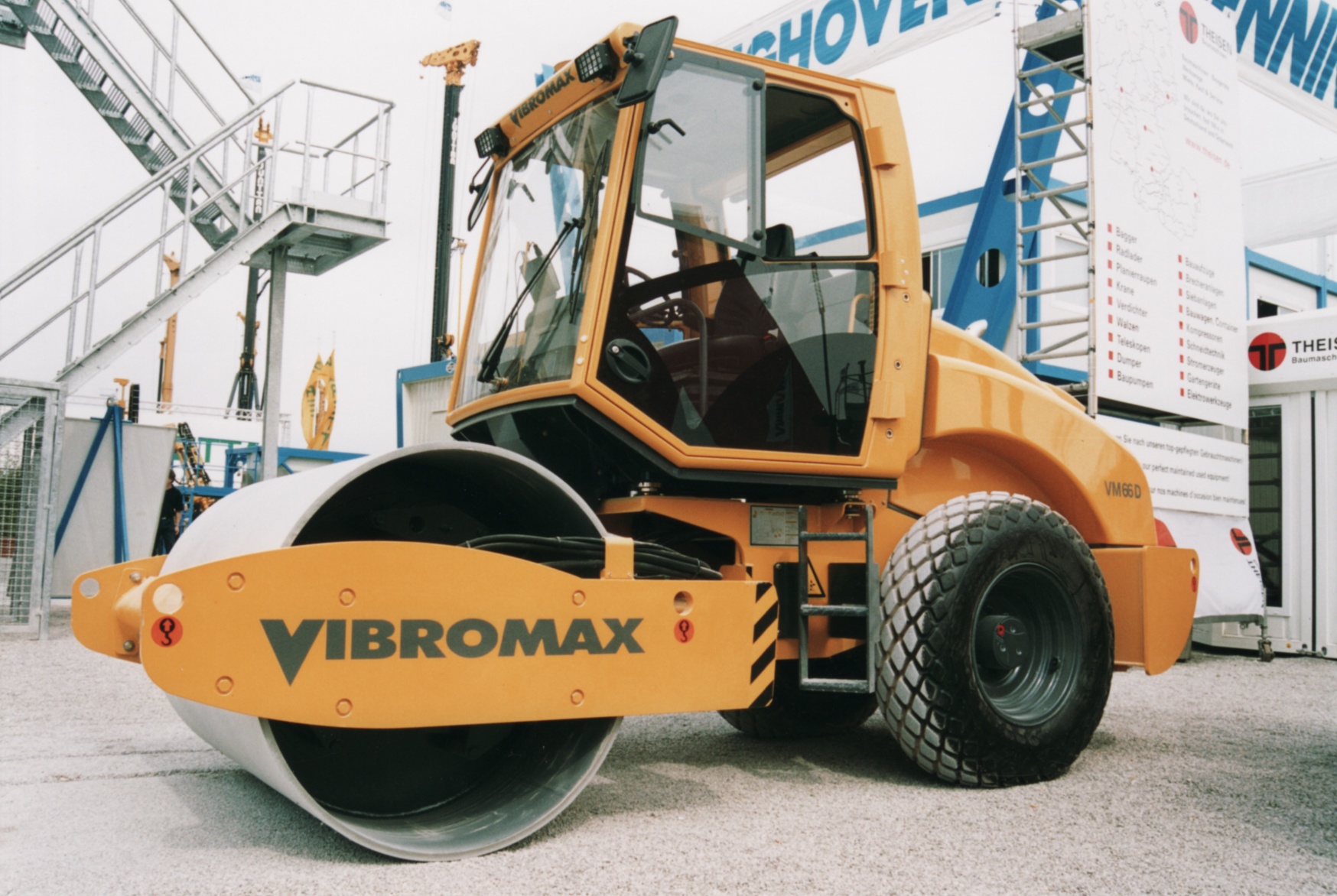
The new generation model VM66 Roller-the last before JCB took control.

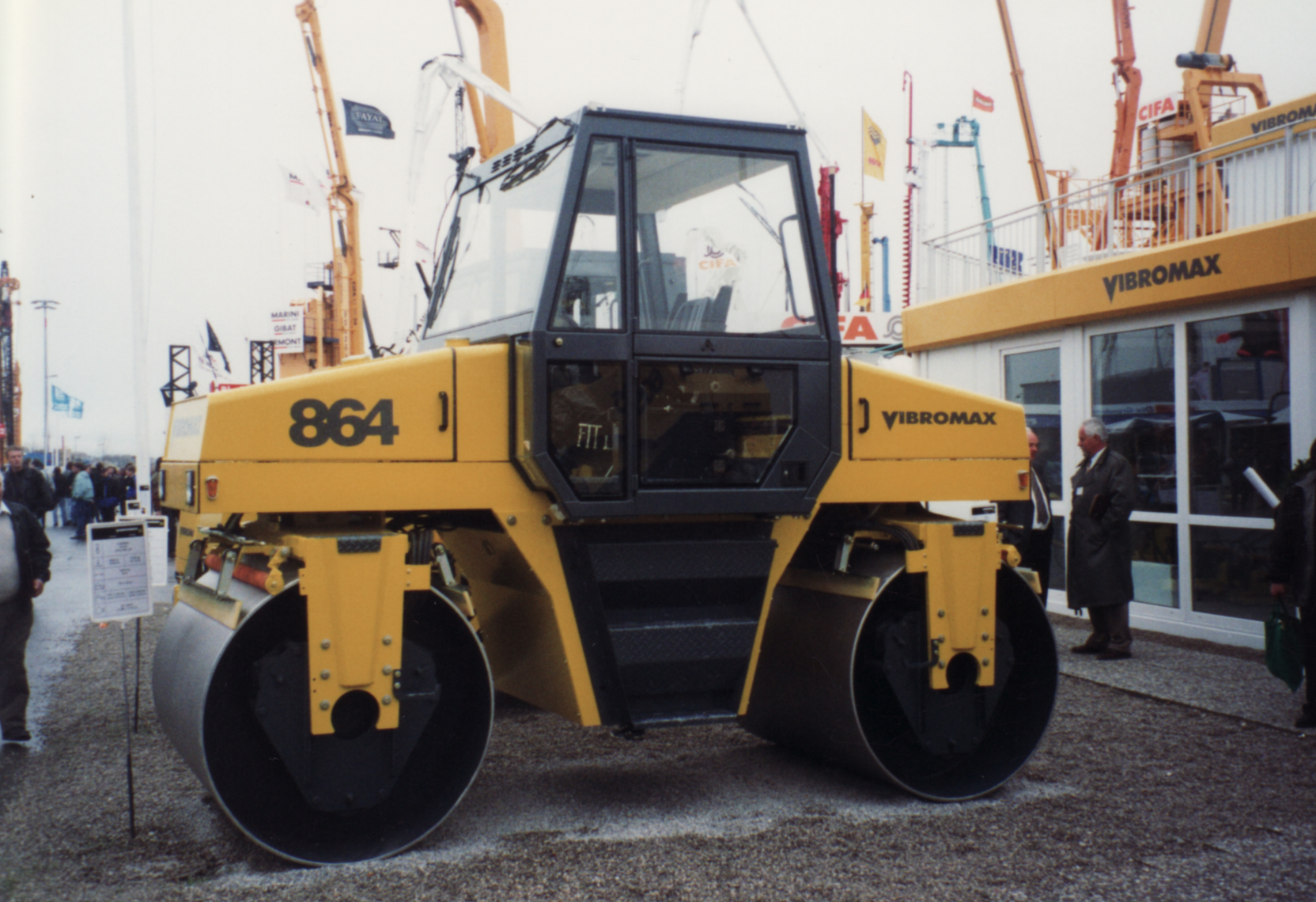
A Vibromax 864 Tandem vibrating roller

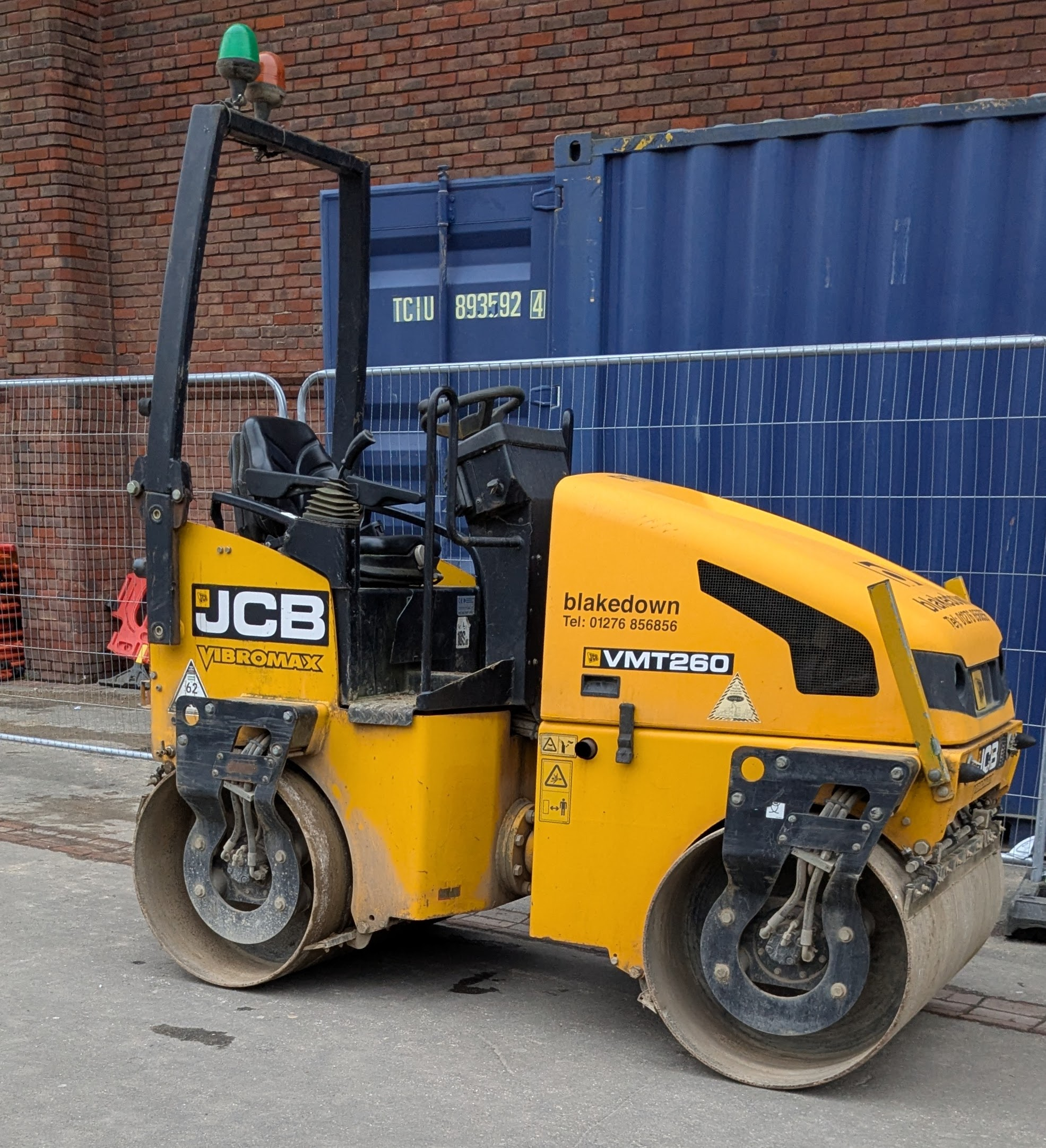
JCB VMT260 Vibrating Road Roller - Camberley, UK - General View

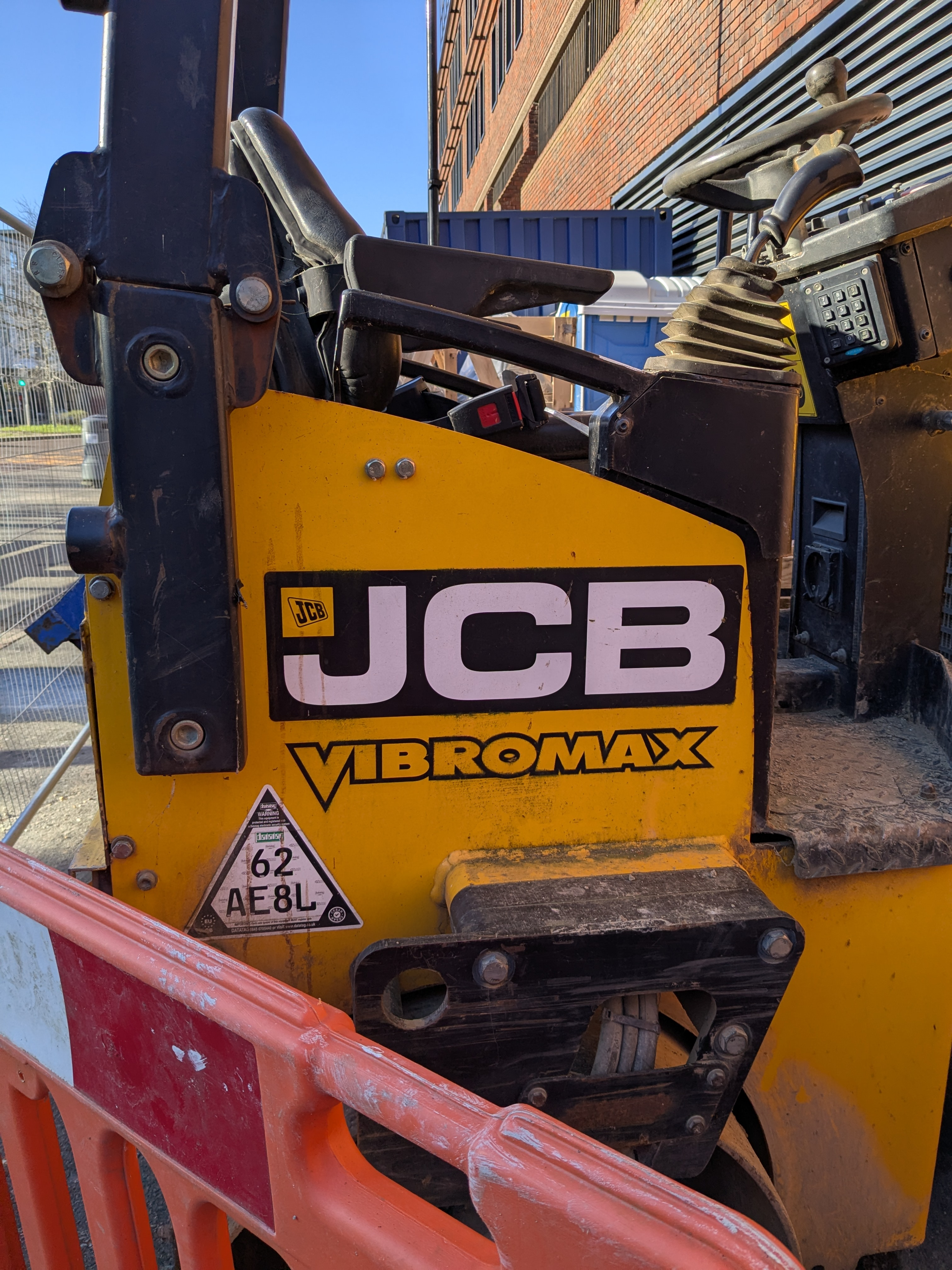
JCB VMT260 Vibrating Road Roller - Camberley, UK - JCB Vibromax Badging
