= BOMAG =

German manufacturing company

BOMAG GmbH
- Type: Limited liability company (Gesellschaft mit beschränkter Haftung)
- Industry: Mechanical engineering
- Founded: 1957
- Founder: Benno Kaltenegger
- Headquarters: Boppard, Germany
- Key people: Dr. Ingo Ettischer (CEO); Dirk Woll (CFO)
- Total assets: 1.05 billion Euro turnover by the BOMAG Group
- Number of employees: About 2800 employees worldwide
- Website: www.bomag.com

Bopparder Maschinenbau-Gesellschaft mbH, better known by the acronym BOMAG, is a German company and a global market leader in compaction technology and manufactures soil, asphalt and refuse compaction equipment, as well as stabilizers and recyclers. In 2005 BOMAG was acquired by the Fayat Group and since then also sells asphalt pavers and cold planers under the BOMAG label.

In addition to its headquarters in Boppard, the company has five other regional branches in Germany, located in Berlin, Chemnitz, Hanover, Munich, and Stuttgart. Furthermore, the company currently owns twelve subsidiaries operating in Austria, Poland, France, Italy, the United Kingdom, Russia, Brazil, Canada, Singapore, the United States, and the People's Republic of China. 500 dealers in over 120 countries ensure the global distribution of BOMAG products. BOMAG employs approximately 2,500 people in total, with around 1,500 at the main location in Boppard. The company is thus among the 30 largest employers in Rhineland-Palatinate.

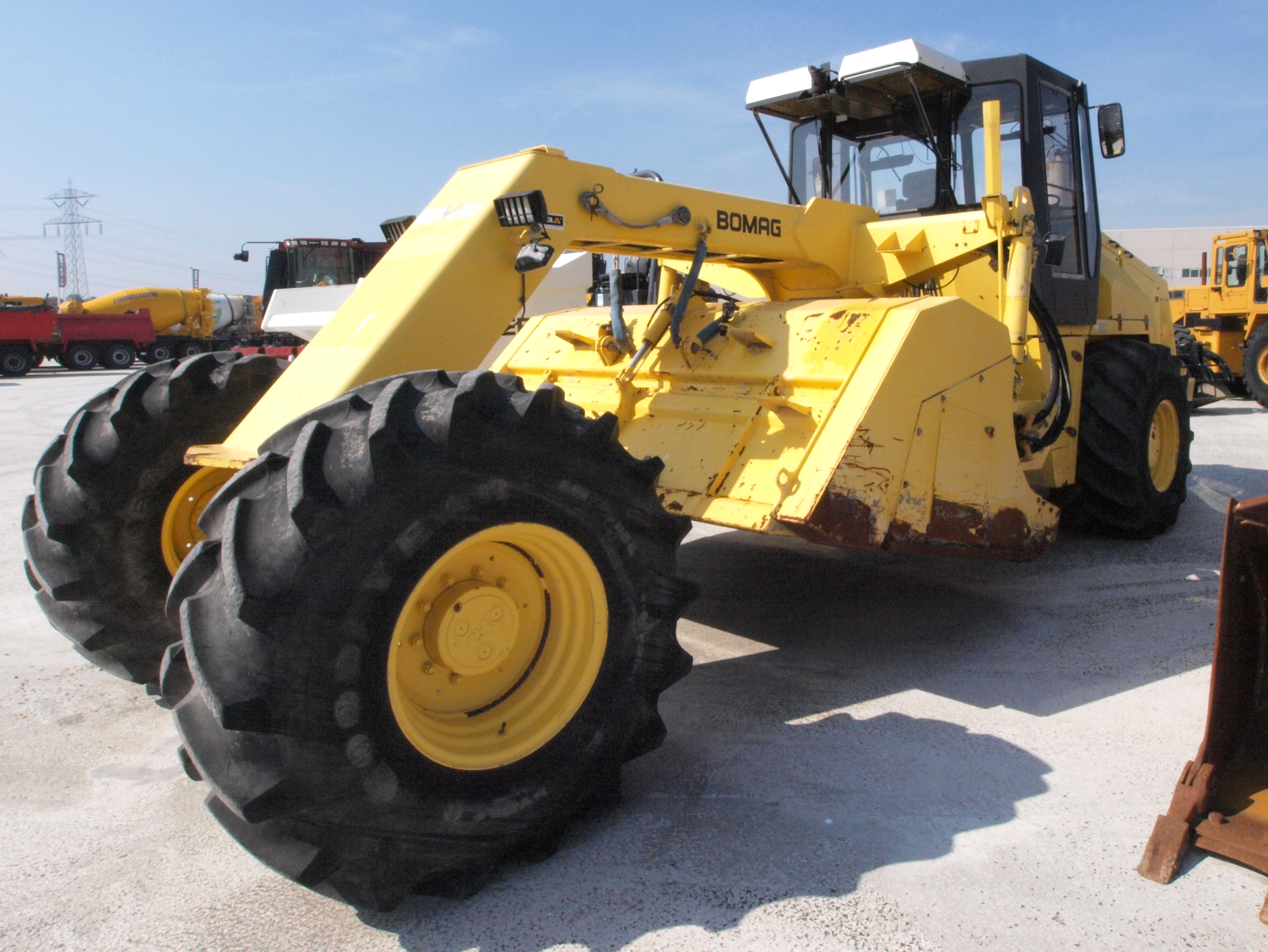
Bomag MPH 121

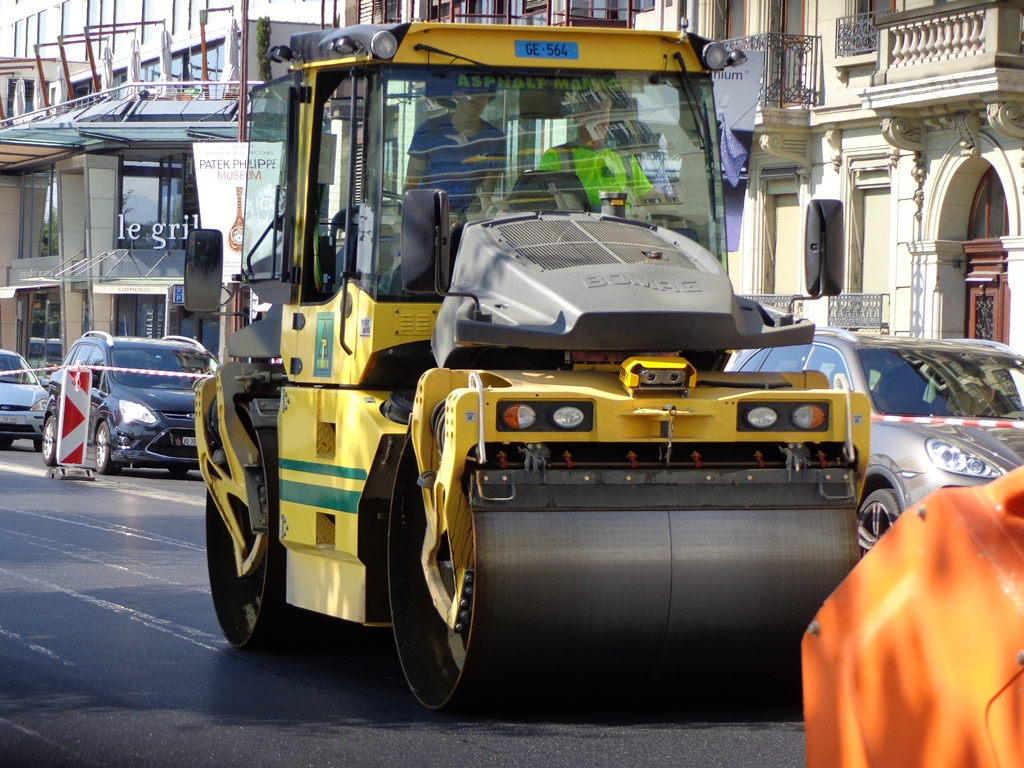
Bomag Compactor

== Company history ==
BOMAG was founded in 1957 by Karl Heinz Schwamborn in Boppard. In the same year he developed a new design for compaction technology for a model of a double vibratory roller with all-drum drive.

In 1962 the first 7t double vibratory roller in the world was launched. The first branch office abroad opened in 1961 in Austria, followed by branches in China, the USA, France, Italy, Great Britain, Canada, Japan and Hungary up to 2002.

In 1970 Schwamborn sold the company to the American company Koehring.

The original site in Boppard was no longer adequate, so the company moved in 1969 to the Hellerwald industrial estate in the district of Buchholz (Boppard) where it remains today. A research centre was added seven years later. In 1982 production and steel engineering operations on the 7,000 m² site were expanded. Four years later a further 10,000 m² were developed for assembly, testing and painting heavy machinery. A powder coating plant was installed in 1997, and the site expanded again by 9,000 m² in 1998.

Koehring sold its interest in BOMAG in 2001 to the American company SPX Corporation, which in turn sold the company again in 2005 to the French corporate group Fayat.

In 2011, BOMAG acquired 90,000 square meters of the Hellerwald II industrial park to further expand the production area located in Hellerwald I. The company invested €21.5 million—the largest single investment in BOMAG's history—in the construction of a state-of-the-art drum factory, which was built within 12 months and put into operation at the end of June 2013.

== Products ==
BOMAG offers more than 20 product groups with numerous product variations from the following categories:

- Compaction (Rammers, Vibratory Plates, Vibratory Rollers, Multipurpose Compactors)
- Asphalt Construction (Tandem Rollers, Combination Rollers, Pneumatic Tyre Rollers, Road Pavers)
- Earthworks (Single Drum Rollers, Soil Compactors)
- Recycling and Stabilization (Cold Planers, Cold Recyclers, Soil Stabilizers)
- Waste Management (Landfill Compactors)
