= Compactor =

Machine

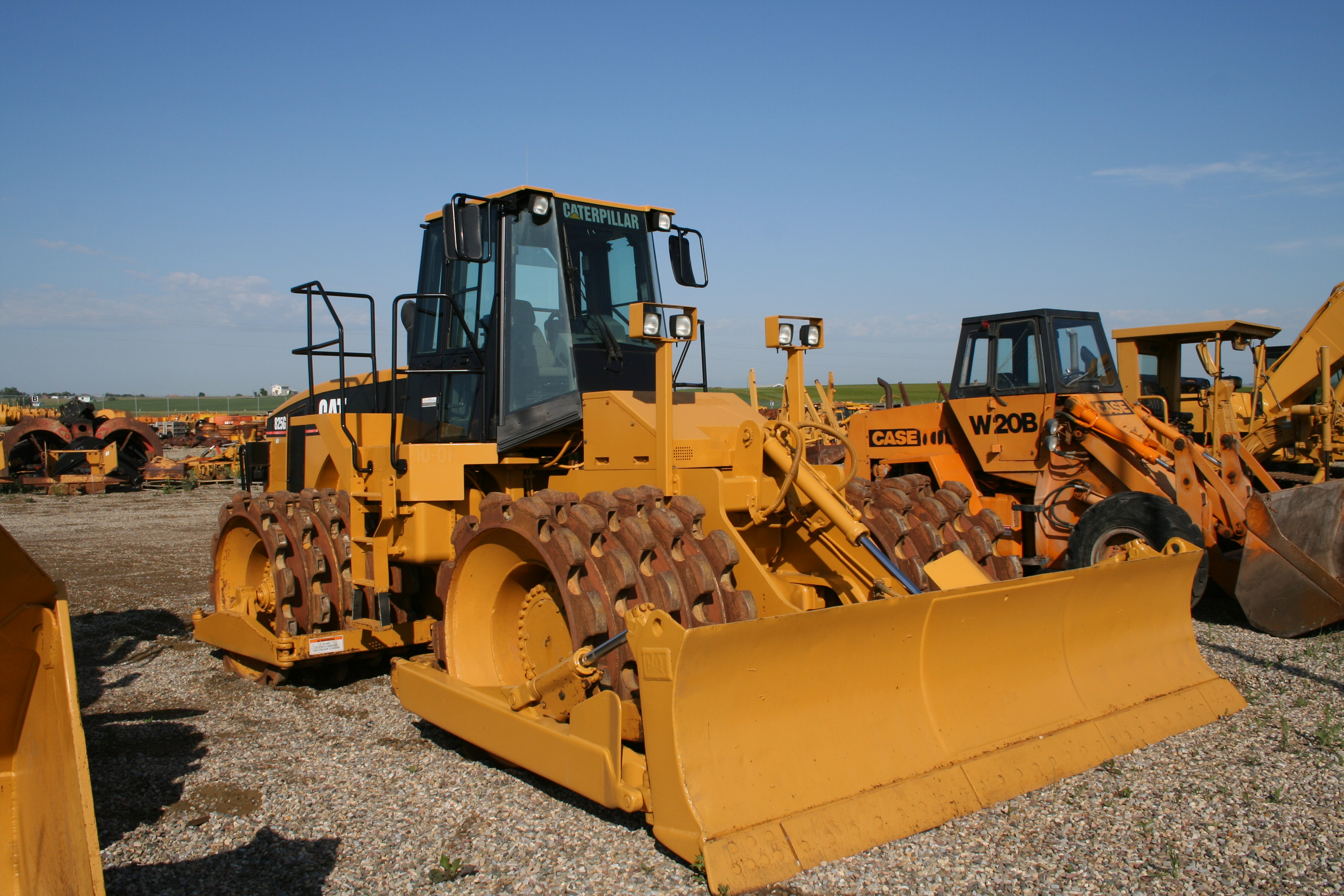
Soil compactor

A compactor is a machine or mechanism used to reduce the size of material such as waste material or biomass through compaction. A trash compactor is used in business and public places like hospitals (and in the United States also in homes) to reduce the volume of trash they produce. A baler-wrapper compactor is used for making compact and wrapped bales in order to improve logistics.

Normally powered by hydraulics, compactors take many shapes and sizes. In landfill sites for example, a large tractor (typically a converted front end loader with some variant of a bulldozer blade attached) with spiked steel wheels called a landfill compactor is used to drive over waste deposited by waste collection vehicles (WCVs).

WCVs themselves incorporate a compacting mechanism which is used to increase the payload of the vehicle and reduce the number of times it has to empty. This usually takes the form of hydraulically powered sliding plates which sweep out the collection hopper and compress the material into what has already been loaded.

Different compactors are used in scrap metal processing, the most familiar being the car crusher. Such devices can be of either the "pancake" type, where a scrap automobile is flattened by a huge descending hydraulically powered plate, or the baling press, where the automobile is compressed from several directions until it resembles a large cube

== Commercial use ==
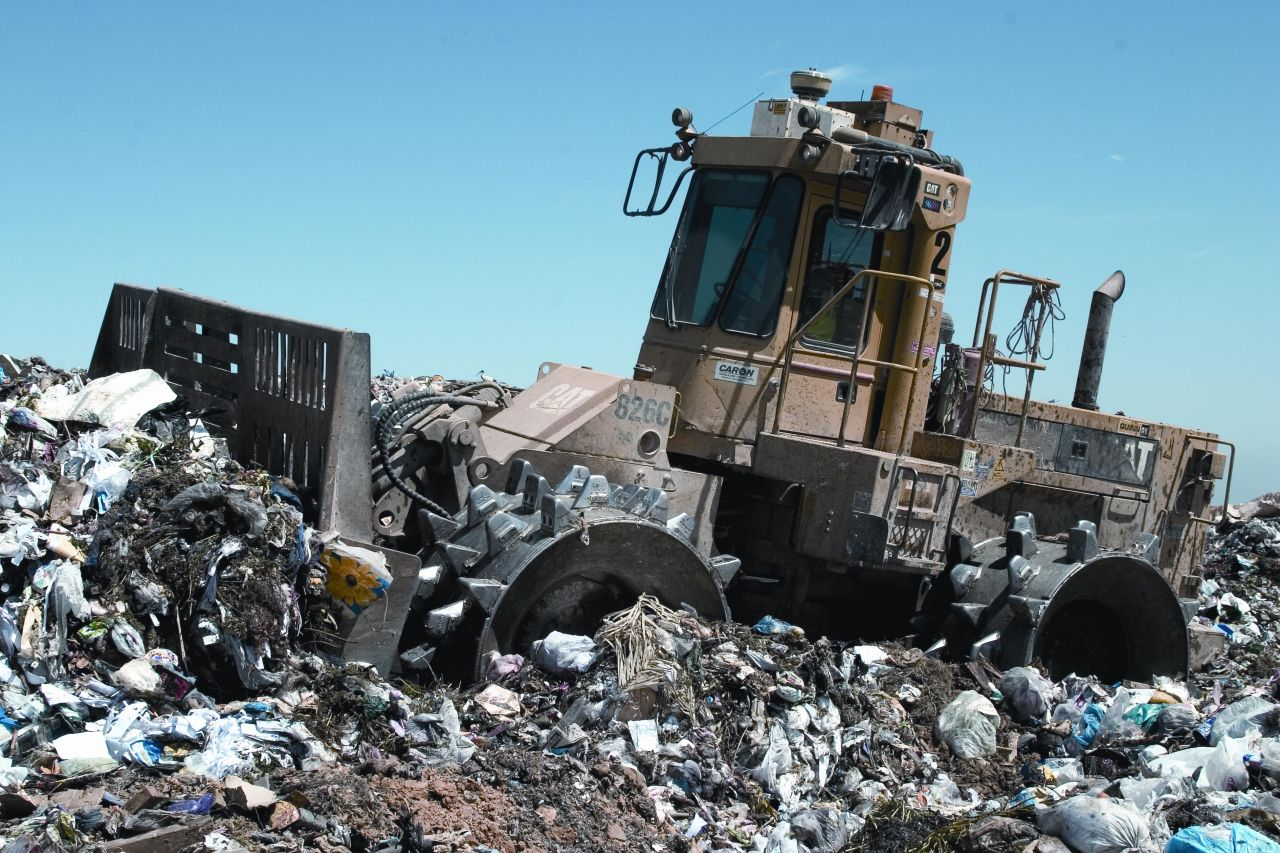
Landfill compactor

Many retail and service businesses, such as fast food, restaurants, and hotels, use compactors to reduce the volume of non-recyclable waste as well as curb nuisance such as rodents and smell. In the hospitality industry tolerance for such nuisances is particularly low. These compactors typically come in electric and hydraulic operation, with quite a few loading configurations. Most popular loading configurations fall under the following:

- Ground-access;
- Walk-on;
- Secured indoor chute.

These compactors are almost exclusively of welded steel construction for two reasons: durability under pressure and exposure to the elements, as compactors are installed either completely outdoors or sometimes under a covered loading dock.

== Agricultural use ==
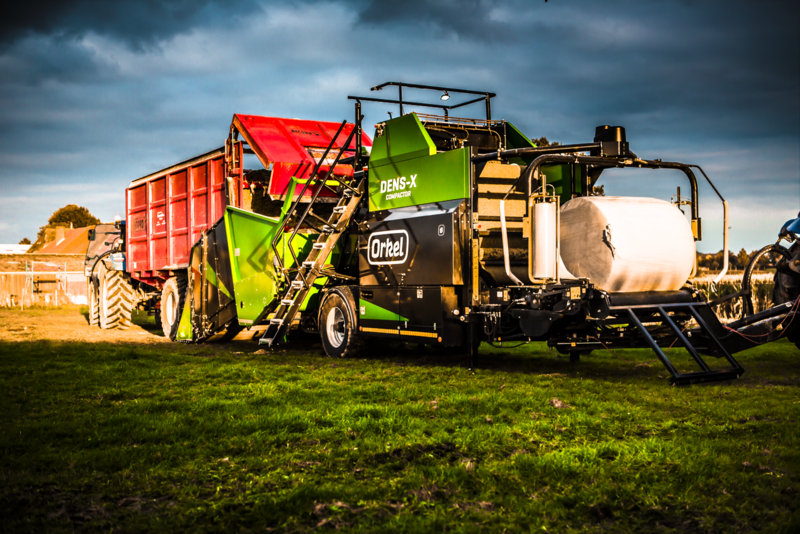
Agricultural baler-wrapper compactor

As a means to preserve and store forage, baler-wrapper compactors are used to exclude oxygen from the forage and wrap it in air tight film. Without access to air the forage is preserved fresh for longer periods of time.

== Residential use ==
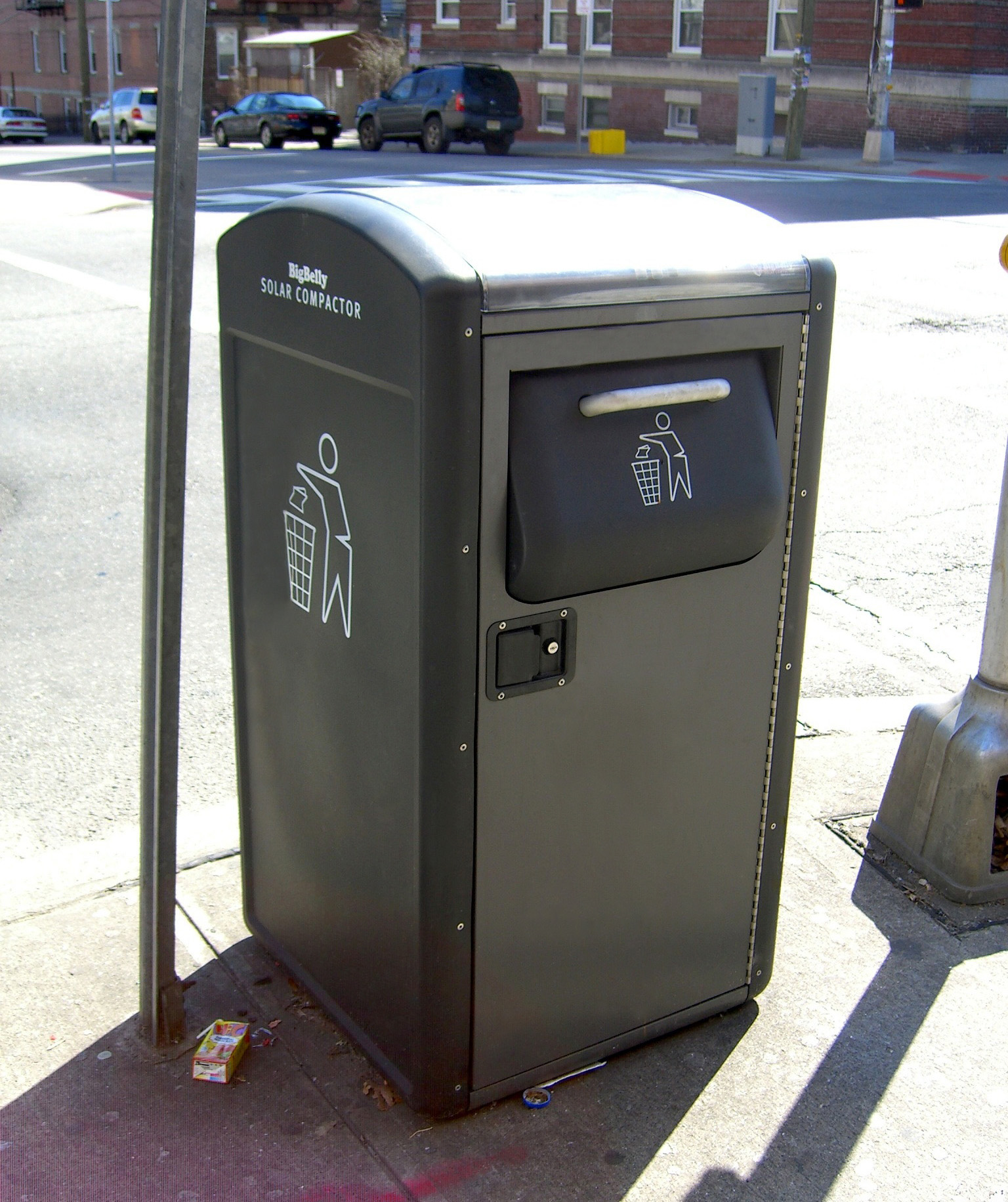
A solar trash compactor on a residential corner in Jersey City, New Jersey.

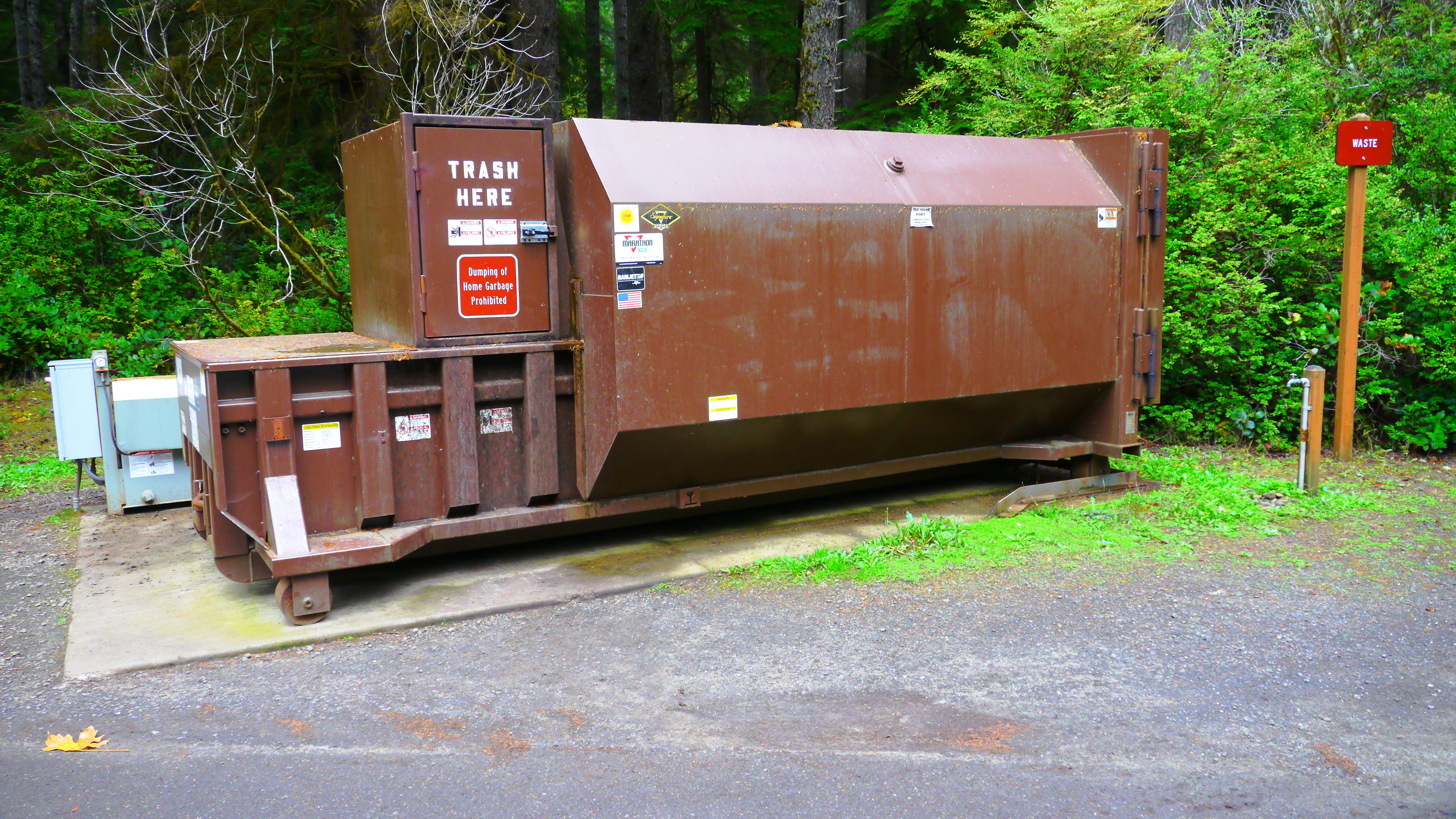
Example of a larger mechanical compactor

In the United States, there are also trash compactors, hydraulic or manual, designed for residential use. Likewise, they reduce the volume of garbage. For example, some compactors reduce the volume of polystyrene to 1/30.

== Municipal use ==
In the United States, in addition to the waste vehicle and landfill use, there are solar-powered trash compactors that can hold the equivalent of 200 US gallons (760 L; 170 imp gal) of trash before they need to be emptied.

The large compactors in garbage trucks can be dangerous for workers, and played a role in the US Civil Rights Movement. The 1968 Memphis sanitation strike took place when two sanitation workers were crushed to death in garbage compactors, after which 700 of their 1300 black coworkers decided to strike.

== Recycling and energy ==
Baler-wrapper compactors are used for efficient storage and transport of materials like RDF (refuse-derived fuel) and bin waste, as well as compost and saw dust, enabling higher rates of recycling.

== Construction industry ==
In construction, there are three main types of compactor: the plate, the rammer, and the road roller. The roller type compactors are used for compacting crushed rock as the base layer underneath concrete or stone foundations or slabs. The plate compactor, vibrating plate, or tamper, has a large vibrating baseplate and is suited for creating a level grade, while the rammer compactor has a smaller foot. The rammer, or trench rammer, is mainly used to compact the backfill in narrow trenches for water or gas supply pipes etc. Road rollers may also have vibrating rollers.

In plates and rollers, the vibration is provided by rapidly rotating eccentric masses. In smaller plates, the vibration causes a tendency to move forwards, while some larger plates are provided with a directional control. In the rammer the foot is mounted on a sleeve that slides vertically in the leg. Inside the sleeve, a piston is driven up and down by the engine through a reduction gear, crank and connecting rod. Substantial coil springs above and below the piston connect it to the sliding sleeve. The connection between the sleeve and foot is at a small angle so that the whole rammer leans away from the operator. The vibrating motion is therefore slightly off the vertical, and this gives the rammer a tendency to 'walk' forwards. The sliding joint in the leg is protected by a flexible bellows.

In England the name "wacker plate" or just "wacker" is commonly used to refer to plate compactors, derived from the name of Wacker Neuson, a well-known manufacturer of such devices. The name is pronounced in the English style as whacker, as opposed to the correct German vacker. A rammer is colloquially referred to as "Paddy's Motorbike", due to the traditional resource of Irish construction labourers, and the way that the operator appears to "ride" the hammer holding the handles like a motorcycle.

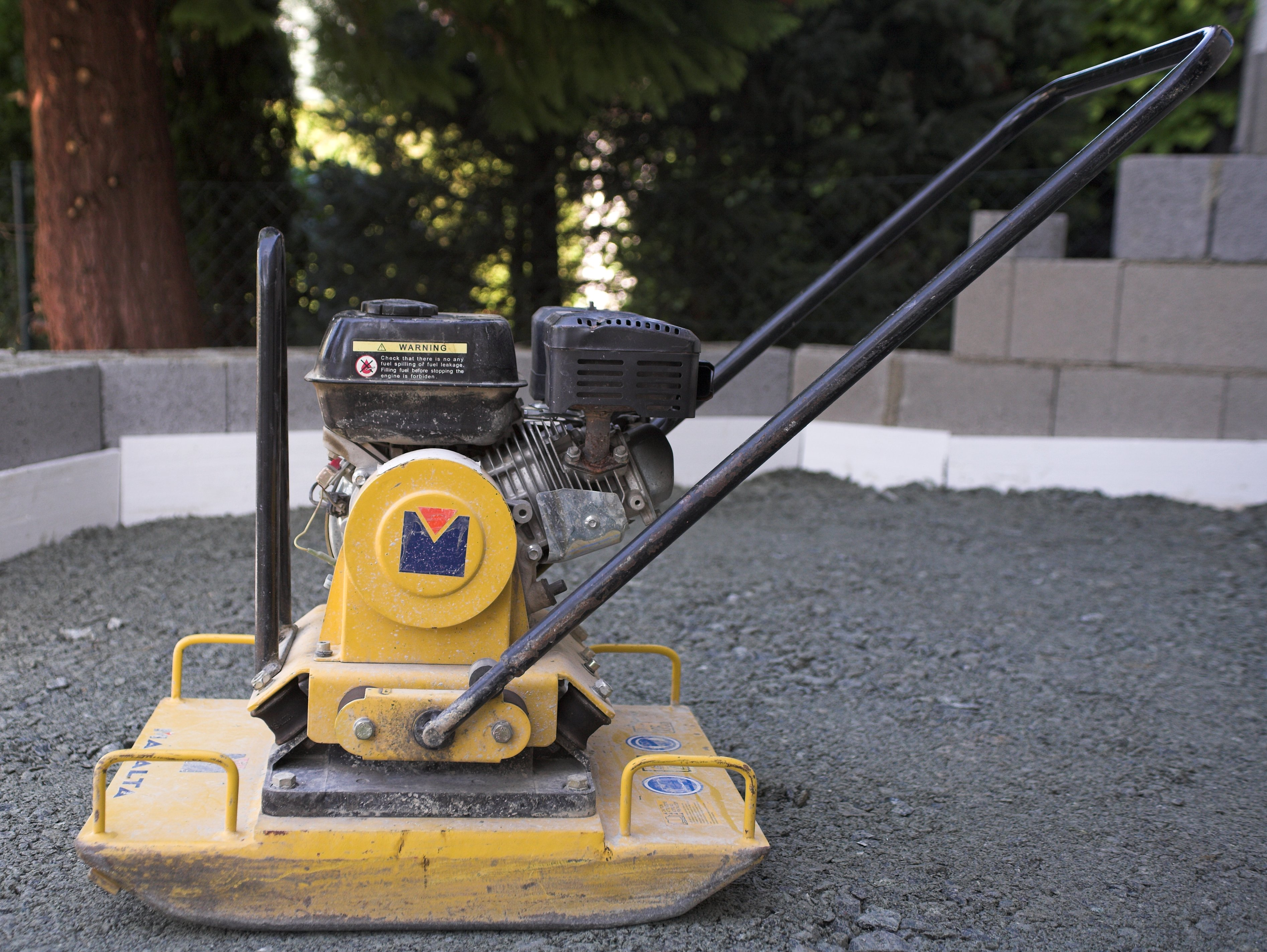
A small plate compactor

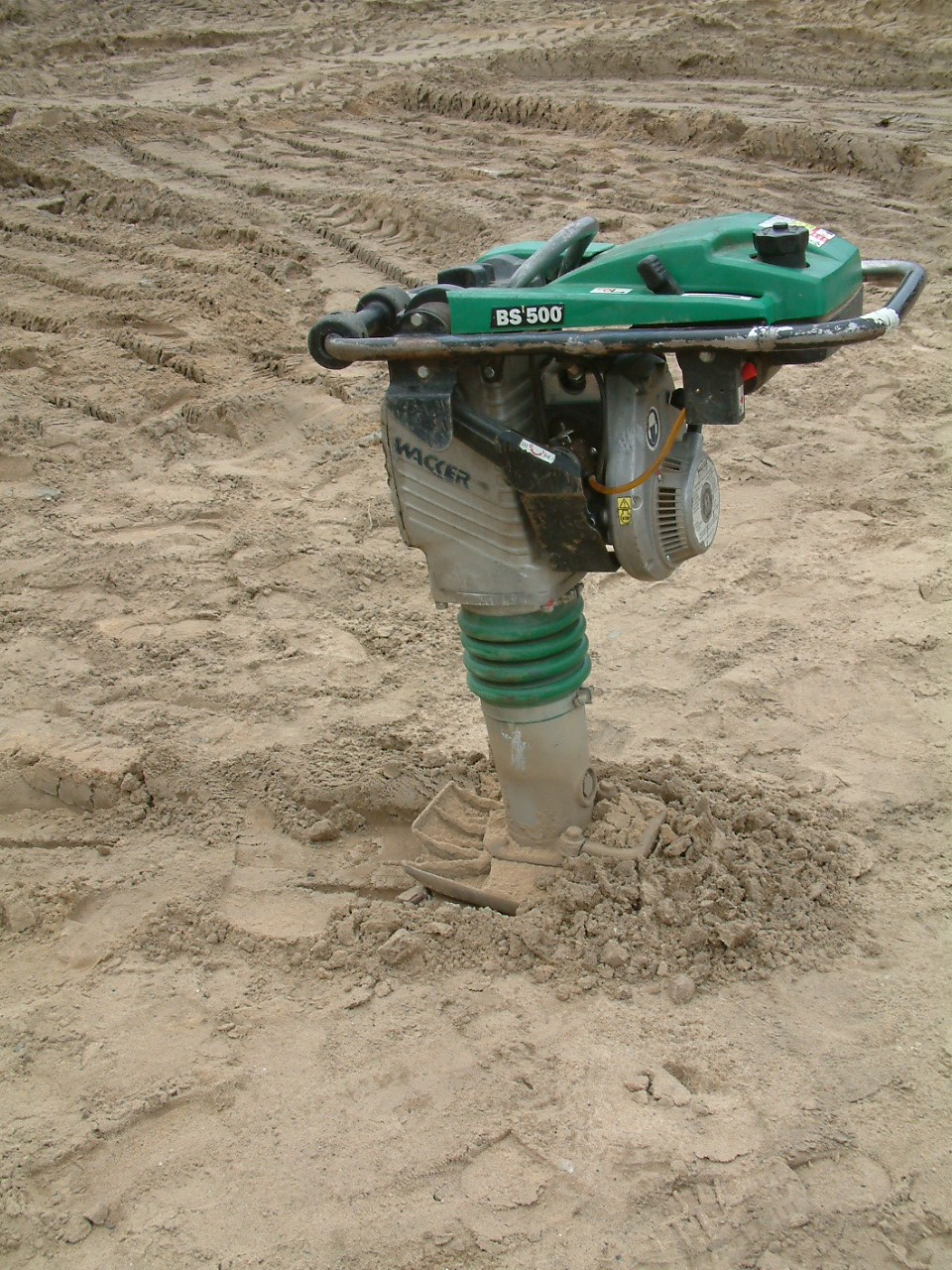
A rammer compactor

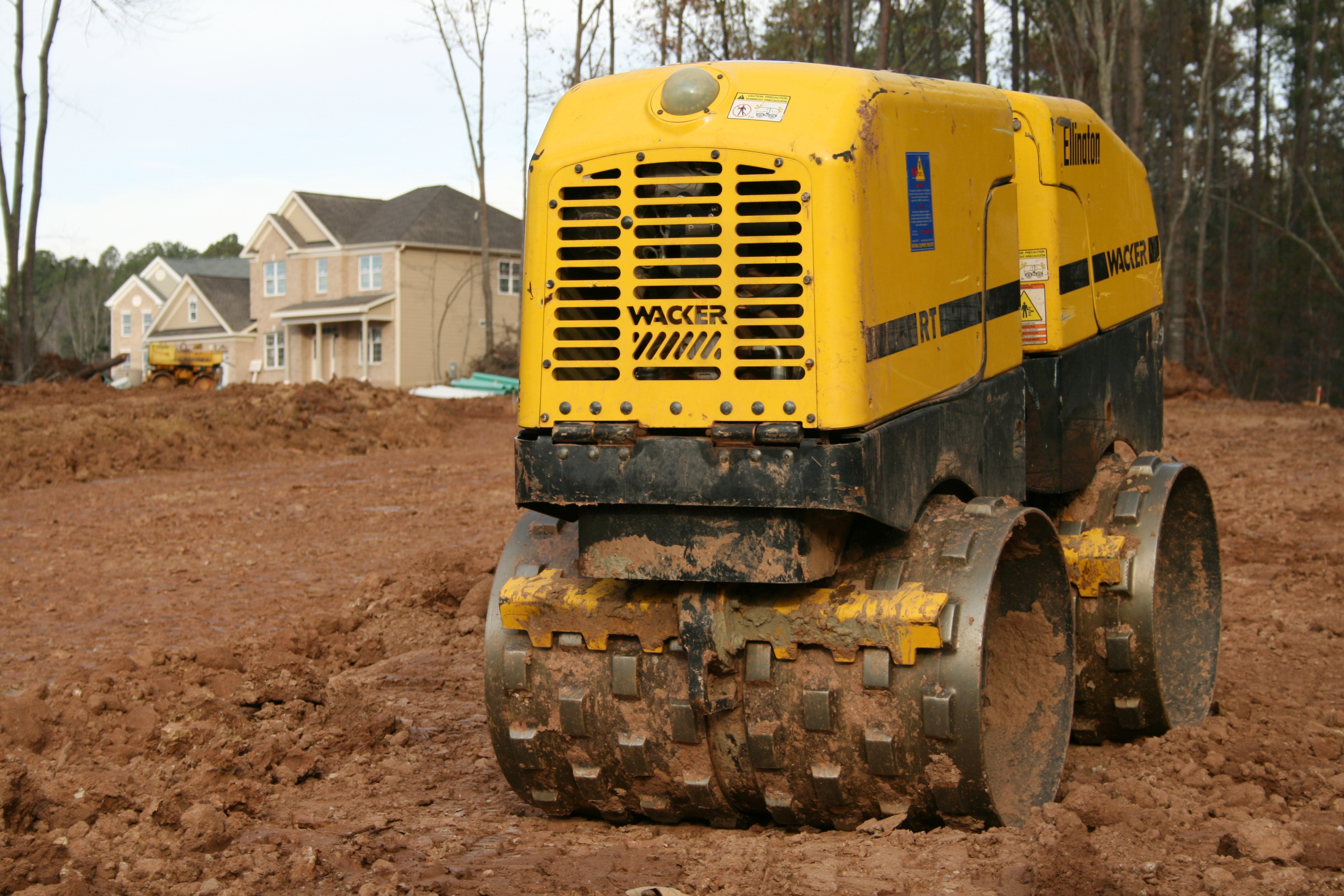
A trench roller operated by remote control for operator safety

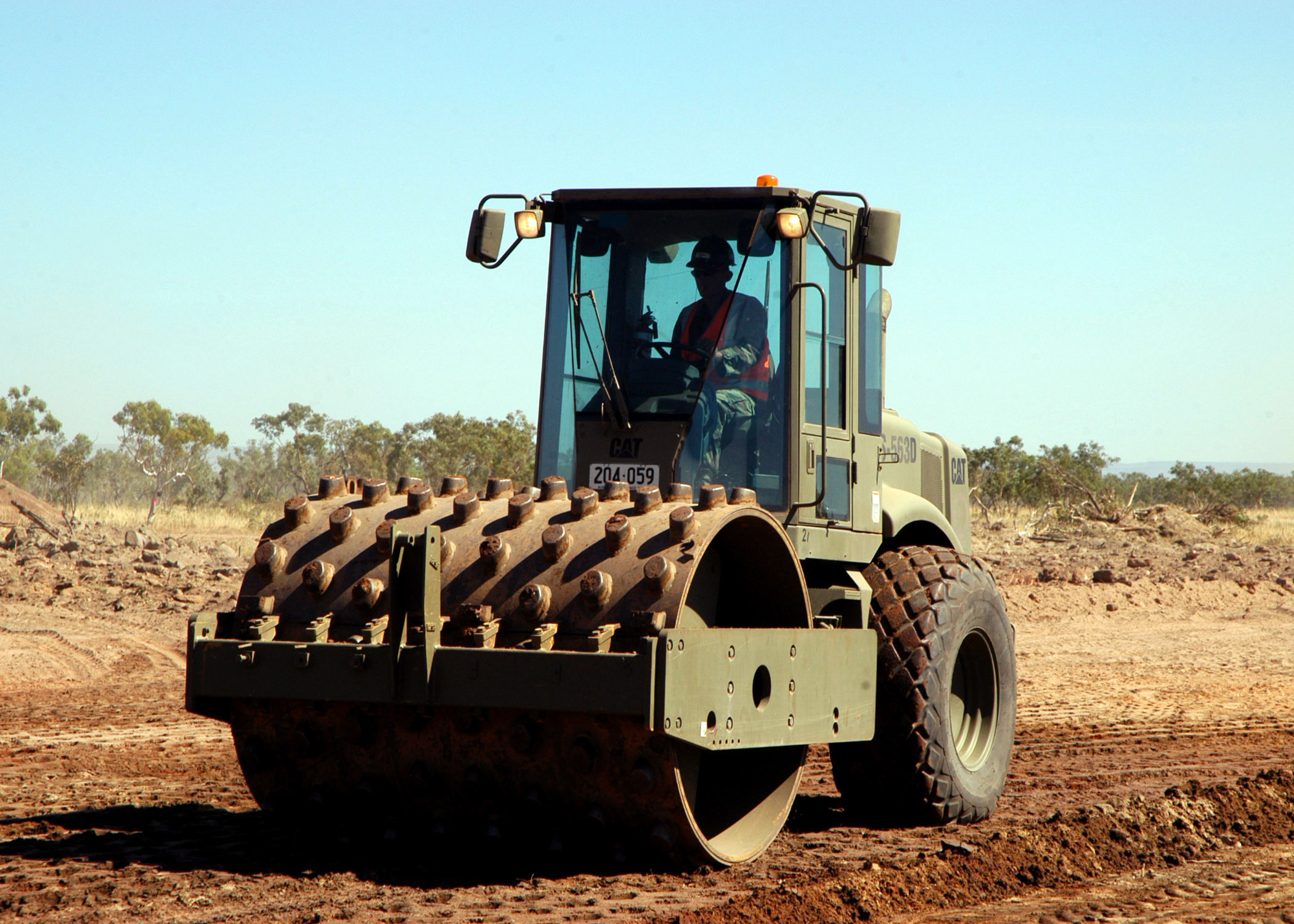
Large roller "sheepsfoot" compactor for use on soil

== Patents ==
- U.S. patent 2,234,098 — Can crusher and baler — 1941
- U.S. patent 7,145,450 — Compactor Service & Monitoring System — 2006

== See also ==
- Road roller
- Shredding (disambiguation)
- Soil compaction
- Tamp
- Waste compaction
