= Shredding =

Shredding, shred, shredder, or shredders may refer to:

== Equipment ==
- Industrial shredder
- Paper shredder
- Scrap metal shredder
- Woodchipper, or tree shredder

== Arts, entertainment, and media ==
=== Films ===
- Shred (film), a 2008 film by David Mitchell
- Shredder (film), a 2003 film by Craig Donald Carlson and Greg Huson

=== Other uses in arts, entertainment, and media ===
- Shred guitar, a speed-based virtuoso style of electric guitar playing
  - "X Shreds" or "Shreds" videos parodying shred guitar, first created by Santeri Ojala in 2007
- Shredder (Teenage Mutant Ninja Turtles), a supervillain in the Teenage Mutant Ninja Turtles franchise
- Shredders (music group), an American hip hop group
- Shredder, a 1973 album by The Wackers
- "Shredder", a 1998 single by Christopher Lawrence
- Shredders (video game), a 2022 snowboarding video game by Foampunch

== Computing ==
- Shred (Unix), a Unix command for secure file deletion
- Shredder (software), a chess program developed by Stefan Meyer-Kahlen
- Shredding (data remanence), overwriting storage media with new data to erase it
- Shredding (disassembling genomic data), in bioinformatics
- Shredder, the alpha build of Mozilla Thunderbird

== Sports ==
- Shredding, the activity of street skateboarding
- Shredding, an activity of skiing
- Shredding, an activity of snowboarding
- Shredding, an activity of mountain biking
- Shredding, an activity of bodybuilding also known as cutting

== Other uses ==
- Shred Optics, a manufacturer of sunglasses, helmets, and goggles
- Shredder, an inflatable whitewater craft
- Shredders (organisms), in the River Continuum Concept, organisms that feed on particulate organic material
- Shredding (tree-pruning technique)

== See also ==
- Food processor, a small appliance that can shred
- Garbage disposal unit, of kitchen sinks (or its grinding component particularly)
- Grater, a kitchen tool that can shred foods
- Spoliation of evidence, a legal term for shredding of documents
- Stracciatella (disambiguation)
