= Proctor compaction test =

Soil moisture test

The Proctor compaction test is a laboratory method of experimentally determining the optimal moisture content at which a given soil type will become most dense and achieve its maximum dry density. The test is named in honor of Ralph Roscoe Proctor, who in 1933 showed that the dry density of a soil for a given compactive effort depends on the amount of water the soil contains during soil compaction. His original test is most commonly referred to as the standard Proctor compaction test; his test was later updated to create the modified Proctor compaction test.

These laboratory tests generally consist of compacting soil at known moisture content into a cylindrical mold with a collar of standard dimensions of height and diameter using a compactive effort of controlled magnitude. The soil is usually compacted into the mold to a certain amount of equal layers, each receiving a number of blows from a standard weighted hammer at a specified height. This process is then repeated for various moisture contents and the dry densities are determined for each. The graphical relationship of the dry density to moisture content is then plotted to establish the compaction curve. The maximum dry density is finally obtained from the peak point of the compaction curve and its corresponding moisture content, also known as the optimal moisture content.

The testing described is generally consistent with the American Society for Testing and Materials (ASTM) standards, and are similar to the American Association of State Highway and Transportation Officials (AASHTO) standards. Currently, the procedures and equipment details for the standard Proctor compaction test is designated by ASTM D698 and AASHTO T99. Also, the modified Proctor compaction test is designated by ASTM D1557 and AASHTO T180-D.

== History ==
Proctor's fascination with geotechnical engineering began when taking his undergraduate studies at University of California, Berkeley. He was interested in the publications of Sir Alec Skempton and his ideas on in situ behavior of natural clays. Skempton formulated concepts and porous water coefficients that are still widely used today. It was Proctor's idea to take this concept a step further and formulate his own experimental conclusions to determine a solution for the in situ behaviors of clay and ground soils that cause it to be unsuitable for construction. His idea, which was later adopted and expounded upon by Skempton, involved the compaction of the soil to establish the maximum practically-achievable density of soils and aggregates (the "practically" stresses how the value is found experimentally and not theoretically) .

In the early 1930s, he finally created a solution for determining the maximum density of soils. Proctor found that in a controlled environment (or within a control volume), the soil could be compacted to the point where the air could be completely removed, simulating the effects of a soil in situ conditions. From this, the dry density could be determined by simply measuring the weight of the soil before and after compaction, calculating the moisture content, and furthermore calculating the dry density. Ralph R. Proctor went on to teach at the University of Arkansas.

In 1958, the modified Proctor compaction test was developed as an ASTM standard. A higher and more relevant compaction standard was necessary. There were larger and heavier compaction equipment, like large vibratory compactors and heavier steel-face rollers. This equipment could produce higher dry densities in soils along with greater stability. These improved properties allowed for the transport of far heavier truck loads over roads and highways. During the 1970s and early 1980s the modified Proctor test became more widely used as a modern replacement for the standard Proctor test.

== Theory of soil compaction ==
Compaction can be generally defined as the densification of soil by the removal of air and rearrangement of soil particles through the addition of mechanical energy. The energy exerted by compaction forces the soil to fill available voids, and the additional frictional forces between the soil particles improves the mechanical properties of the soil. Because a wide range of particles are needed in order to fill all available voids, well-graded soils tend to compact better than poorly graded soils.

The degree of compaction of a soil can be measured by its dry unit weight, γ_{d}. When water is added to the soil, it functions as a softening agent on the soil particles, causing them to slide between one another more easily. At first, the dry unit weight after compaction increases as the moisture content (ω) increases, but after the optimum moisture content (ω_{opt}) percentage is exceeded, any added water will result in a reduction in dry unit weight because the pore water pressure (pressure of water in-between each soil particle) will be pushing the soil particles apart, decreasing the friction between them.

== Comparison of tests ==
The original Proctor test, ASTM D698 / AASHTO T99, uses a 4-inch-diameter (100 mm) by 4.584-inch-high (116.4 mm) mold which holds 1/30 cubic feet of soil, and calls for compaction of three separate lifts of soil using 25 blows by a 5.5 lb hammer falling 12 inches, for a compactive effort of 12,375 ft-lbf/ft^{3}. The "Modified Proctor" test, ASTM D1557 / AASHTO T180, uses same mould, but uses a 10 lb. hammer falling through 18 inches, with 25 blows on each of five lifts, for a compactive effort of about 56,250 ft-lbf/ft^{3}. Both tests allow the use of a larger mould, 6 inches in diameter and holding 1/13.333 ft^{3}, if the soil or aggregate contains too large a proportion of gravel-sized particles to allow repeatability with the 4-inch mould. To provide about the same theoretical compactive effort (12,320 ft-lbf/ft^{3} for standard Proctor and 56,000 ft-lbf/ft^{3} for modified Proctor), the number of blows per lift is increased to 56.

== Alternative compaction testing ==
The California Department of Transportation has developed a similar test, California Test 216, which measures the maximum wet density, and controls the compactive effort based on the length (in fact the height) of the test sample and not on its volume. The primary advantage of this test is that maximum density test results are available sooner, as evaporation of the compacted sample is not necessary.

The European CEN standard for Proctor compaction is EN 13286-2

== See also ==
- Civil engineering
- Earthworks (engineering)
- Geotechnical engineering
- Granular material
- Pareto efficiency
- Soil compaction
- Soil mechanics
