= Bigbelly =

Trash-compacting bin

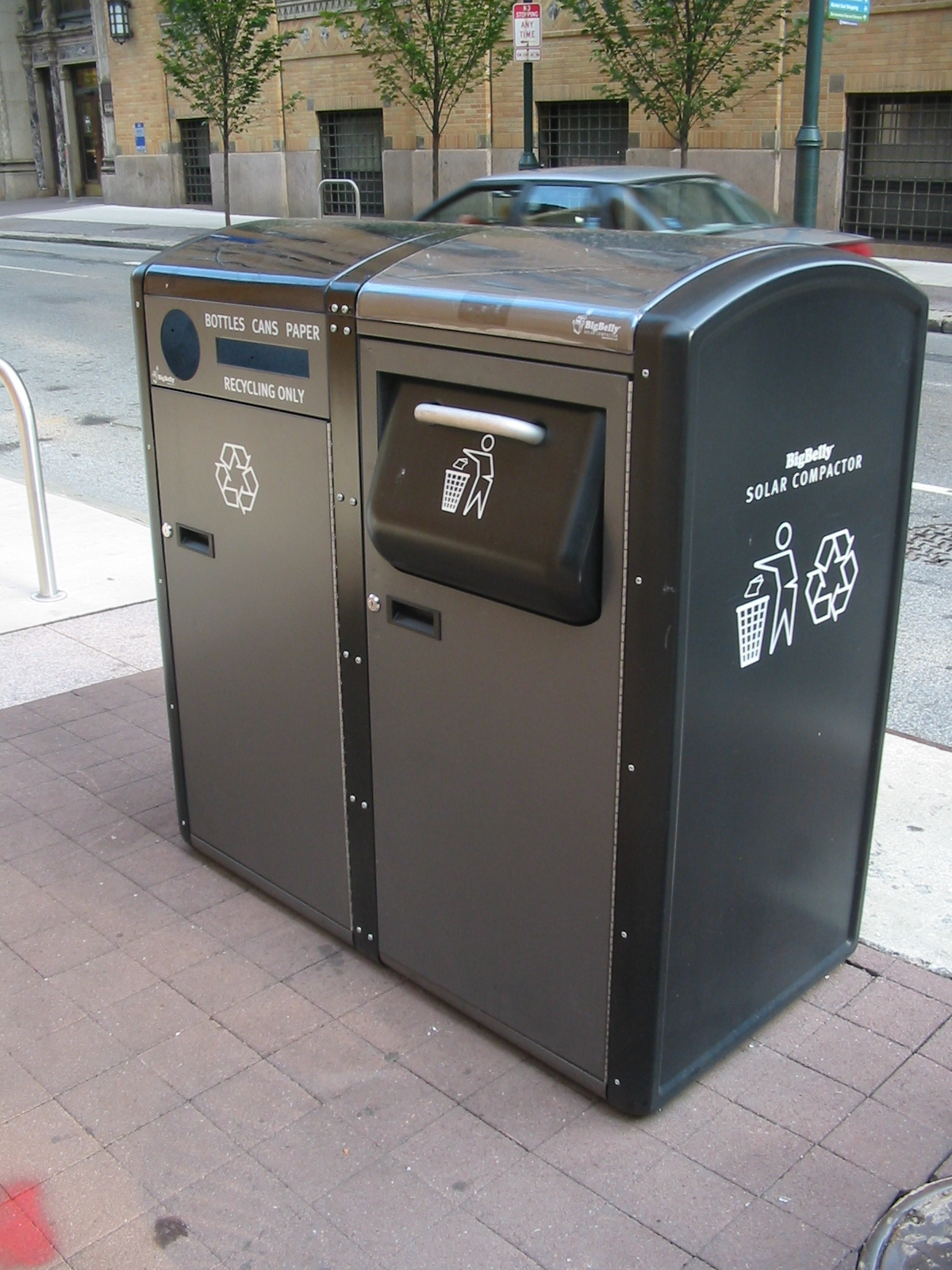
Bigbelly solar trash compactor and recycle bin in Center City, Philadelphia

Bigbelly is a trash-compacting bin, manufactured by U.S. company Bigbelly for use in public spaces.

The bin was designed as a solar powered trash-compacting bin and originally manufactured in Needham, Massachusetts, by Seahorse Power, a company set up in 2003 with the aim of reducing fossil fuel consumption. Due to the bin's commercial success, Seahorse Power changed its name to BigBelly.

Although solar power is still an important feature, the company has since created self-powered stations for use where sun may not be available such as under a convenience store's dispenser canopy and AC powered stations for applications such as corporate cafeterias.

== Design ==
The bin has a capacity of 567 litres. Its compaction mechanism exerts 5.3kN of force, increasing the bin's effective capacity by five. The compaction mechanism is chain-driven, using no hydraulic fluids. Maintenance consists of lubricating the front door lock annually. The mechanism runs on a standard 12 volt battery, which is kept charged by the solar panel. The battery reserve lasts for approximately three weeks. Wireless technology-enabled units report their status into the CLEAN (Collection, Logistics, Efficiency And Notification system) dashboard that gives waste management and administration insights for monitoring and route optimization. Bigbelly also provides companion recycling units that allow cities, parks and universities to collect single-stream or separated recyclable materials in public spaces.

== Usage ==
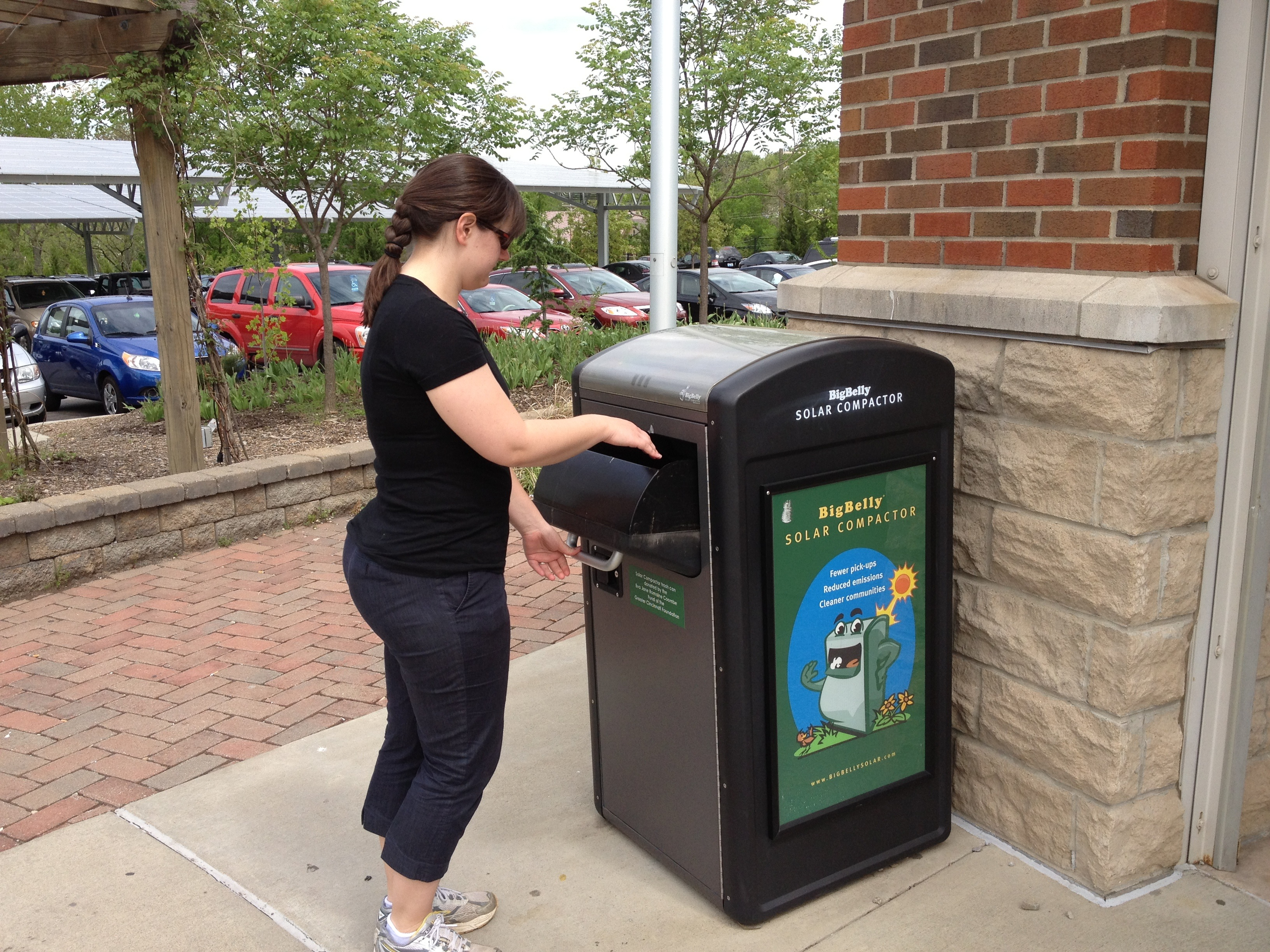
Bigbelly solar trash compactor at Cincinnati Zoo

The first machine was installed in Vail, Colorado, in 2004.

The city of Spokane, Washington, installed 70 of the "smart" garbage bins in 2018.

In July 2023 the city of Münster in Germany began an eight-week test of internet-connected Bigbelly garbage bins.
