= Soil compaction =

Process in geotechnical engineering to increase soil density

In geotechnical engineering, soil compaction is the process in which stress applied to a soil causes densification as air is displaced from the pores between the soil grains. When stress is applied that causes densification due to water (or other liquid) being displaced from between the soil grains, then consolidation, not compaction, has occurred. Normally, compaction is the result of heavy machinery compressing the soil, but it can also occur due to the passage of, for example, animal feet.

In soil science and agronomy, soil compaction is usually a combination of both engineering compaction and consolidation, so may occur due to a lack of water in the soil, the applied stress being internal suction due to water evaporation as well as due to passage of animal feet. Affected soils become less able to absorb rainfall, thus increasing runoff and erosion. Plants have difficulty in compacted soil because the mineral grains are pressed together, leaving little space for air and water, which are essential for root growth. Burrowing animals also find it a hostile environment, because the denser soil is more difficult to penetrate. The ability of a soil to recover from this type of compaction depends on climate, mineralogy and fauna. Soils with high shrink–swell capacity, such as vertisols, recover quickly from compaction where moisture conditions are variable (dry spells shrink the soil, causing it to crack). But clays such as kaolinite, which do not crack as they dry, cannot recover from compaction on their own unless they host ground-dwelling animals such as earthworms—the Cecil soil series is an example.

Before soils can be compacted in the field, some laboratory tests are required to determine their engineering properties. Among various properties, the maximum dry density and the optimum moisture content are vital and specify the required density to be compacted in the field.

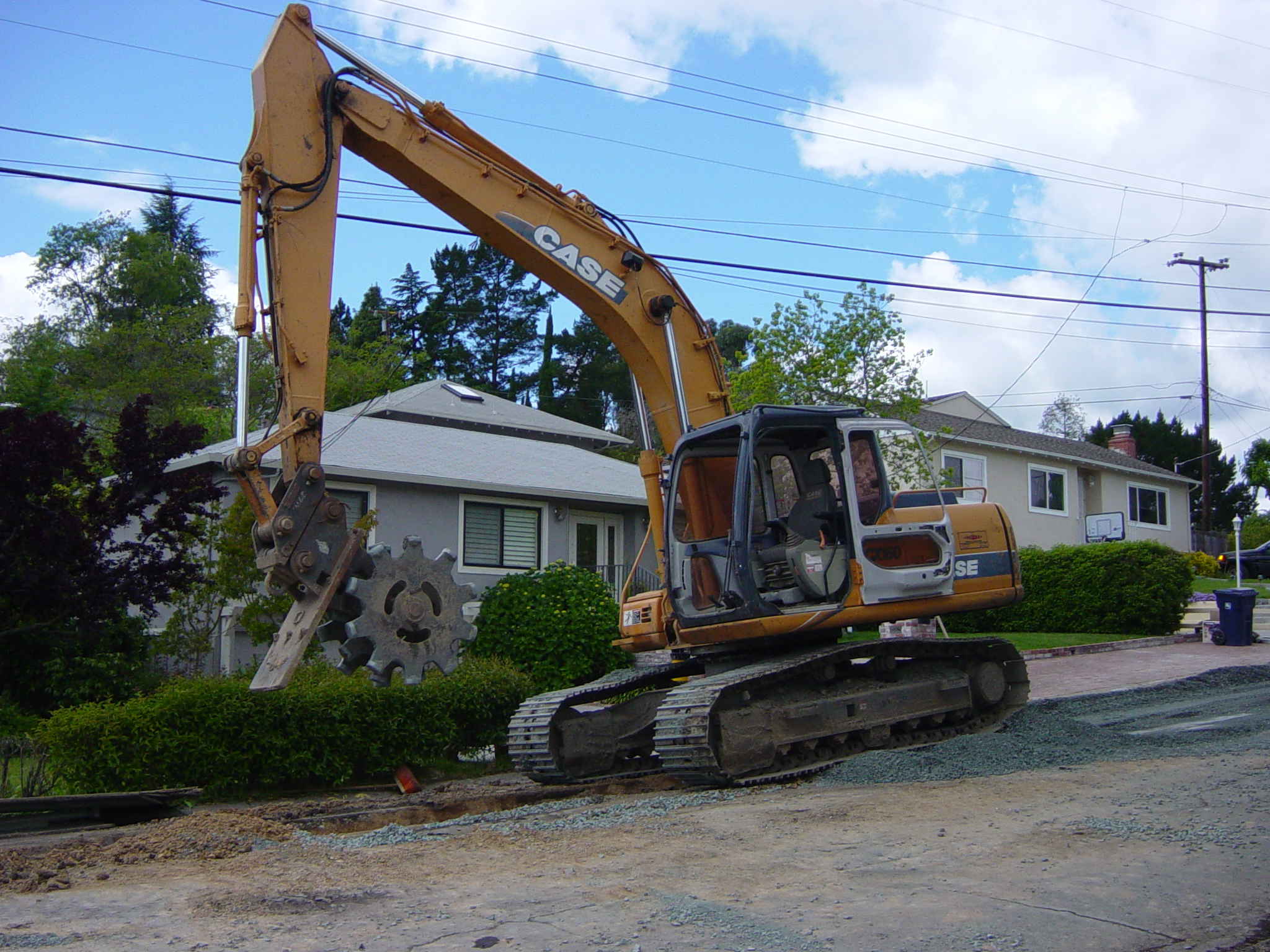
A 10 tonne excavator is here equipped with a narrow sheepsfoot roller to compact the fill over newly placed sewer pipe, forming a stable support for a new road surface.

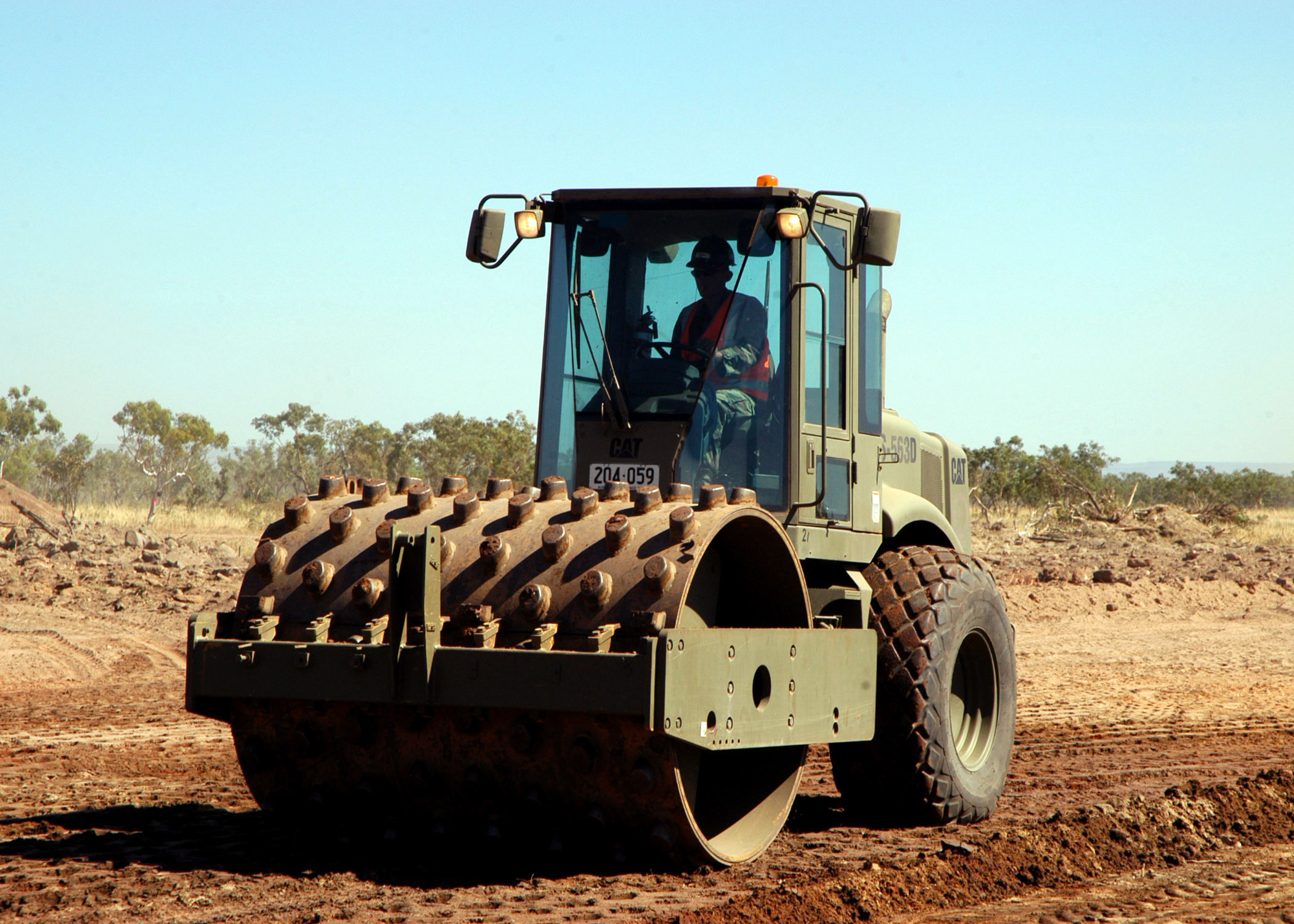
A compactor/roller fitted with a sheepsfoot drum, operated by U.S. Navy Seabees

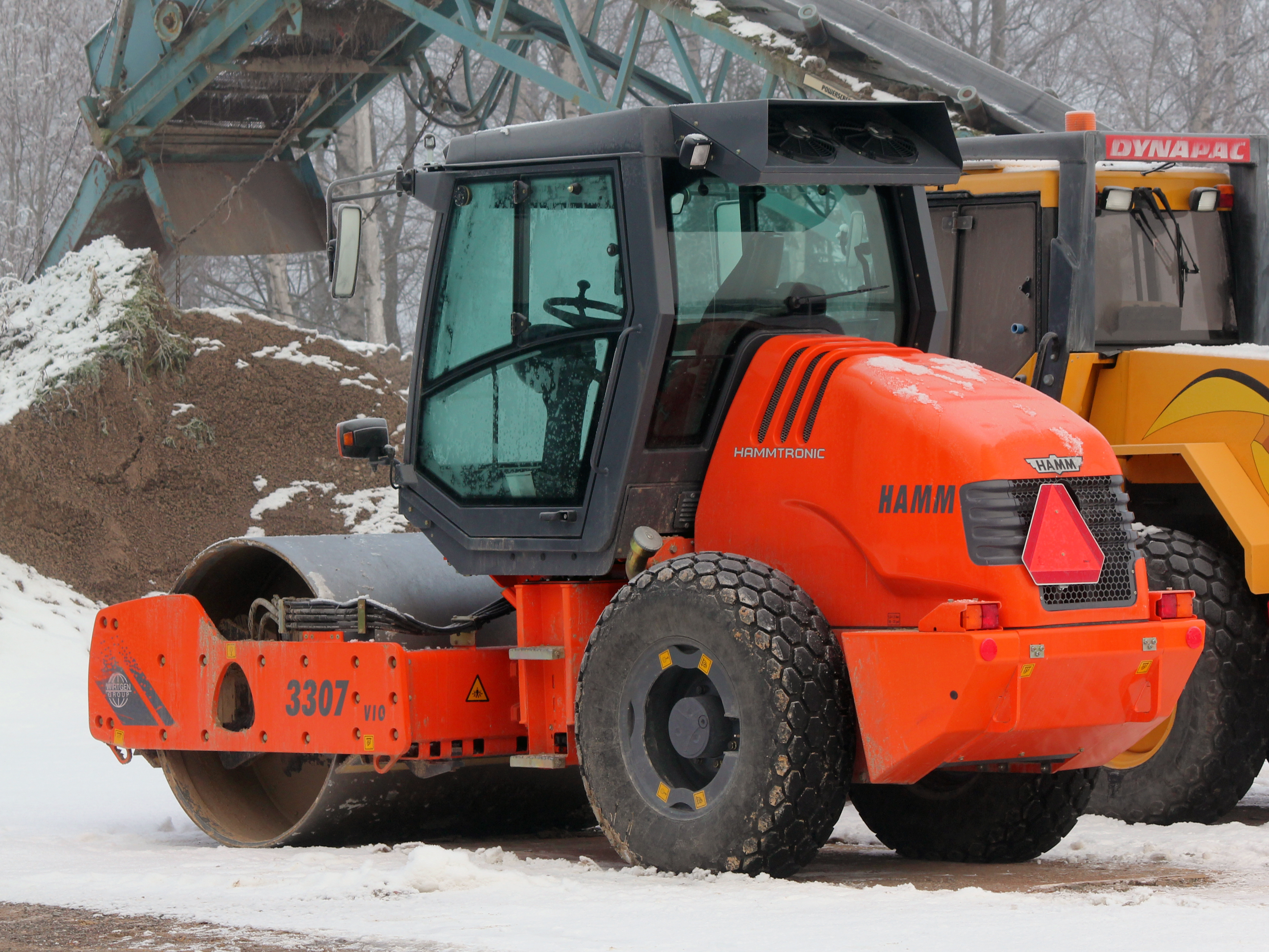
Vibrating roller with plain drum as used for compacting asphalt and granular soils

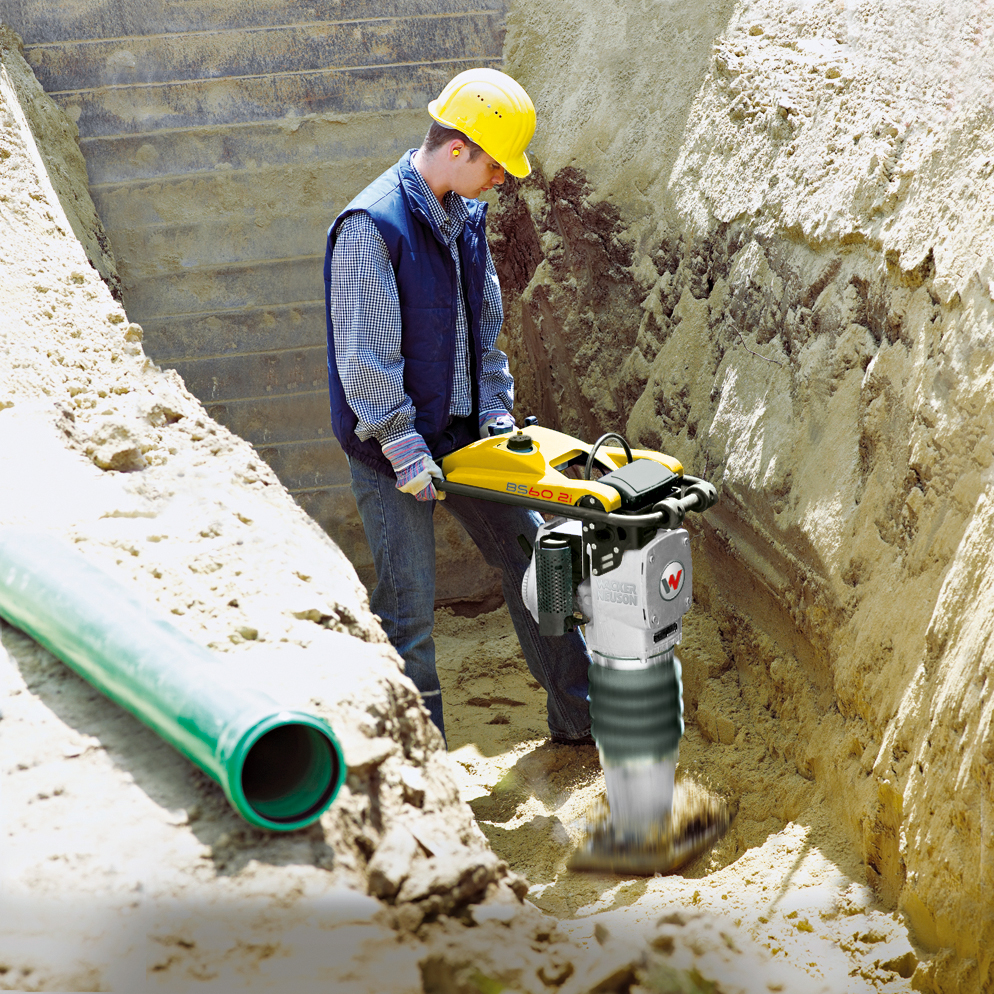
Vibratory rammer in action

== In construction ==
Soil compaction is a vital part of the construction process. It is used for support of structural entities such as building foundations, roadways, walkways, and earth retaining structures to name a few. For a given soil type certain properties may deem it more or less desirable to perform adequately for a particular circumstance. In general, the preselected soil should have adequate strength, be relatively incompressible so that future settlement is not significant, be stable against volume change as water content or other factors vary, be durable and safe against deterioration, and possess proper permeability.

When an area is to be filled or backfilled the soil is placed in layers called lifts. The ability of the first fill layers to be properly compacted will depend on the condition of the natural material being covered. If unsuitable material is left in place and backfilled, it may compress over a long period under the weight of the earth fill, causing settlement cracks in the fill or in any structure supported by the fill. In order to determine if the natural soil will support the first fill layers, an area can be proofrolled. Proofrolling consists of utilizing a piece of heavy construction equipment to roll across the fill site and watching for deflections to be revealed. These areas will be indicated by the development of rutting, pumping, or ground weaving.

To ensure adequate soil compaction is achieved, project specifications will indicate the required soil density or degree of compaction that must be achieved. These specifications are generally recommended by a geotechnical engineer in a geotechnical engineering report.

The soil type—that is, grain-size distributions, shape of the soil grains, specific gravity of soil solids, and amount and type of clay minerals, present—has a great influence on the maximum dry unit weight and optimum moisture content. It also has a great influence on how the materials should be compacted in given situations. Compaction is accomplished by use of heavy equipment. In sands and gravels, the equipment usually vibrates, to cause re-orientation of the soil particles into a denser configuration. In silts and clays, a sheepsfoot roller is frequently used, to create small zones of intense shearing, which drives air out of the soil.

Determination of adequate compaction is done by determining the in-situ density of the soil and comparing it to the maximum density determined by a laboratory test. The most commonly used laboratory test is called the Proctor compaction test and there are two different methods in obtaining the maximum density. They are the standard Proctor and modified Proctor tests; the modified Proctor is more commonly used. For small dams, the standard Proctor may still be the reference.

While soil under structures and pavements needs to be compacted, it is important after construction to decompact areas to be landscaped so that vegetation can grow.

=== Compaction methods ===
There are several means of achieving compaction of a material. Some are more appropriate for soil compaction than others, while some techniques are only suitable for particular soils or soils in particular conditions. Some are more suited to compaction of non-soil materials such as asphalt. Generally, those that can apply significant amounts of shear as well as compressive stress, are most effective.

The available techniques can be classified as:

1. Static – a large stress is slowly applied to the soil and then released.
2. Impact – the stress is applied by dropping a large mass onto the surface of the soil.
3. Vibrating – a stress is applied repeatedly and rapidly via a mechanically driven plate or hammer. Often combined with rolling compaction (see below).
4. Gyrating – a static stress is applied and maintained in one direction while the soil is a subjected to a gyratory motion about the axis of static loading. Limited to laboratory applications.
5. Rolling – a heavy cylinder is rolled over the surface of the soil. Commonly used on sports pitches. Roller-compactors are often fitted with vibratory devices to enhance their effectiveness.
6. Kneading – shear is applied by alternating movement in adjacent positions. An example, combined with rolling compaction, is the 'sheepsfoot' roller used in waste compaction at landfills.

The construction plant available to achieve compaction is extremely varied and is described elsewhere.

=== Test methods in laboratory ===
Soil compactors are used to perform test methods which cover laboratory compaction methods used to determine the relationship between molding water content and dry unit weight of soils. Soil placed as engineering fill is compacted to a dense state to obtain satisfactory engineering properties such as, shear strength, compressibility, or permeability. In addition, foundation soils are often compacted to improve their engineering properties. Laboratory compaction tests provide the basis for determining the percent compaction and molding water content needed to achieve the required engineering properties, and for controlling construction to assure that the required compaction and water contents are achieved. Test methods such as EN 13286-2, EN 13286-47, ASTM D698, ASTM D1557, AASHTO T99, AASHTO T180, AASHTO T193, BS 1377:4 provide soil compaction testing procedures.

Recent research has highlighted the significant influence of compaction conditions on the mechanical behaviour of soils used in engineering applications. Increased compaction has been shown to improve the strength and load-bearing capacity of fine-grained and gypsiferous soils by reducing void ratio and increasing dry density, which enhances particle interlocking and overall soil stability.

These findings emphasize the importance of considering both compaction parameters and environmental exposure in the design and construction of road embankments and subgrades. Proper compaction control and material selection are essential to ensure long-term stability and durability of infrastructure built on problematic soils.

== See also ==
- Soil compaction (agriculture)
- Soil degradation
- Compactor
- Earthwork
- Soil structure
- Aeration
- Shear strength (soil)

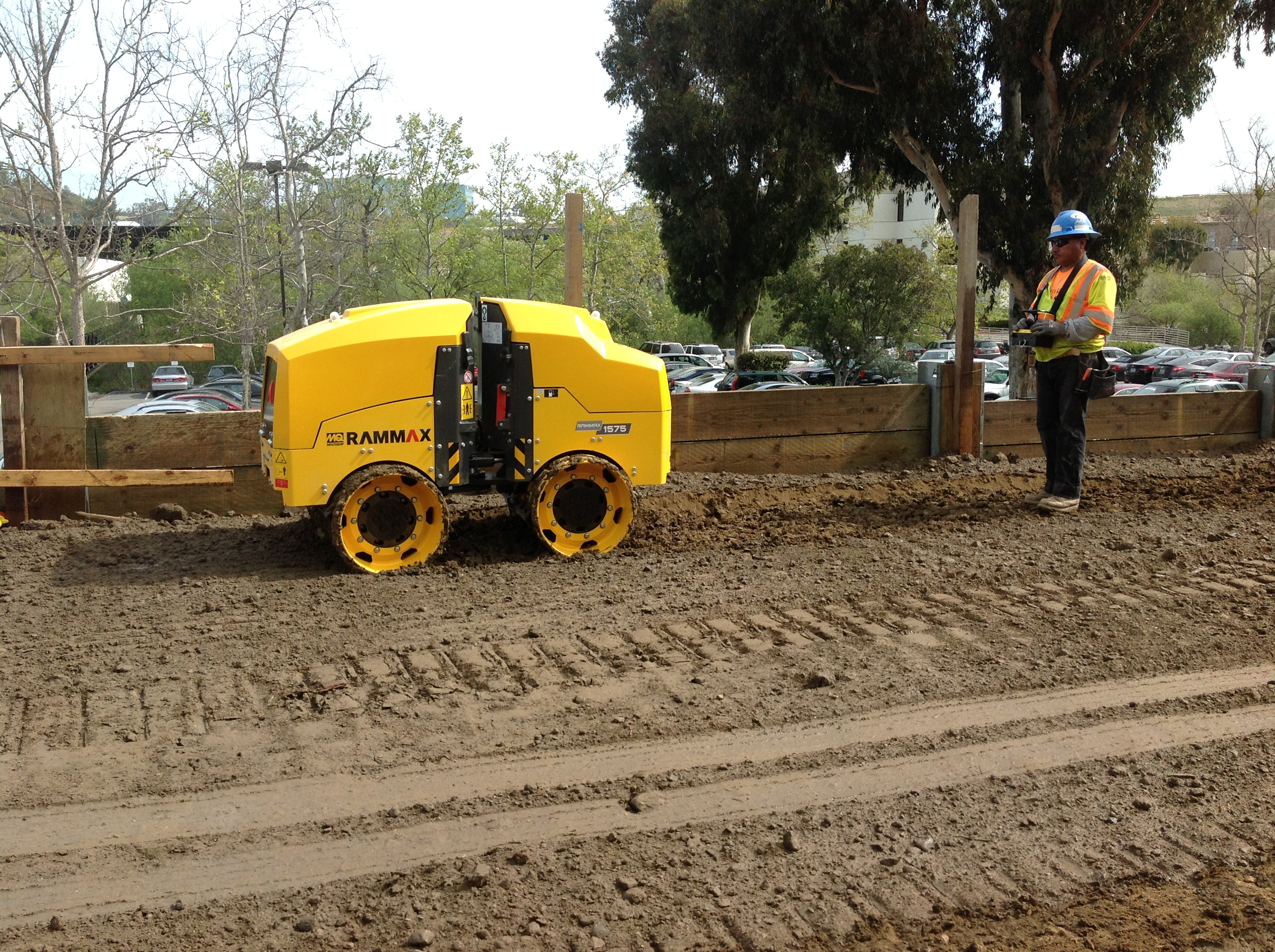
Multiquip RX1575 Rammax Sheepsfoot Trench Compaction Roller on the jobsite in San Diego, California
