= Solar-powered waste compacting bin =

Item of street furniture

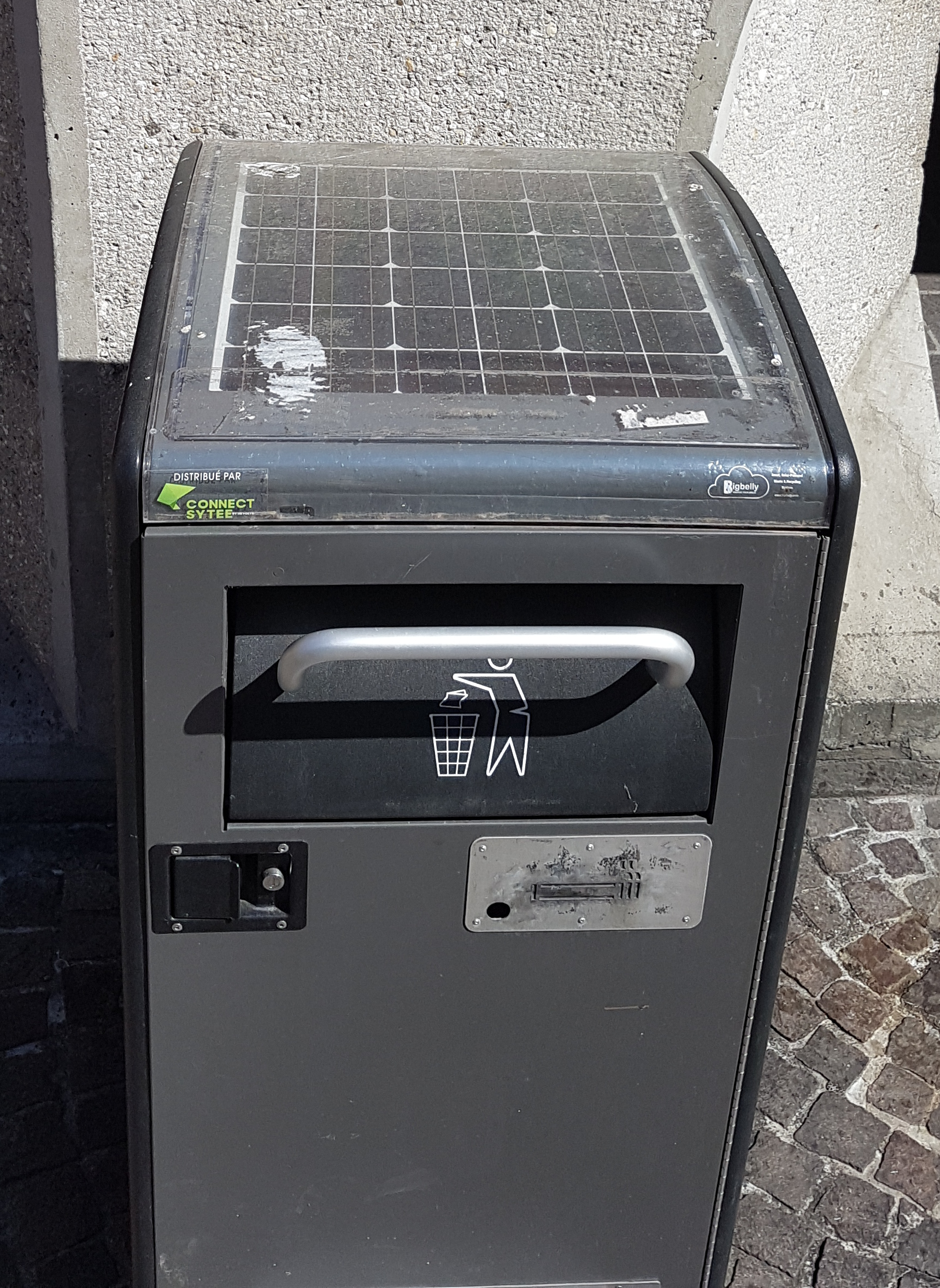
Solar panel on a Bigbelly waste compacting bin

A solar-powered waste compactor is a smart device that reads a waste bin's fill-level in real-time and triggers an automatic compaction of the waste, effectively increasing the bin's capacity by up to 5-8 times. The compaction mechanism runs on a battery, which is charged by the solar panel. Fully charged, the battery reserve lasts for approximately 3–4 weeks, depending on the compaction frequency and usage patterns.

Solar-powered waste compactors are typically connected to a remote software platform through wireless 2G/3G networks. The platform enables waste collection managers to access real-time data analytics and route optimization.

Solar-powered compactors are primarily used in high foot traffic areas such as town centers, shopping malls, amusement parks, beaches, transit stations and sports stadiums.

== Advantages ==
Some of the benefits of using solar-powered waste compactors include:

- Reduced frequency of waste collections
- Cleaner and more hygienic public spaces
- Historical waste collection data analytics
- Reduction in greenhouse gas emissions
- Savings in operational waste collection costs

== See also ==
- PEL BriteBin™
- BigBelly
- Ecube Labs
- CitySolar
