= Ecube Labs =

South Korea based manufacturer

Ecube Labs Co., Ltd.
- Native name: (주)이큐브랩
- Founded: Seoul, South Korea (July 1, 2011)
- Founder: Sun Beom Gwon
- Headquarters: Seoul, South Korea
- Key people: Sun Beom (Sean) Gwon, CEO
- Products: Solar-powered compactor bins, fill-level sensors, remote monitoring platform, fleet management
- Services: Smart Waste Management Services
- Number of employees: 50
- Subsidiaries: Ecube Labs Co. dba Haulla
- Website: ecubelabs.com

Ecube Labs Co., Ltd. is a manufacturer of smart and connected waste bins and solar-powered portable waste compactors, reflecting the broader, global trend of Internet of Things. Ecube Lab's waste containers are equipped with sensors capable of monitoring their fill-level and status.

Ecube Labs was established in 2011 and is headquartered in Seoul, South Korea at Guro Digital Industrial Complex, an industrial complex that has become a hub for high-tech companies and start-ups.

The company's smart waste management solution is currently being used in over 100 cities worldwide. Some of the largest product installations are located in Seoul, Melbourne, Baltimore, Dublin, Ibague, and Ghent.

== Products ==
- CleanCUBE: A smart solar-powered waste compacting bin. Embedded sensors measure the bin fill-level in real-time and trigger automated compaction of waste, effectively increasing the bin capacity by 500% - 700%. Using 4G wireless telecommunication technology, real-time data from CleanCUBEs is sent to Ecube Labs' online platform (CleanCityNetworks), allowing remote monitoring of bin status and fill-levels. The CleanCUBE boasts optional features such as LED back-lit advertisement panels.
- CleanFLEX: A wireless sensor that measures a container's fill-level in real time. The device is battery powered and can be attached to any type of container to monitor any type of waste. Using 4G wireless telecommunication technology, CleanFLEX sends real-time data to CleanCityNetworks platform.
- CleanCityNetworks (CCN): An integrated waste management platform designed to optimize the efficiency of waste collection. CCN provides a comprehensive collection of historical data and analytics reports. It also allows users to monitor CleanCUBEs and CleanFLEX-equipped containers in real-time. In addition to CCN notifying users when and where collection is required in real-time, its predictive algorithms generate schedules for future collections. CCN also helps drivers by optimizing routes for each collection.
- CCNx: An FM solution which leverages the data of client's waste management operations and turns manually scheduled routes into fully optimized routes using machine learning algorithms.

== Haulla ==
- History

Haulla’s waste brokerage service started in 2020 and offers managed smart waste services to commercial clients across the US. Starting in California, Haulla has recently expanded its service area to encompass over 30 states. Haulla connects local businesses with local haulers and is known for providing a new dumpster at the beginning of service while reducing collection costs by 15-30%.

Haulla’s customer base falls within the commercial sector and includes but is not limited to retail, auto shops, restaurants/bars/good and beverage, faith based institutions, convenience stores, grocery stores, liquor stores, gas stations, commercial buildings, plazas, schools, and industrial plants.
