= Waste compaction =

Process of reducing waste size

Waste compaction is the process of compacting waste, reducing it in size. Garbage compactors and waste collection vehicles compress waste so that more of it can be stored in the same space. Waste is compacted again, more thoroughly, at the landfill to conserve valuable airspace and to extend the landfill's life span.

== Consumer and post-collection compaction ==
Pre-landfill waste compaction is often beneficial, both for people disposing of waste and the company collecting it. This is because waste collection companies frequently charge by volume or require use of standard-volume containers, and compaction allows more waste to fit in the same space. Trash compactors are available for both residential and commercial use. Compacting garbage after it is collected allows more waste to fit inside the collection vehicle, meaning fewer trips to a dump or transfer station are required. The collection company also incurs lower landfill fees, if the landfill charges by volume.

== Landfill compaction ==
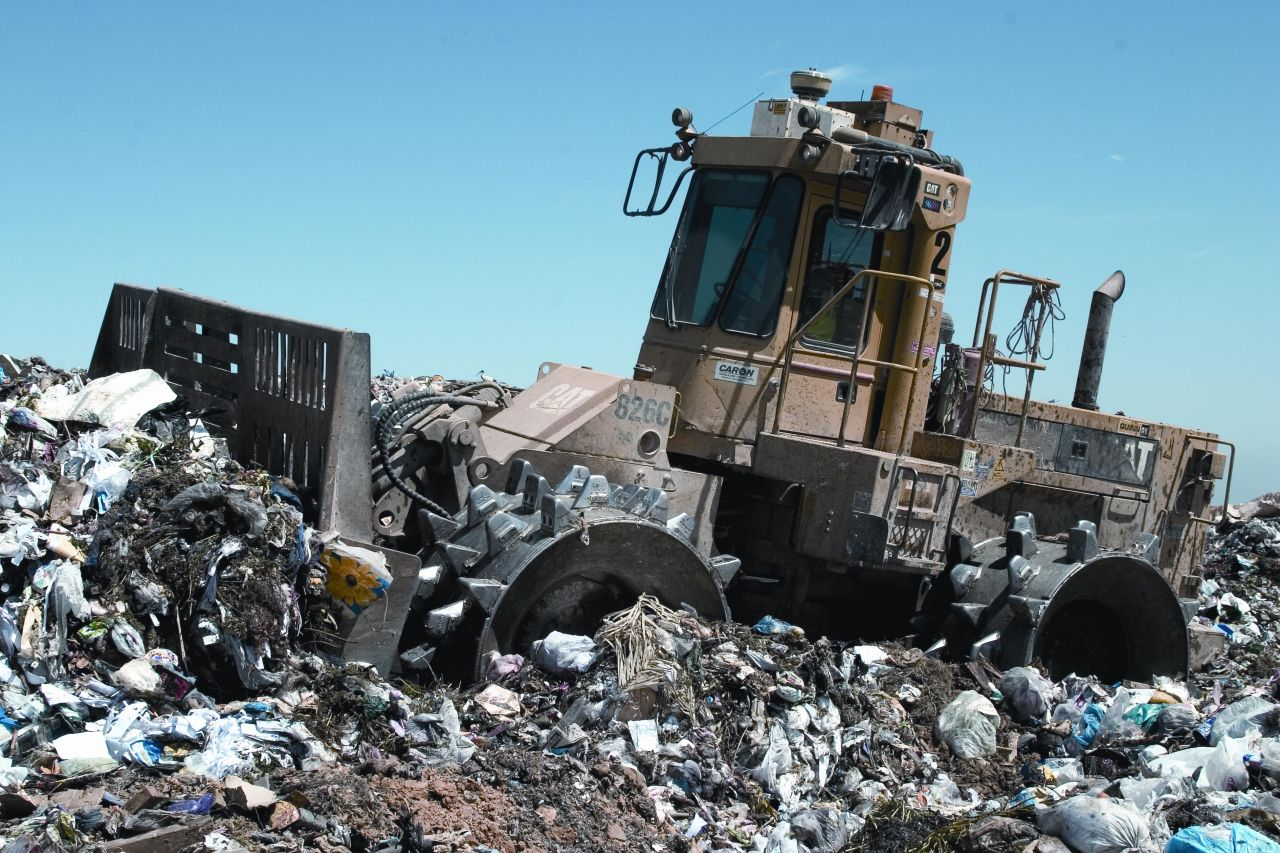
Landfill compactor

A landfill compaction vehicle has two main functions: to spread the waste evenly in layers over the landfill, and to compact waste to reduce its volume and help stabilize the landfill. Proper waste compacting includes the process of using a steel wheeled/drum landfill compactor to shred, tear and press together various items in the waste stream so they consume a minimal volume of landfill airspace. The higher the compaction rate, the more trash the landfill can receive and store. This will also reduce landslides, cave-ins and minimize the risk of explosions of landfill gas (see landfill gas migration).

Main compaction is produced by the landfill compactors steel tooth on the wheel drums. Special teeth can penetrate the waste and deliver a focused compression point, providing compaction and increased density. Ground pressure of the tooth can exceed over 4,000 pounds per square inch (28,000 kPa) (PSI). The design of the machine and more importantly the wheels and the teeth is very critical in compaction. Power transmission from engine to the wheel drums is another key factor in compactors, depending on the application and size of the landfill the correct machine size and configuration should be selected.

== Advantages and disadvantages ==
Loose, non-compacted trash occupies up to 20 times more dumpster space than compacted waste. Waste haulage costs are reduced by fewer or smaller dumpsters, and dumpster pickup frequency can be reduced by 50 percent. A side effect of waste compaction is that important items, like evidence in a crime, may be difficult to recover from the garbage. Due to reduced oxygenation, biodegradation of organic waste is also slowed.

== See also ==
- Soil compaction
- Surface runoff
