= Shredding (disassembling genomic data) =

Shredding refers to the process in bioinformatics of taking assembled gene sequences and disassembling them into short sequences of usually 500 to 750 base pairs (bp). This is generally done for the purpose of taking the short shredded sequences and reapplying various analysis and bioinformatic techniques. Being able to cut DNA samples and then run them through gel electrophoresis to study each strand in order to help find cures for diseases or illnesses is also another purpose.

The most common tool or enzyme used to shred DNA into fragments is CAS9. Clustered regularly interspaces short palindromic repeats(CRISPR) - Cas9 allows genetic material to be either altered, removed or added at specific locations. CRISPR-Cas 9 consists of guide RNA (gRNA) and the enzyme(Cas9). This enzyme is able to cut DNA the exactly as wanted without making a mistake. There are also many other enzymes that help with shredding such as CASX or CAS3. CAS3 is a shredding tool but is not as accurate as CAS9 and may lead to random DNA strands being deleted.

== History ==
DNA (deoxyribonucleic acid) was first found by Rosalind Franklin. She discovered that DNA exists in species by taking multiple x-rays until she found an "X" looking diagram. She did not actually know much about it other than it exists. She died a few years later due to a massive amount of exposure to x-rays. James Watson and Francis Crick then used Rosalind's discovery and looked further into it. They discovered the structure of DNA. They were the first to know that DNA has a double helix after the analysis of the x-rays.

With time, DNA fragments were discovered. They first studied DNA on very simplistic organisms. This is because the human DNA strand is very complex compared to an organism like a fruit fly, which has much simpler genes. The scientists did various experiments using simplistic genes and worked their way into much harder genes. They did various cutting to specific genes to see what would occur.

The structure of DNA years after its discovery by Rosalind Franklin.

== Human Genome Project ==
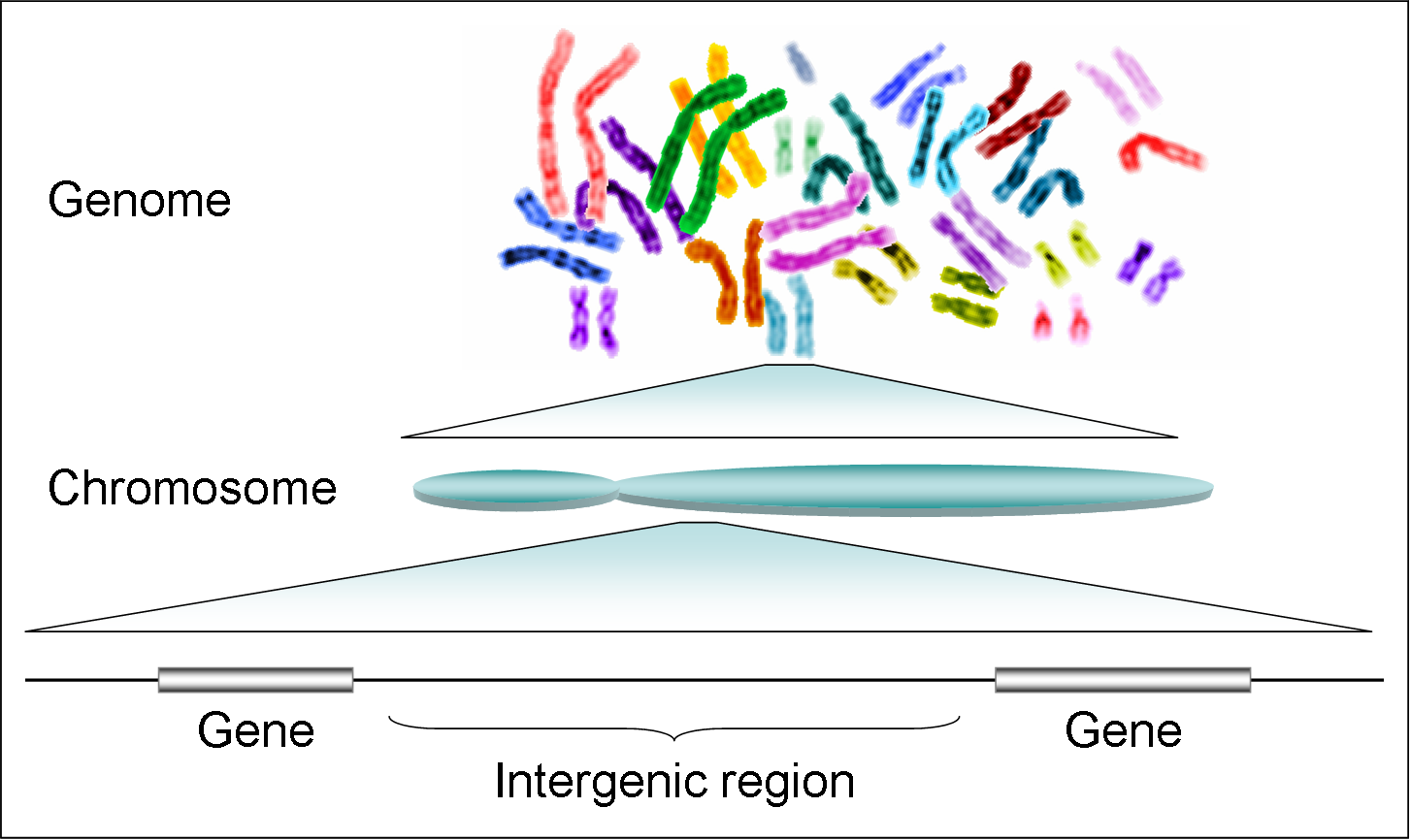
Genomes to chromosomes and from chromosomes to genes

The process of shredding was used successfully several times during the analysis phase of the Human Genome Project. The first phase of the Human Genome Project is called the "shotgun phase". During this phase human chromosomes are 1). Divided into DNA segments of equal size and then 2). Subdivided into even smaller DNA segments. The overall goal is to get DNA segments into small sizes in order to be able to test run them.
