= Stracciatella =

Stracciatella may refer to:

- Stracciatella (cheese), a soft cheese from the Apulia region
- Stracciatella (ice cream), a gelato variety with fine strands of drizzled chocolate stirred through it, inspired by the egg in the soup with the same name
- Stracciatella (soup), an egg drop soup popular in central Italy
